= Moniruzzaman =

Moniruzzaman or Maniruzzaman or Muniruzzaman (Bengali: মনীরুজ্জামান) is a Bengali masculine given name of Arabic origin. It may refer to:

- Maniruzzaman Islamabadi (1875–1950), Islamic philosopher, nationalist activist and journalist from Chittagong
- ANM Muniruzzaman (1924–1971), professor of statistics, University of Dhaka, killed in the 1971 Dhaka University massacre
- Mohammad Moniruzzaman Miah (1935–2016), 20th vice-chancellor of the University of Dhaka
- Mohammad Moniruzzaman (1936–2008), writer, freedom fighter, lyricist, professor at University of Dhaka
- Talukder Moniruzzaman (1938–2019), National Professor and political scientist
- Mohammad Moniruzzaman Adiabadi (1940–2024), linguist
- A. H. Mohammad Moniruzzaman (born 1950), diplomat
- S. M. Maniruzzaman (judge) (born 1972), High Court justice
- Al Mohammad Moniruzzaman (born 1976), cricketer from Mymensingh
- Munir Uz Zaman (born 1978), photographer
- Moniruzzaman Monir (born 1990), cricketer from Chittagong
- Saleh Mohammad Moniruzzaman, navy admiral
- Md. Moniruzzaman Moni, former Mayor of Khulna
- Abdullah Nurul Muhammad Muniruzzaman, major general and president of the Bangladesh Institute of Peace & Security Studies
- Md. Moniruzzaman, Bangladeshi police officer

== See also ==
- Monir (disambiguation)
- Zaman (disambiguation)
