= Gangachara Adarsha High School =

Non-government school from Rangpur, Bangladesh

- গংগাচড়া আদর্শ উচ্চ বিদ্যলয়

Location
- Gangachara, Rangpur; 25.8523783°N 89.2201316°E

Information
- School type: Non-Govt. Secondary School
- Established: November 17, 1991
- Educational authority: Board of Intermediate and Secondary Education, Dinajpur
- Session: January–November
- Principal: Md. Enamul Haque
- Staff: 4
- Teaching staff: 20
- Enrolment: 930
- Capacity: 1000
- Classes: 6th–10th Grades
- Language: Bengali
- EIIN: 127258

Gangachara Adarsha High School (Bengali: গংগাচড়া আদর্শ উচ্চ বিদ্যালয়, lit. 'Gangachara Ideal High School') is a secondary high school at Gangachara Upazila in Rangpur District, Bangladesh. This is the first ranked high school in the entire upazila (sub-district).

== History ==
The school was established in 1991 based in in-front of Gangachara Upazila field surrounded by office building of the Upazila. Despite having low literacy rate, the population from this region seems to have much interest in education. But there weren't many educational institutions in that union council before 1991. Some local people and social workers first founded a primary school named Gangachara Shishu Niketon in 1989. In continuation of this, they built another secondary school in November 1991 named Gangachara Adarsha High School which was first made with only bamboo sticks and tin sheets. Today it have a three-storey building containing 19 rooms, with 16 reserved for classes, one dedicated for library and computer lab, one for the head teacher and one for other office staffs. The respected ones are late Abul Kasem Advokate, Kazi Md. Sharifuzzaman who was a head teacher of the school, Md. Tahid Uddin, Md. Abdul Jabbar, Md. Mojammal Haque Mosharof, Dr. S M Khorshed Alam Shaja, Dr. Abdul Hakim, Md. Ashraful Islam, Md. Rafikul Islam, Md. Rejaul Karim Suruj, Md. Abu Taieb who served as a teacher, Md. Mostofa Kamal, Md. Mofajjal Hossen, Md. Mostafizar Rahman who was the President of the school committee, Md. Ajhar Ali, Md. Noor Amin, Md. Sharif Uddin, Md. Majibor Rahman, Md. Eiub ALi, Saju Ahmed Lal and Md. Shafikul Islam Khaja. As a joint-school, the then head teacher of Gangachara Shishu Niketon intensively served as the first head teacher of the secondary school too.

Respected former head teacher, late Habibur Rahman Sir used his real life experience and strategy to make the school real ideal in society. Though being established in 1991, It started its first Public exam in 1996. Since then 29–30 batch have passed with credits.

== Teaching staff ==
The head teacher of primary joint-school Gangachara Shishu Niketon, Asaduzzaman Bablu served as the first head teacher of the secondary school. Retired Kazi Md. Sharifuzzaman was the last but late Habibur Rahman Sir was the most successful head teacher of the school. The current head teacher is Md. Enamul Hauqe with almost 24 co-teachers and other staff.

== Red Crescent ==
The school Red Crescent Unit helps people affected by floods and other natural calamities. They organize basic first aid workshops for the students of schools.

== Other activities and achievements ==
The school have been participating in all kinds of co-curricular activities, like sports, debate, scouting and others. In 2000, It received national credit for best Girl Guides. SEQAEP marked it for the best educational institution in the upazila respectively three times in 2011, 2012 and 2013 based on results. In 2016, it received credits in district level for best results. The school committee arranged a reunion ceremony for all the ex-students in 2017 during its completion of 25 years.
