= Muhammed Firdaus Mian =

Officer in Bangladesh Army

Muhammed Firdaus Mian is a retired major general of the Bangladesh Army and former chairman of the Bangladesh Institute of International and Strategic Studies.

== Career ==
Mian served as a defence attache at the Embassy of Bangladesh to the United States from 2003 to 2005. He was the Area Commander and General Officer Commanding of 11th Infantry Division of the Bangladesh Army.

Mian was appointed chairman of the Bangladesh Institute of International and Strategic Studies on 6 July 2009, replacing Munshi Faiz Ahmad. He served as the chairman till 12 March 2009 and was replaced by Mufleh R. Osmany.
