= A. N. M. Muniruzzaman =

A. N. M. Muniruzzaman may refer to:

- A. N. M. Muniruzzaman (statistician) (1924–1971), Bangladeshi statistician
- A. N. M. Muniruzzaman (general) (fl. 1969–2006), Bangladeshi general
