= A. S. M. Ridwanur Rahman =

Bangladeshi general

A S M Ridwanur Rahman
- Education: Bangladesh Military Academy
- Military career
- Allegiance: Bangladesh
- Branch: Bangladesh Army
- Service years: 1990 – 2026
- Rank: Major General
- Unit: Regiment of Artillery
- Commands: Director General of Bangladesh Institute of International and Strategic Studies; GOC of 17th Infantry Division; Director General of National Telecommunication Monitoring Centre; Commandant of Bangladesh Institute of Peace Support Operation Training; Commander of 9th Artillery Brigade; Commander of 17th Artillery Brigade
- Conflicts: UNOMIG

A. S. M. Ridwanur Rahman, awc, afwc, psc, G is a retired two-star general of the Bangladesh Army and served as director general of the Bangladesh Institute of International and Strategic Studies (BIISS). He previously served as the GOC of the 17th Infantry Division. Prior to that, he was director general of the National Telecommunication Monitoring Centre. He has served as the commandant of the Bangladesh Institute of Peace Support Operation Training (BIPSOT). Before serving at BIPSOT, he was the president of the Bangladesh Army Sports Control Board.

== Career ==
Ridwan was commissioned in the Bangladesh Army on 21 December 1990 with the 23rd BMA Long Course. He has served as director of the Directorate of Military Training at Army headquarters as brigadier general. He was a member of the National Olympic Academy Committee. Under his command BIPSOT arranged "Exercise Tiger Lightning 2022" in partnership with the Bangladesh Armed Forces and the Oregon National Guard. He was promoted to the rank of major general on 20 December 2021.
