= BIPSS =

BIPSS may refer to:

- Bangladesh Institute of Peace and Security Studies, a think tank on Southeast Asian issues
- Bilateral inferior petrosal sinus sampling, a procedure to help distinguish types of Cushing's disease
