= Sanjoy Kumar Adhikary =

Dr. Sanjoy Kumar Adhikary
- Occupation: Academic
- Known for: Higher education administration and quality assurance
- Title: Professor

Academic background
- Education: Bangladesh Agricultural University; Bangabandhu Sheikh Mujibur Rahman Agricultural University

Academic work
- Discipline: Plant Pathology
- Institutions: Khulna University; University Grants Commission of Bangladesh; Noakhali Science and Technology University

Dr Sanjoy Kumar Adhikary is a Bangladeshi academic and professor of Agrotechnology at Khulna University. He served as the Vice-Chancellor of Noakhali Science and Technology University from May 2008 to September 2010. He has also held roles in higher education quality assurance under the University Grants Commission of Bangladesh.

== Early life and education ==
Adhikary completed his Secondary School Certificate in 1973 from Rupapat Baman Chandra High School and his Higher Secondary Certificate in 1975 from Government Rajendra College. He completed his Bachelor of Science in agriculture in 1979 and his Master of Science in Plant Pathology in 1982 from Bangladesh Agricultural University.

In 2000, Adhikary completed his Doctor of Philosophy (PhD) in Plant Pathology from Bangabandhu Sheikh Mujibur Rahman Agricultural University. His doctoral research focused on variability among isolates of Bipolaris sorokiniana, a pathogen that causes leaf blotch in wheat.

== Career ==
Adhikary began his academic career as a lecturer at Patuakhali Agricultural College in 1981, where he later served as an assistant professor until 1994. He subsequently joined Hajee Mohammad Danesh Agricultural College where he was promoted to associate professor. In October 2001, he joined Khulna University as a professor in the Agrotechnology Discipline. He was appointed Vice-Chancellor of Noakhali Science and Technology University in May 2008 and served until September 2010.

After completing his tenure as vice-chancellor, Adhikary returned to Khulna University and later became involved in higher-education quality-assurance initiatives. He participated in the Higher Education Quality Enhancement Project (HEQEP) under the University Grants Commission of Bangladesh and joined as a Quality Assurance Specialist in 2014. In April 2017, he was appointed Head of the Quality Assurance Unit under HEQEP.

Adhikary has also served on the Bangladesh Accreditation Council since June 2019.
