= Engineer-in-Chief =

- Engineer-in-Chief (Bangladesh army)
- Engineer-in-Chief (Pakistan Army)

== See also ==
- Chief Royal Engineer
