= Iftekhar Anis =

Bangladeshi military personnel

Mohammad Iftekhar Anis
- Iftekhar Anis, 2022
- Education: Bangladesh Military Academy
- Military career
- Allegiance: Bangladesh
- Branch: Bangladesh Army
- Service years: 1990 – 2025
- Rank: Major General
- Unit: Corps of Engineers
- Commands: Director General of Bangladesh Institute of International and Strategic Studies; Engineer-in-chief at Army Headquarters; Chairman of Sena Kalyan Sangstha; Deputy Military Secretary of Army Headquarters; Commander of 24th Engineers Construction Brigade; Station Commander, Qadirabad
- Awards: Bishishto Seba Padak (BSP)

Iftekhar Anis BSP, awc, afwc, psc is a retired two-star officer of the Bangladesh Army and former director general of the Bangladesh Institute of International and Strategic Studies. Earlier, he served as the engineer-in-chief at army headquarters. He was the project director of the Padma Bridge Link Road.

Anis was the chairman of Sena Kalyan Sangstha. Prior to joining the SKS, he was director of works and chief engineer (army) at the Quarter Master General's Branch, army headquarters.

== Career ==
Anis was commissioned on 21 December 1990 from the Bangladesh Military Academy with the 23rd long course in the Corps of Engineers. Anis was commander of the 24 Engineering Construction Brigade.

Anis was a platoon commander of Operation Kuwait Punorgothon.

Anis served as project director of the 55-kilometre Dhaka-Bhanga highway known as the Padma Bridge Link Road while he was a colonel. He was deputy assistant military secretary in the Military Secretary's Branch, Army Headquarters. In September 2023, Anis became E-in-C, engineer-in-chief of the Bangladesh Army. He was a director of the Bangladesh Army International University of Science and Technology.

Anis was the chairman of Jolshiri Abashon. He was the president of the Jolshiri Golf Club.

Anis later served as the chairman of Sena Kalyan Sangstha. He was appointed the director general of the Bangladesh Institute of International and Strategic Studies. In January 2024, he was appointed director of Biman Bangladesh Airlines.
