= Abdul Qayoom Mollah =

Bangladesh Army officer

Abdul Quayyum Mollah
- Education: Bangladesh Military Academy
- Military career
- Allegiance: Bangladesh
- Branch: Bangladesh Army
- Service years: 1990–2025
- Rank: Major General
- Unit: Bangladesh Infantry Regiment
- Commands: Director General of National Telecommunication Monitoring Centre; GOC of 7th Infantry Division; Commandant of Bangladesh Institute of Peace Support Operations Training; Commander of 360th Infantry Brigade; Station Commander, Sylhet; Commander of 16th Infantry Brigade
- Conflicts: UNOMIG

Abdul Quayyum Mollah (Note: rcds, ndc, psc) is a retired two-star officer of the Bangladesh Army and former director general of the National Telecommunication Monitoring Centre (NTMC). Before that, he was the general officer commanding (GOC) of the 7th infantry Division and area commander of Barishal. Earlier in his career, he also served as the commandant of the Bangladesh Institute of Peace Support Operations Training (BIPSOT).

== Career ==
Brigadier General Mollah commanded the 360 Infantry Brigade based in Jalalabad Cantonment in 2016. From 16 December 2015 to 7 September 2016, he served as the station commander of Jalalabad Cantonment.

In December 2020, Mollah was appointed the controller of examinations of the Secondary and Higher Education Department of the Bangladesh University of Professionals.

Mollah hosted General Manoj Mukund Naravane, Chief of Staff of the Indian Army, during his visit to the Bangladesh Institute of Peace Support Operations Training in April 2021.

On 24 November 2021, Mollah attended a defence conference of the Bangladesh High Commission in the United Kingdom.
