= National Telecommunication Monitoring Centre =

Bangladeshi telecom intelligence agency

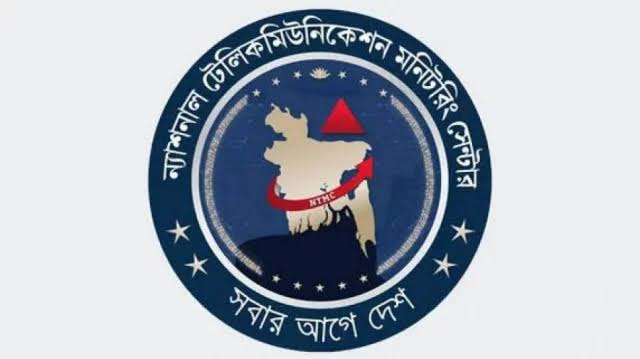

Agency overview
- Formed: 2008–present
- Motto: Country First - সবার আগে দেশ
- Agency executive: Major General Osman Sarwar, Director General
- Parent department: Ministry of Home Affairs
- Website: ntmc.gov.bd

The National Telecommunication Monitoring Centre is a national-level intelligence agency of Bangladesh responsible for monitoring, collecting, and recording information and communication data. It is also responsible for the interception of electronic communication such as phone calls, emails, and social media accounts.

== History ==
The National Monitoring Centre was established in 2008 under the Directorate General of Forces Intelligence. On 31 January 2013, the National Monitoring Centre was reorganized as an independent agency named National Telecommunication Monitoring Centre, and Brigadier General Ibne Fazal Sayekhuzzaman was appointed its founding director. The centre moved from its office from headquarters of the Directorate General of Forces Intelligence in Dhaka Cantonment to its own purpose built headquarters on 1 January 2017. Its technology was updated on 6 April 2017. Brigadier General Ziaul Ahsan was made the director of the centre on 6 March 2017. The government approved the purchase of 2.36 billion taka worth of equipment for the centre to increase its monitoring ability. On 21 July 2022, a new post was created as director general (DG) and existing Director Ziaul Ahsan promoted to major general, and he became the first DG of NTMC.

== Head of NTMC ==
Director

Name	Time Period	Comments
Brigadier General Ibne Fazal Sayekhuzzaman	31 January 2013 - 5 March 2017	Founding Director
Brigadier General Ziaul Ahsan	6 March 2017 - 20 July 2022	Last Director at NTMC, after that this post was upgraded to Director General as a Grade-1 post.

Director General

Name	Time Period	Comments
Major General Ziaul Ahsan	21 July 2022 - 6 August 2024	On 21 July 2022, got promoted to Major General and became the first Director General
Major General Ridwanur Rahman	6 August 2024 - 14 October 2024	
Major General Abdul Qayoom Mollah	15 October 2024 - 9 Nov 2025	
Major General Mohammad Osman Sarwar	10 Nov 2025 - Present	
