= Noakhali Science and Technology University =

Public university in Bangladesh

- নোয়াখালী বিজ্ঞান ও প্রযুক্তি বিশ্ববিদ্যালয়
- Other name: NSTU
- Type: Public
- Established: 2006; 20 years ago
- Accreditation: Institution of Engineers, Bangladesh (IEB)
- Affiliations: University Grants Commission (UGC)
- Chancellor: President Mirza Fakhrul Islam Alamgir
- Vice-Chancellor: Mohammad Ismail
- Academic staff: 403
- Students: 6,437
- Undergraduates: 5,327
- Postgraduates: 2,000
- Location: Noakhali, 3814, Bangladesh; 22°47′31″N 91°06′07″E
- Campus: Urban, 101 acres (41 ha)
- Language: English
- Colours: Blue and White
- Website: nstu.edu.bd nstu.ac.bd

University rankings

Global – Overall
- THE World: 1201-1500 (2026)

Regional – Overall
- QS Asia: 851-900 (2026)

Noakhali Science and Technology University (Bengali: নোয়াখালী বিজ্ঞান ও প্রযুক্তি বিশ্ববিদ্যালয়) (known as NSTU) is a public university in the coastal terrain Noakhali of Bangladesh. It is the 27th public university and fifth science and technology university in Bangladesh. Its foundation stone was laid on 11 October 2003 and academic activities started on 22 June 2006.

== History ==
Former Prime Minister Begum Khaleda Zia laid the foundation stone of NSTU on 11 October 2003. Earlier, Prime Minister Sheikh Hasina took necessary steps to establish this university. At 15 July 2001, her government passed a law in the parliament. Its construction work was formally inaugurated on 24 March 2005. Finally, it started its academic activities on 22 June 2006. It is the fifth of 12 such universities the government decided in 1997 to establish in the 12 erstwhile greater districts where there was no university.

== Campus ==
NSTU's campus is located in Sonapur, 8 kilometers southwest of Maijdee, over 101 acres (0.41 km^{2}) covering 93 Salla and 95 Noakhali Mouza. The goal of the university is to be one of the top tier universities in Bangladesh. Presently the campus consists of one 5-storey administrative building, two academic buildings (academic 1 is 5 storied and academic 2 is 10 storied), two male student halls, three female student halls, a 5 storied auditorium, one 4 storied library building. The well furnished central library equipped with online library facilities has 10,000 printed books and 1500 printed journals apart from numerous e-books and e-journals. It has also four teacher's and officer's dormitories, one staff dormitories, vice chancellor's building and a mosque as well as a guest house. The construction of NSTU medical centre is also completed. There are two sport field and two big ponds in the campus area. It has a canteen for students called NSTU cafeteria. It has also a martyr monument like a fountain pen and a sculpture of liberation war. A park called Varsity park is also decorated for students leisure time with different kind of trees, benches and an octagonal cafeteria.

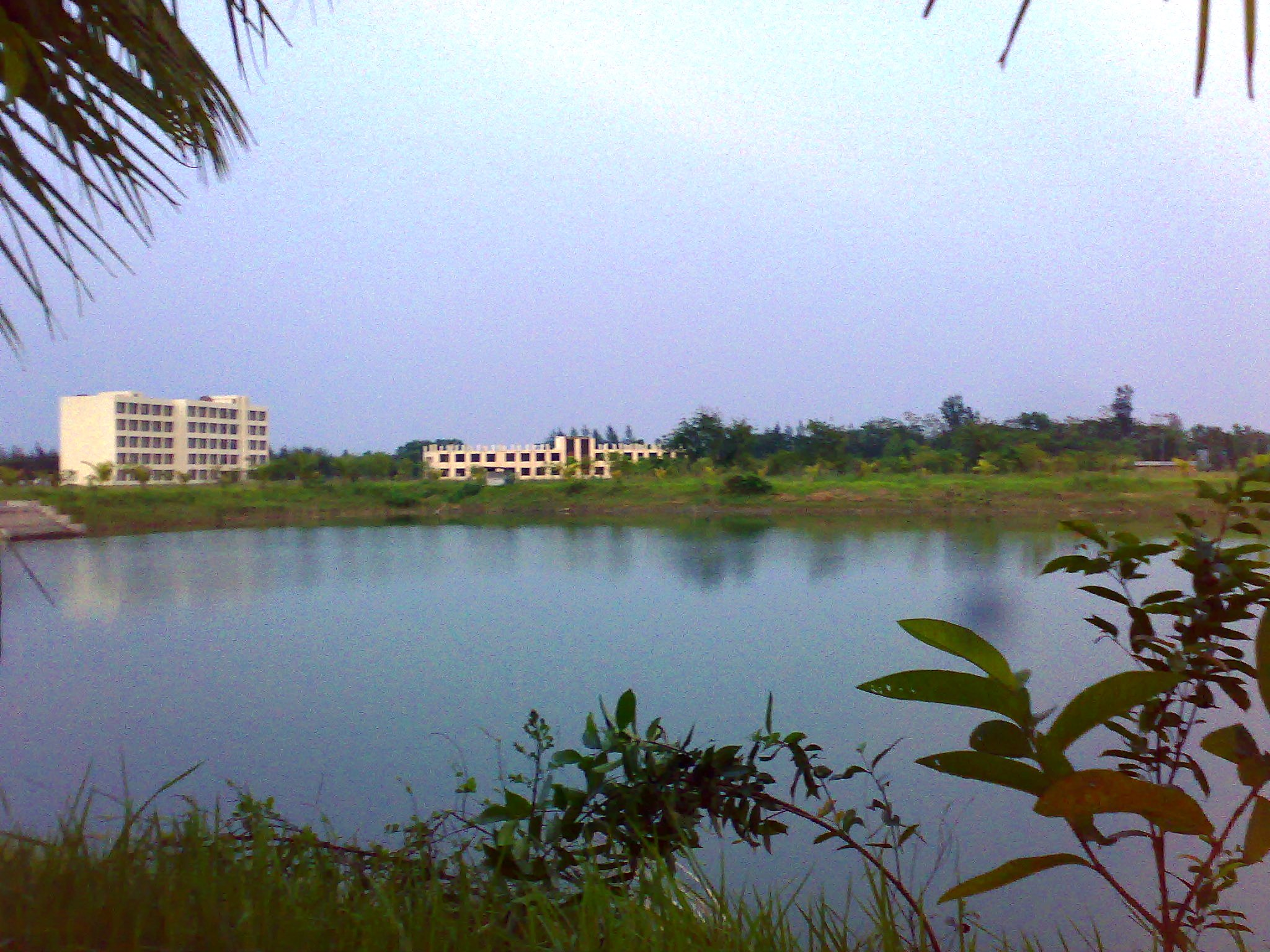
A view of NSTU from University's Lake

=== Landscape ===
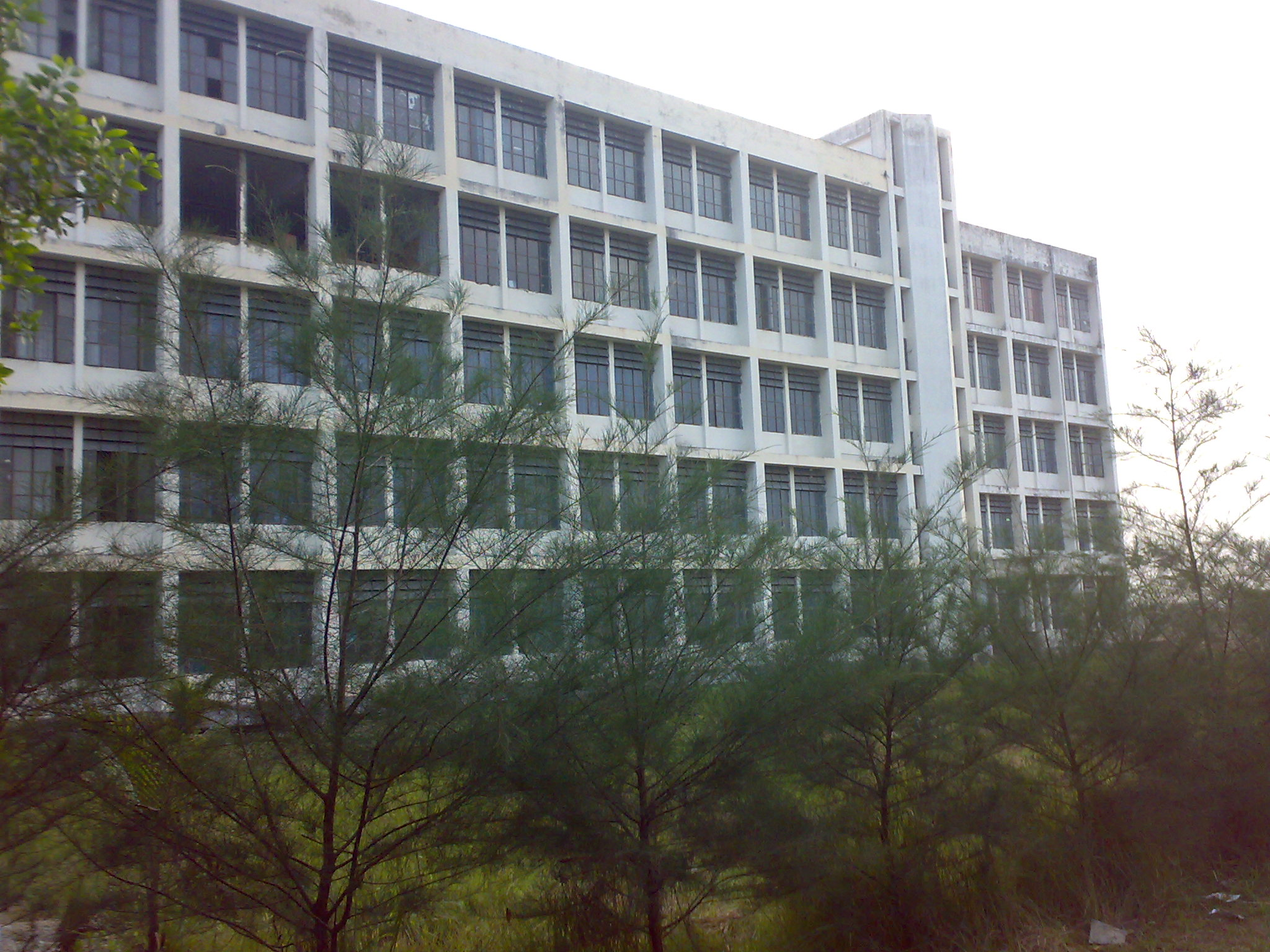
Academic building-1, NSTU

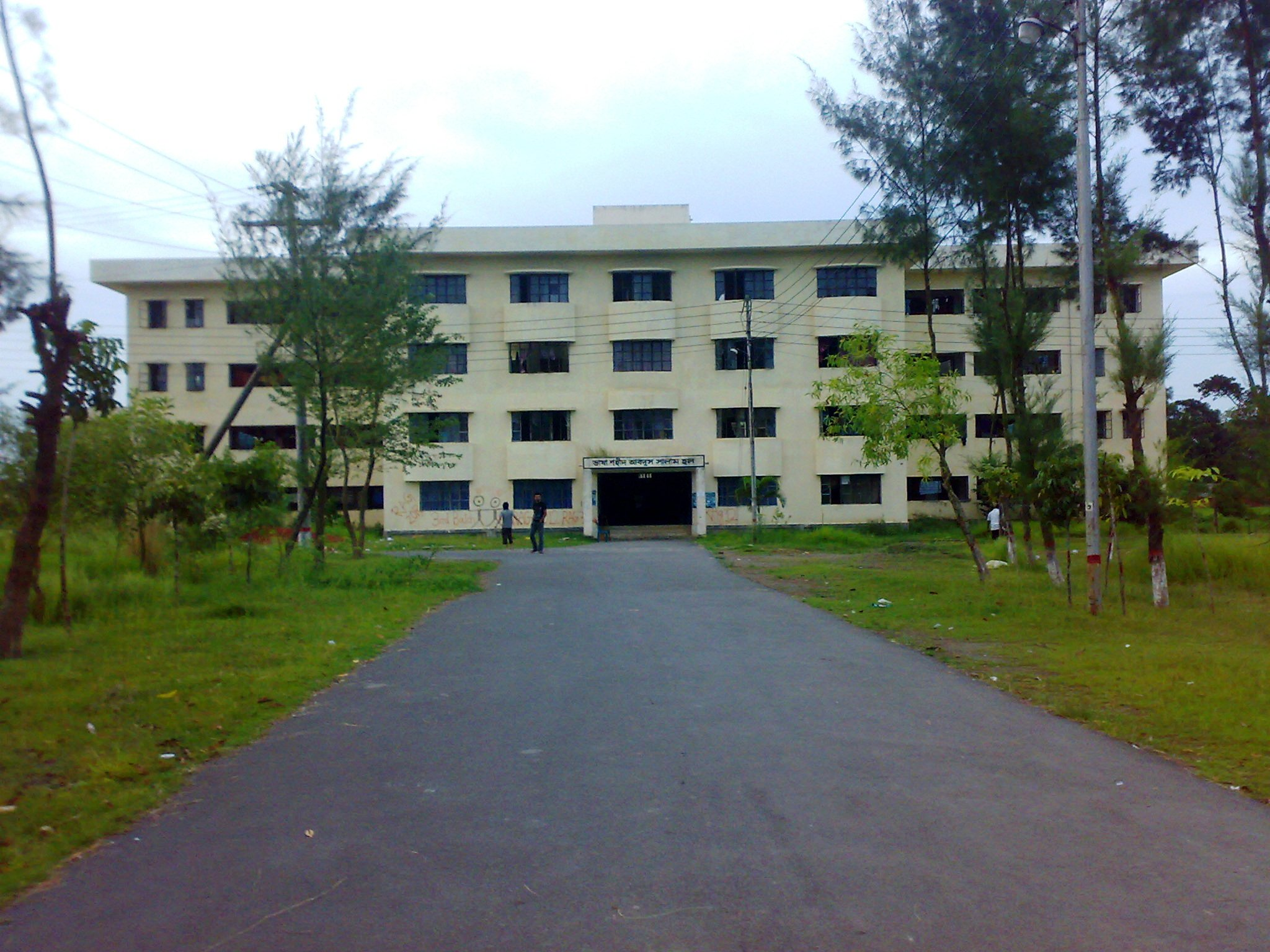
Vasha Sahid Abdus Salam Hall, Front Block Administrative building of Noakhali Science and Technology University, Noakhali, Bangladesh. The Central Shaheed Minar is visible on the left.

=== Residence halls ===
1. Vasha Sahid Abdus Salam Hall (ASH)
2. Bijoy 24 (July Shahid Smriti Hall)
3. Abdul Malek Ukil Hall (MUH)
4. Bibi Khadija Hall (BKH)
5. Nawab Faizunnesa Chowdhurani Hall (NFH)

== List of vice chancellors ==
Name	Duration
Abul Khair	(2005–2008)
Sanjoy Kumar Adhikary	(2008–2010)
A. K. M. Saidul Haque Chowdhury	(2010–2014)
M Wahiduzzaman	(2 June 2015 – 15 June 2019)
Md. Didar-ul-Alam	(16 June 2019 – 12 AUgust 2024)
Mohammad Ismail	(5 September 2024 – 14-May-2026)
Prof. Dr. Golam Rabbani	(14 May 2026 – Present)

== Academic facilities ==
The university has 31 departments under seven faculties and two institutes. The faculties are:

- Faculty of Engineering & Technology
- Faculty of Science
- Faculty of Biological Science
- Faculty of Social Sciences and Humanities
- Faculty of Business Administration
- Faculty of Education Sciences
- Faculty of Law

All above courses are undergraduate and postgraduate levels.

The institutes are:

- Institute of Information Technology
- Institute of Information Sciences

The institutes offer undergraduate and diploma level degrees.

Faculty/Institute	Department	Seat
Institute of Information Sciences	Information Sciences and Library Management (ISLM)	37
Institute of Information Technology	Software Engineering (IIT)	35
Faculty of Engineering & Technology	Computer Science and Telecommunication Engineering (CSTE)	46
Faculty of Engineering & Technology	Applied Chemistry and Chemical Engineering (ACCE)	46
Faculty of Engineering & Technology	Information and Communication Engineering (ICE)	46
Faculty of Engineering & Technology	Electrical and Electronics Engineering (EEE)	30
Faculty of Science	Applied Mathematics	46
Faculty of Science	Statistics	50
Faculty of Science	Oceanography	37
Faculty of Science	Chemistry	50
Faculty of Science	Physics	50
Faculty of Science	Environmental Science and Disaster Management (ESDM)	41
Faculty of Biological Science	Fisheries and Marine Science (FIMS)	50
Faculty of Biological Science	Pharmacy	46
Faculty of Biological Science	Microbiology	42
Faculty of Biological Science	Biochemistry and Molecular Biology (BMB)	37
Faculty of Biological Science	Food Technology and Nutrition Science (FTNS)	27
Faculty of Biological Science	Biotechnology and Genetic Engineering (BGE)	37
Faculty of Biological Science	Agriculture	50
Faculty of Biological Science	Soil, Water & Environmental Sciences (SWES)	50
Faculty of Biological Science	Zoology	27
Faculty of Social Sciences and Humanities	English	45
Faculty of Social Sciences and Humanities	Economics	58
Faculty of Social Sciences and Humanities	Political Sciences	45
Faculty of Social Sciences and Humanities	Bangla	46
Faculty of Social Sciences and Humanities	Sociology	45
Faculty of Social Sciences and Humanities	Social Work	46
Faculty of Business Administration	Business Administration (DBA)	63
Faculty of Business Administration	Tourism and Hospitality Management (THM)	44
Faculty of Business Administration	Management Information Systems (MIS)	44
Faculty of Education Sciences	Education	45
Faculty of Education Sciences	Educational Administration	39
Faculty of Law	Law	49

== Ranking ==
=== Bangladesh ranking ===
In the local universities ranking, Noakhali Science and Technology University was placed as 14th overall and multi-disciplinary category out of 136 ranked universities (public and private) and also placed as 2nd science and technology university out of 09 in 2016 while in 2006.

=== Web ranking ===
In 2018, the NSTU was placed as 6271 into the top list of World Universities and placed as 621 into the top list of "South Asian Universities" in the ranking carried out by the web ranking.

=== International ranking ===
In 2011–2012, the Noakhali Science and Technology University made it into the list of "Top World Universities" in the ranking carried out by the ranking agency Times Higher Education and Quacquarelli Symonds, UK. Out of over 30,000 universities around the world, NSTU was placed as 11203. Recently it has been ranked between 1201 and 1500 range in the Times Higher Education (THE) World University Rankings 2026. Among Bangladesh, NSTU holds the 12th position in this global ranking

== Co-curricular activities ==
=== Coastal Environment Network ===
Coastal Environment Network, also known as ("কোয়েন" in Bengali), is a departmental club from the department of Environmental Science and Disaster Management of the Noakhali Science and Technology University (NSTU) that is concerned with various environmental issues. It was established in 2014. After one year of establishment, it was officially inaugurated by M Wahiduzzaman, Vice Chancellor of the Noakhali Science and Technology University. The club has celebrated many environmentally days with the coordination of the Department of Environment including World Environment Day. It also organizes various environmental workshops, Olympiads, and programs concerning the recent environmental issues. The Coastal Environment Network (CoEN) facilitates networking among environmental organizations and others who share its mandate to protect the Earth and promote ecologically sound ways of life. The CoEN works directly with concerned citizens and organizations striving to protect, preserve, and restore the environment. Its motto is "Move Towards Sustainable Development".

NSTU MODEL UNITED NATIONS ASSOCIATION

NSTUMUNA regularly hosts MUN conferences focusing on diplomacy, leadership & negotiations.

Programming Clubs

There are various programming clubs at NSTU that organize competitions, seminars, courses, and competitive programming events. Such CSTE Club, ICE Programming Club, IT_Club etc.

Other:

Some other organisations such as NSTUDS, Royal Economics Club, SILSWA-NSTU, Dhropad, NSTU Adventure Club, Cholo Paltai, CSTE Club, IT_Club etc. are working in the campus and beyond.
