= Md. Didar-ul-Alam =

Vice-Chancellor of Noakhali Science and Technology University
- In office 16 June 2019 – 20 August 2024
- Preceded by: M Wahiduzzaman
- Succeeded by: Mohammad Ismail

Md. Didar-ul-Alam is a Bangladeshi academic and the a former Vice-chancellor of Noakhali Science and Technology University from 2019 to 2024. He was reappointed for the second term in 2023. He resigned on 20 August 2024.

== Early life ==
Didar-ul-Alam was born on 8 December 1954 in Narayanganj District, East Bengal, Pakistan. He completed his SSC at Joy Govinda High School and HSC at Government Tolaram College in 1969 and 1971 (held in 1972 due to Bangladesh Liberation War) respectively. He did his bachelor's and master's degrees in soil sciences at the University of Dhaka in 1977 and 1979 respectively.

== Career ==
Alam worked for a project of the University Grants Commission from 1 March 1981 to 5 March 1982 as a research associate. From 6 March 1982 to 28 September 1983, he worked as a researcher at the River Research Institute. On 29 September 1983, he joined the University of Dhaka as a lecturer. On 7 February 1987, he was promoted to assistant professor.

Alam was promoted to associate professor on 20 March 1993. He was promoted to full professor on 15 December 1997. He became a Selection Grade Professor on 29 September 2011.

From 30 June 2018 to 12 June 2019, Alam was the Chairman of the Department of Soil, Water and Environment at the University of Dhaka. On 13 June 2020, he was appointed Vice-Chancellor of Noakhali Science and Technology University by President Muhammad Abdul Hamid. In July 2021, he was criticized by the University Grants Commission for drawing rent despite staying the official bungalow violating financial rules. It was also critical of him using two vehicles of the university one on campus while the other in Dhaka, allegedly used by his family. In August 2022, he visited the Bangabandhu's Mausoleum at Tungipara to pay respect to the former President Sheikh Mujibur Rahman with a delegation of the NSTU Teachers Association.
