= Mohammad Shahedul Anam Khan =

- Military career
- Allegiance: Bangladesh; Pakistan (before 1971)
- Branch: Bangladesh Army; Pakistan Army
- Service years: 1968–2000
- Rank: Brigadier General
- Unit: Army Service Corps
- Commands: Director General of Bangladesh Institute of International and Strategic Studies; Station Commander, Sylhet; Director of Military Intelligence of Army Headquarters; Commandant of School of Military Intelligence
- Conflicts: Bangladesh Liberation War; UNIIMOG

Brigadier General Mohammad Shahedul Anam Khan is a retired Bangladesh Army officer and defence analyst. He is an associate editor of The Daily Star.

== Career ==
Khan received his commission in the Pakistan Army in 1968. He studied at the Royal Military College of Science and Staff College, Camberley.

Khan graduated from the National Defence College in 1988.

Anam was the CMO of the United Nations Military Observer Group in Iraq from 1990 to 1991. From 30 March 1991 to 6 March 1994, he served as the station commander of the Jalalabad Cantonment.

From 1997 to 2000, Anam was the director general of the Bangladesh Institute of International and Strategic Studies. He served in Bangladesh Army headquarters as the director of military intelligence and later as the director of military operations.
