= Siddiqur Rahman Sarker =

Bangladeshi military personnel

Siddiqur Rahman Sarker SGP

Chairman of Rajdhani Unnayan Kartripakkha
- In office 4 April 2024 – 8 March 2025
- Preceded by: Md Anisur Rahman Miah
- Succeeded by: Md Riazul Islam

Personal details
- Born: 10 August 1963 Narsingdi, East Pakistan, Pakistan
- Died: 24 October 2025 (aged 62) Faridpur, Bangladesh
- Education: Bangladesh University of Engineering and Technology

Military service
- Allegiance: Bangladesh
- Branch/service: Bangladesh Army; Border Guard Bangladesh
- Years of service: 1983–2019
- Rank: Major General
- Unit: Corps of Engineers
- Commands: Sector Commander of BGB; Commander of 14th Independent Engineers Brigade; Area Commander of Logistics Area; Commandant of Military Institute of Science and Technology; Engineer in Chief of Army Headquarters
- Awards: Sena Gourab Padak(SGP)

Siddiqur Rahman Sarker (Note: SGP, BGBM, PBGM, hdmc, psc) was a two-star officer and engineer-in-chief of the Bangladesh Army. He was commandant of the Military Institute of Science and Technology and chairman of Rajdhani Unnayan Kartripakkha.

== Early life and education ==
Sarker was born on 10 August 1963 in Narsingdi, East Pakistan. He enrolled in the Bangladesh Military Academy on 22 January 1982 with the 9th BMA long course. On 23 December 1983, he was commissioned into the corps of engineers. He studied civil engineering at the Bangladesh University of Engineering and Technology, where he earned a BSc and an MSc. He also graduated from Defence Services Command and Staff College and completed a master's degree in defence studies from the National University of Bangladesh. At Osmania University in India, he finished another master's degree in management.

== Military career ==
Sarker commanded an engineers brigade, was a sector commander of the Border Guard Bangladesh after the Bangladesh Rifles revolt in 2009, and was area commander, logistics area. In January 2013, he was promoted to major general. He was the commandant of the Military Institute of Science and Technology. Sarker was the engineer-in-chief of the Bangladesh Army till his leave per retirement in February 2019.

=== Post-military ===
Sarker was appointed chairman of Rajdhani Unnayan Kartripakkha on 4 April 2024 during the fifth Hasina ministry. His contract was cancelled on 17 September 2024 by the Yunus ministry. He was reinstated, however, on 22 September and served till March 2025.

The Anti-Corruption Commission investigated alleged corruption by Sarker. On 17 April 2025, the High Court Division imposed a travel ban on him and his wife. On 19 May 2025, the government froze his and his wife's stock holdings.

== Death ==
Sarker died of a heart attack in Faridpur, Bangladesh, on 24 October 2025.

== Awards ==
Sarkar received two notable awards.

- President Border Guard Medal for role as sector commander after the Bangladesh Rifles Mutiny
- Sena Gourab Padak from Bangladesh Army for his service from 2011 to 2012
