= Anjuman Mufidul Islam =

Bangladeshi welfare organisation

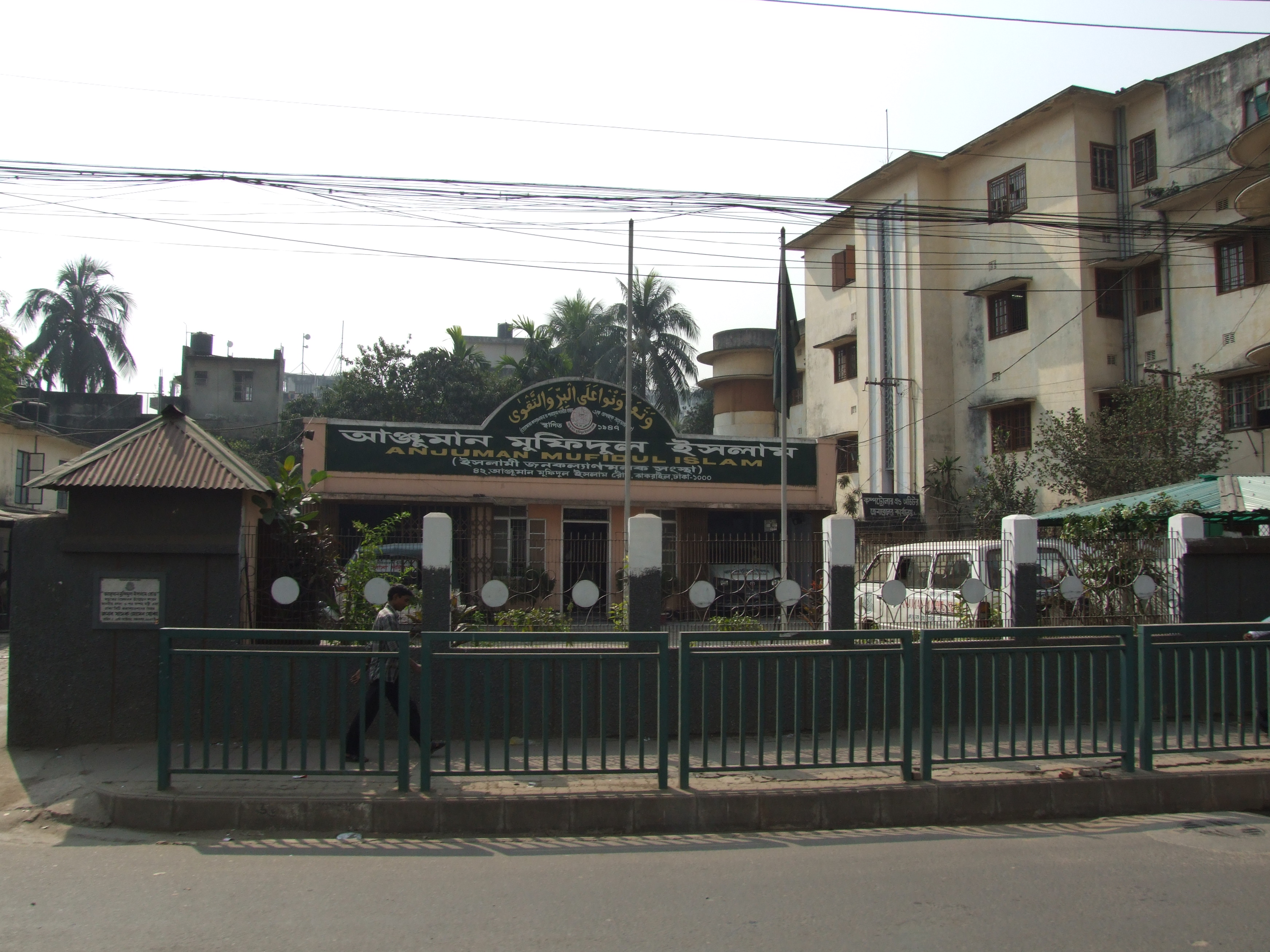
- Anjuman Mufidul Islam headquarters in Dhaka
- Formation: 1905
- Type: Organisation
- Headquarters: Dhaka, Bangladesh
- Region served: Bangladesh, India
- President: Mufleh R Osmani
- Website: www.anjumanmibd.org

Anjuman Mufidul Islam (Bengali: আঞ্জুমান মফিদুল ইসলাম Beneficial Assembly of Islam) is a Bangladeshi welfare organisation specially designed to enrich the livelihood of orphans and the distressed.

== History ==
Sheikh Ibrahim Mohammed Dupley, a resident of Surat, formed Anjuman Mufidul Islam in Kolkata in 1905. Khawaja Nazimuddin, A. K. Fazlul Huq, Huseyn Shaheed Suhrawardy successfully directed the activities of this organisation as presidents. After the Partition of India in 1947, the Anjuman's chief administrative officer S.M. Salahuddin along with officials such as Abdul Haque Faridi managed to set up a branch in SK Das Road, Gandaria, Dhaka in September 1947. Faridi was made the first president of Dhaka's Anjuman serving from 1947 to 1949. In 1950, the Anjuman became an independent organisation.

The Anjuman organised a movement for the education of poor Muslims, and established public libraries and organized debates. In addition to these activities, its important work was to bury unclaimed dead bodies of Muslims.

Mufleh R Osmani, a former Foreign Secretary ( 1993–1995) of the Govt of Bangladesh, is the current President, having been elected in 2019. In September 2019, Prime Minister Sheikh Hasina 100 million BDT to the Anjuman Mufidul Islam for constructing Anjuman JR Tower, 15 story building.

== Services ==
- Ambulance Service
- Burial Service
- Orphanage
- Educational Programmes

== Orphanages ==
Presently there are 350 orphans living in 9 orphanages as of 14 May 2019. Source: Anjuman Mufidul Islam. In the capital city and its adjacent area:

1. Anjuman sheth ibrahim Muhammad Dupley Boys Home, Gendaria Dhaka. 83 boys live here.
2. 120 girls live in Anjuman ABMG Kibria Girls Home, Gendaria Dhaka.
3. Anjuman Jamil Hasmot-Ara Girls Home, Tolla Narayanganj. 32 Girls live here.
4. Anjuman Azizul Islam girls home, Savar, Dhaka. 17 Girls live here.
5. Anjuman Dr. Rokshana Huda Girls Home, Tejgaon, Dhaka. 5 Girls live here.

Orphanages in the countryside:

1. Anjuman Mufidul Islam Orphanage, EPZ Road, Tomsom Bridge, Comilla. 35 boys and 20 girls live here. Total 52
2. Anjuman Mobarok Hossain Rotno Orphanage, DC Road, Pabna. 40 boys and 40 girls live here. Total 80.
3. Anjuman Musa Mia Shishu shodon (Children's Home), Shatpai NetroKona. 20 Boys and 4 Girls live here. Total 60.
4. Anjuman Mufidul Islam Anwara Zakaria, Orphanage, Hali City, Chittagong. 55 Boys and 100 Girls live here. Total 155.

== Educational institutions ==
- Anjuman Jamilur Rahman Islamia Junior High School
- Anjuman Raihana Mahbub Junior High School
- Anjuman Mufidul Islam Technical Institute
- Anjuman Ridwan Rahman Technical Institute
- Anjuman Raihana Mahbub Technical Institute
- Anjuman Mokhlesur Rahman Polytechnique Institute

== Management board ==
=== Trustees ===
- Mufleh Rahman Osmani President/Trustee
- Alhaj Md. Hasan Uddin Mollah
- M Hafizuddin Khan
- Alhaj Kazi Abul Bashar
- Mohammad Azim Buksh
- Lion Abdur Rashid (Rashed) M.J.F
- Shahidullah Minu,
- Prof. Md. Khalilur Rahman
- Alhaj Mohammad Aslam
- Md. Shamsul Haque
- Mr. Morshed Ahmed Chowdhury
- Mr. Mokhlesur Rahman.

=== Vice presidents ===
- Mr. A Q M Fazlul Bari
- Sayed Nazir Ahmed
- Alhaj Abdus Salam
- Mr. Shish Haydar Chowdhury
- Ambassador (Retd.) Alhaj Mohammad Mohsin
- Ambassador (Retd.) Dr. M. A Samad
- Ms Mitali Hossain
- Engg. Moid Rumi
- Mr. Golam Ashraf Talukder
- Mr. Golam Rahman
- Alhaj Fayejur Rahman
