= Hasan Uz Zaman =

Major General of the Bangladesh Army

- Military career
- Allegiance: Bangladesh
- Branch: Bangladesh Army
- Service years: 1992 – present
- Rank: Major General
- Unit: Corps of Engineers
- Commands: Engineer-in-Chief at Army Headquarters; Station Commander, Jessore; Commandant of Engineers Center and School of Military Engineering

Hasan Uz Zaman (Bengali: হাসান-উজ-জামান) is a major general of the Bangladesh Army. As of September 9, 2024, he holds the position of Engineer-in-Chief at the Army Headquarters in Dhaka Cantonment.

== Career ==
Hasan Uz Zaman serves as a principal staff officer and a technical advisor to the Chief of Army Staff on matters related to combat engineering and military works. He is also the head of the Military Engineer Services and has technical control over the Corps of Engineers.

Zaman is an alumnus of the 26th BMA Long Course and is from the Corps of Engineers. He also holds an M.Phil degree. He is a member of the board of trustees for several Bangladesh Army universities, including the Bangladesh Army University of Engineering & Technology (BAUET) and Bangladesh Army International University of Science and Technology (BAIUST).
