= M Wahiduzzaman =

- Occupation: Academic
- Known for: Higher education administration
- Title: Professor

Academic background
- Education: University of Nottingham; University of Dhaka

M Wahiduzzaman is a Bangladeshi academic and professor at the Institute of Education and Research, University of Dhaka. He served as the Vice-Chancellor of Noakhali Science and Technology University from 31 May 2015 to 30 June 2019.

== Early life and education ==
Wahiduzzaman obtained both his Bachelor of Laws and Master of Laws degrees from the University of Dhaka. He earned a Master of Education in Educational Administration from the Institute of Education and Research at the University of Dhaka in 1993. He completed his Doctor of Philosophy in the School of Education at the University of Nottingham in 2005.

== Career ==
Wahiduzzaman joined the Institute of Education and Research at the University of Dhaka, where he became a professor in July 2008. He served as Chairman of the Department of Educational Administration at the Institute of Education and Research from January 2006 to January 2009. He is a member of the Dhaka University Progressive Teachers Association (Blue Panel).

In April 2013, Wahiduzzaman filed a writ petition with the High Court seeking action against writer Hasnat Abdul Hye over a controversial short story published in Prothom Alo, arguing that it was provocative and insulting to women. The High Court Division rejected the petition.

In May 2015, Wahiduzzaman was appointed Vice-Chancellor of Noakhali Science and Technology University by President Mohammad Abdul Hamid. From 31 May 2015 to 30 June 2019, he served as the Vice-Chancellor of Noakhali Science and Technology University. Md. Anwarul Bashar of Noakhali Science and Technology University filed a petition with the High Court Division questioning his appointment as Vice-Chancellor of the university in June 2017. The High Court issued a verdict in his favor.

Wahiduzzaman has also served as a member of academic councils at several universities in Bangladesh as a Chancellor's nominee, including the University of Chittagong, Shahjalal University of Science and Technology, and Jagannath University. In August 2023, Wahiduzzaman was accused by a group of students at the University of Dhaka of making remarks about hijab-wearing students during a viva examination, which led to a protest on campus demanding action against him. According to media reports, the students alleged that he had labelled certain students as “extremist”.
