= A. K. M. Saidul Haque Chowdhury =

Bangladeshi academic

Third Vice-chancellor

Noakhali University of Science and Technology
- In office 2010–2014
- Preceded by: Sanjay Kumar Adhikari
- Succeeded by: M. Ahiduzzaman

Personal details
- Born: Bangladesh
- Occupation: Professor, university administrator

A. K. M. Saidul Haque Chowdhury is a Bangladeshi agronomist and educationist. He was a professor in the Department of Agronomy, Bangladesh Agricultural University and the third vice-chancellor of the Noakhali University of Science and Technology.

== Career ==
Chowdhury taught in the Department of Agronomy at Bangladesh Agricultural University. He served as a member of the Board of Regents of Mawlana Bhashani Science and Technology University, among other important positions.

Chowdhury served as the third Vice-Chancellor of Noakhali University of Science and Technology from 2010 to 2014.
