= Bangladesh Armed Forces in United Nations peacekeeping missions =

United Nations peacekeeping mission

Bangladesh Armed Forces in United Nations peacekeeping missions (Bangladesh highlighted in dark green).

The Bangladesh Armed Forces and the Bangladesh Police have been actively involved in a number of United Nations Peace Support Operations (UNPSO) since 1988. As of 2024, Bangladesh is the largest contributor in the UN peacekeeping missions.

Bangladesh has several responsibilities in the UN peacekeeping mission. There are helicopter pilots who serve as peacekeepers for the UN. They are locally trained so they have to face several unknown threats and challenges. They have been trained in a different terrain therefore making their job easier.

== History ==
Bangladesh's first deployments came in 1988, when it participated in two operations - UNIIMOG in Iraq and UNTAG in Namibia. the then former President of Bangladesh Lieutenant General Hussain Muhammad Ershad initiated these deployments in 1988 for the first time with UNIIMOG with 15 military observers.

Later as part of the UNIKOM force deployed to Kuwait following the Gulf War, the Bangladesh Army sent a mechanized infantry brigade of approximately 2,193 personnel. In 1994, 1,200 Bangladeshi peacekeepers were besieged by Bosnian Serbs in the Bosnia after replacing a French contingent during UNPROFOR operations. The Bangladeshi commander asked for NATO air cover which was not provided. This was in contrast to when the French UN peacekeepers were attacked and NATO responded by providing cover. Over a hundred peacekeepers died in the region, including Bangladeshi soldiers. The Bangladeshi soldiers were underequipped. During the Rwandan Civil war, commander of UN forces in Rwanda General Roméo Dallaire alleged that Bangladeshi peacekeepers sabotaged their own vehicles in order to avoid going on patrols.

Since then, the Bangladesh Army has been involved in up to thirty different UNPKO's covering as many as twenty-five countries. This has included activities in Namibia, Cambodia, Somalia, Uganda, Rwanda, Mozambique, former Yugoslavia, Liberia, Haiti, Tajikistan, Western Sahara, Sierra Leone, Georgia, Congo, and Côte d'Ivoire. Bangladesh has sent its personnel to at least 45 UNPKO and more than 83,000 personnel of Bangladesh having served in those missions.

In 2005, nine Bangladeshi peacekeepers were killed in Congo. Bangladesh had 1,300 troops deployed in the country. In 2007, allegations of misconduct against Bangladesh peacekeepers based in South Sudan emerged. Some personnel were sent back to Bangladesh and faced disciplinary actions by the Bangladesh army. As of October 2014, Bangladesh contributed the highest number of total personnel to United Nations Peacekeeping Operations, with 8,758 personnel attached to various UN peacekeeping forces worldwide. In May 2015, one Bangladeshi peacekeeper was killed in a militant attack in Mali during MINUSMA. In 2015, Bangladesh deployed the first all-female peacekeeping unit in Haiti, composed of 160 Muslim female troops. The unit was the subject of the documentary Journey of a Thousand Miles: Peacekeepers. Bangladesh trains peacekeepers in the purpose-built BIPSOT (Bangladesh Institute of Peace Support Operation Training). In 2015, Bangladesh deployed boats to patrol the Niger River in Mali. Bangladeshi peacekeepers were also deployed in United Nations Mission in Sierra Leone (UNAMSIL). After the contribution made in the Sierra Leone Civil War, the government of Ahmad Tejan Kabbah declared Bengali an honorary official language in December 2002.

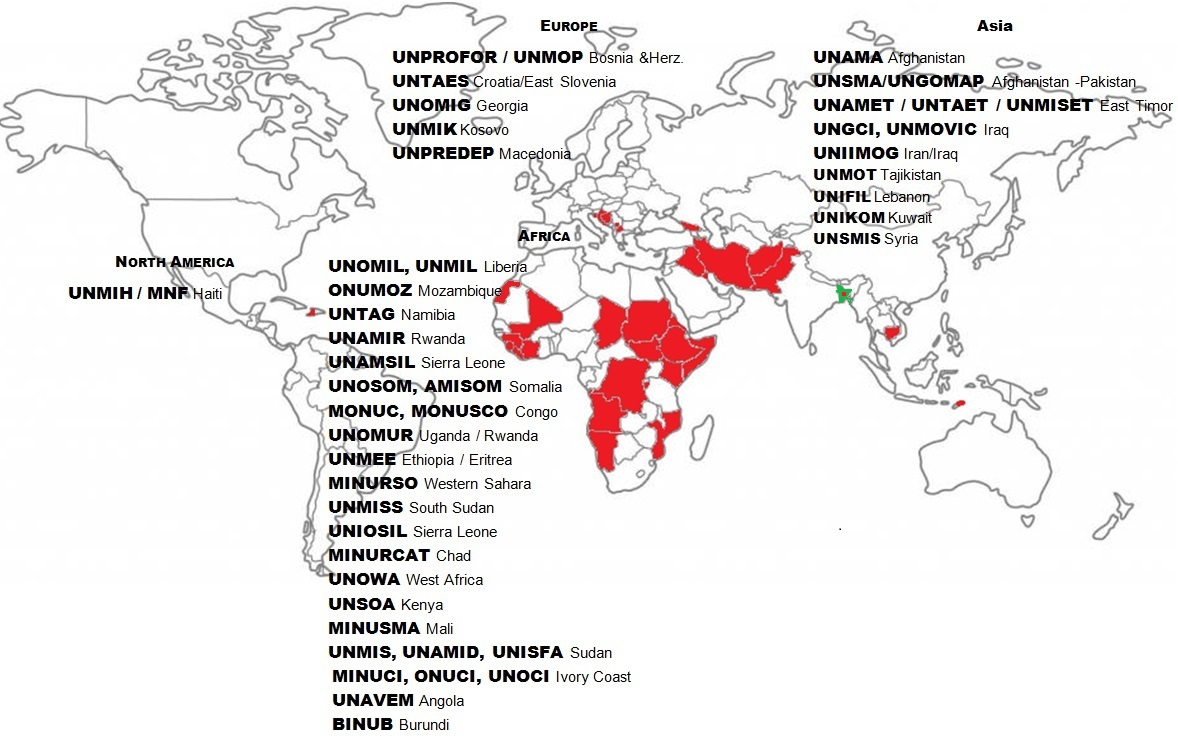
Map of all of the Bangladesh military's peacekeeping deployment.

Explanations why Bangladesh shows such a great commitment vary. One argument is that Bangladesh is able to improve its international reputation and build "soft power," which enables the country to claim relevant positions for its diplomats in UN organizations. Thus, Bangladesh wins both national pride and diplomatic benefits, including better working relations with neighboring countries such as India and Pakistan. Another argument posits that Bangladesh is able to give its military professional experience abroad, and keep it busy and away from disruptive influence at home, which has been a permanent concern for the civilian government. Finally, Bangladesh may gain financial and material benefits from deploying its forces under UN leadership because the UN pays higher salaries and relevant compensation. Bangladesh makes about US$300 million annually from peacekeeping, half of which is provided to the soldiers.In 2026, Bangladesh joined the GSF in Haiti as a part of peacekeeping mission during the Haitian Gang War.

== Roles and responsibilities ==
Women from Bangladesh also received opportunities to volunteer as a peacekeeper, setting a benchmark for all the other women in Bangladesh. This was a challenge for them. They were the first two females to be chosen as military pilots in 2014.

They work under Monusco Banair at the Democratic Republic of the Congo (DRC).

Their aim here is to help people in distress when they need their aid and help. Challenges are also a part of their mission. They are supported by instructors, which helps them continue their missions.

== Contributions ==
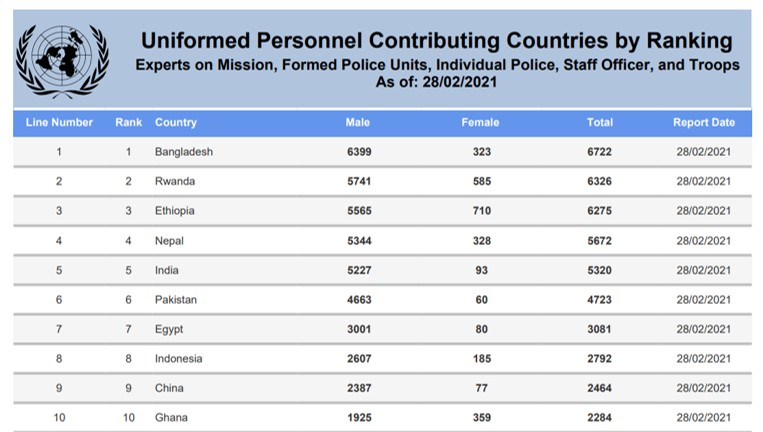
Bangladesh forces under Blue Helmet

Bangladesh has served and sacrificed for the UN for over 3 decades. Bangladesh is currently the largest troop-contributing country to UN peacekeeping. Bangladesh and the United Nations have a strong relationship.

- Bangladesh is one of the largest contributors to UN peacekeeping operations.
- First UN force to serve with the Organization in 1988, to help monitor the armistice between Iran and Iraq.
- A lot of medical teams supporting peacekeepers and people in remote regions.
- Delivering critical medical aid to remote communities
- Monitor political processes
- Facilitate humanitarian rights
- Protect civilians
- Provide necessary services
- Provide protection
- Repair and design infrastructure

== Ongoing peacekeeping missions participated by Bangladesh ==
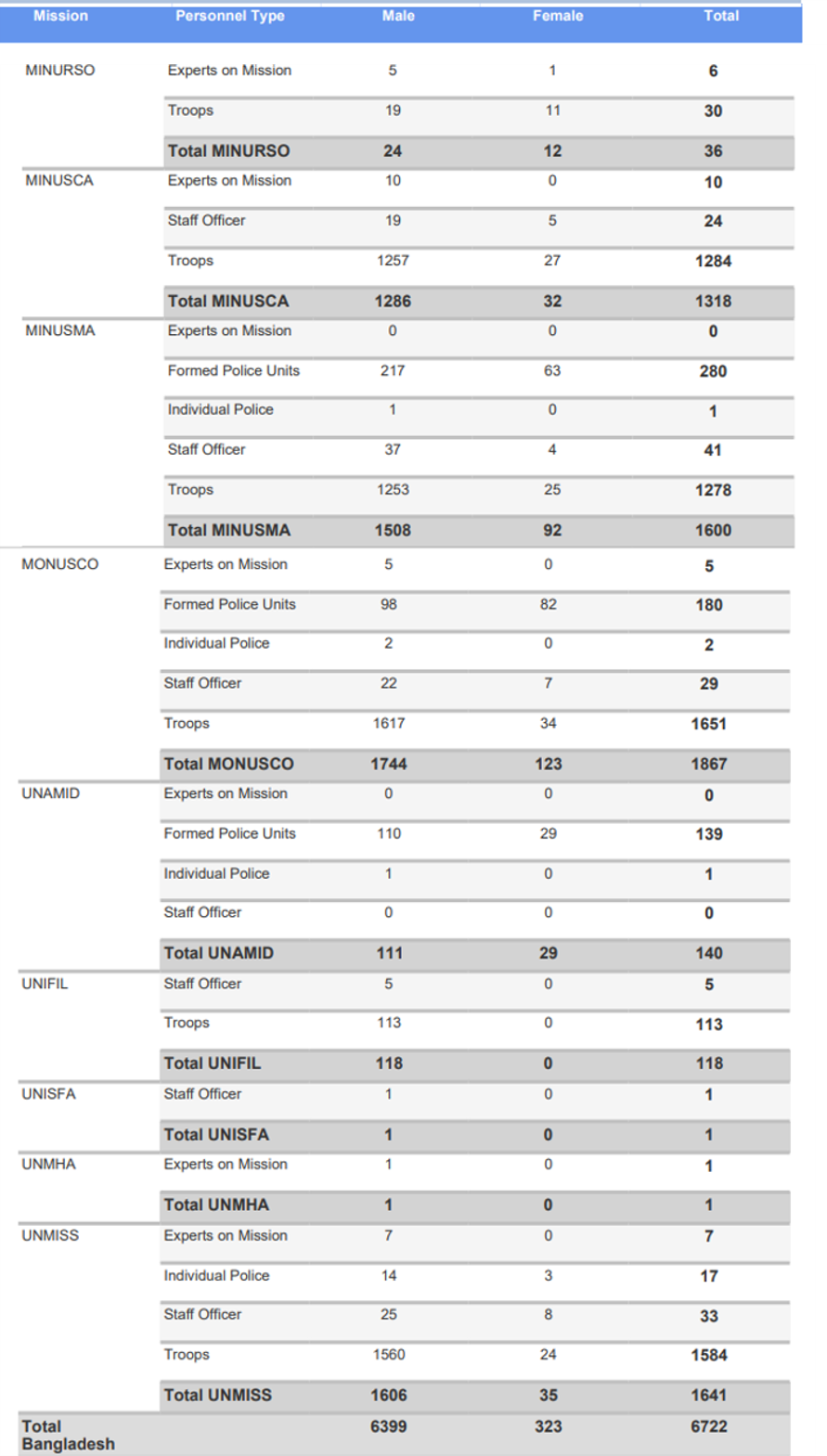
Contribution of bd forces

Presently from Bangladesh Army, Navy and Air Force are deployed in 11 ongoing UNPKOs in 5 countries where in UN peacekeepers total 6089. Within that more than 4,900 personnel from Bangladesh Army are now deployed in various contingents or as Staff Officers/Military Observers in 13 peacekeeping missions. Bangladesh Navy has its ships and water crafts deployed in UNMISS (South Sudan). The Air Force has its helicopters and fixed wing aircraft in MONUSCO (DR Congo) and MINUSTAH (Haiti). A good number of officers from Bangladesh Armed Forces are also working in UNDPKO as well.

In Liberia, communication network improved by Bangladeshi peacekeepers. The BANENGR-8, which is tasked to maintain and repair roads in Bong County, is making all out efforts to reestablish the communication network in the country. They repaired 81 km Gbarnga-Salala Road, 80 km Gbarnga-Ganta Road and 44 km Gbrnga-Zorzor Road. Also carried out repair work of an entry road from CARI Complex to UN Water Point and internal roads in Gbarnga city and constructed a connecting road near CARI, The BANENGR-7, deployed in Nimba County, constructed and repaired 101 km Ganta-Tappita Road, 26 km Sanniquelli-Loguatu Road and 2.85 km road under Ganta city. Twenty-two culverts were built. They also constructed the playground of an orphanage and two passenger-sheds and carried out development work and welfare activities of different organisations.

== Casualties ==
As a result of its contributions to various UN peacekeeping operations, 168 Bangladesh peacekeepers have lost their lives and at least 257 injured. The leader of the Bangladesh contingent to Namibia (UNTAG), Lieutenant Colonel Md. Faizul Karim, died in Windhoek, Namibia, in 1989. He was the first Bangladeshi officer who died on a peacekeeping mission abroad. 128 Bangladeshi Peacekeepers were posthumously awarded Dag Hammarskjöld Medals.

The performance of Bangladesh's contingents has been described as being of the highest order and the appointment of several senior Bangladesh military officers as the Commander of UN peacekeeping missions and Senior Military Liaison Officers, may be seen as further recognition of the Bangladesh Army's growing esteem in the peacekeeping community. In 2008, the BBC in described the Bangladeshi UN Force as "the cream of UN peacekeepers".

=== Awards ===
Members of the Bangladesh Police Women Contingent BANFPU-1, serving with the United Nations Organization Stabilization Mission in the Democratic Republic of the Congo (MONUSCO) in Kinshasa, were awarded the United Nations Peacekeeping Medal on 7 August 2025 in recognition of their service. 178 peacekeepers, among them 68 women recipients received the medal. Additionally, 23 Individual Police Officers (IPOs) serving in MONUSCO were jointly honoured. The contingent has been deployed in Kinshasa since 27 May 2024.

== Gallery ==
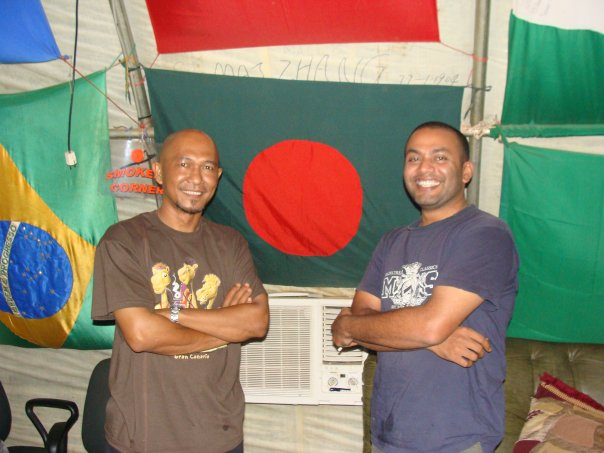
Bangladeshi Army personnel posing with the Bangladeshi national flag

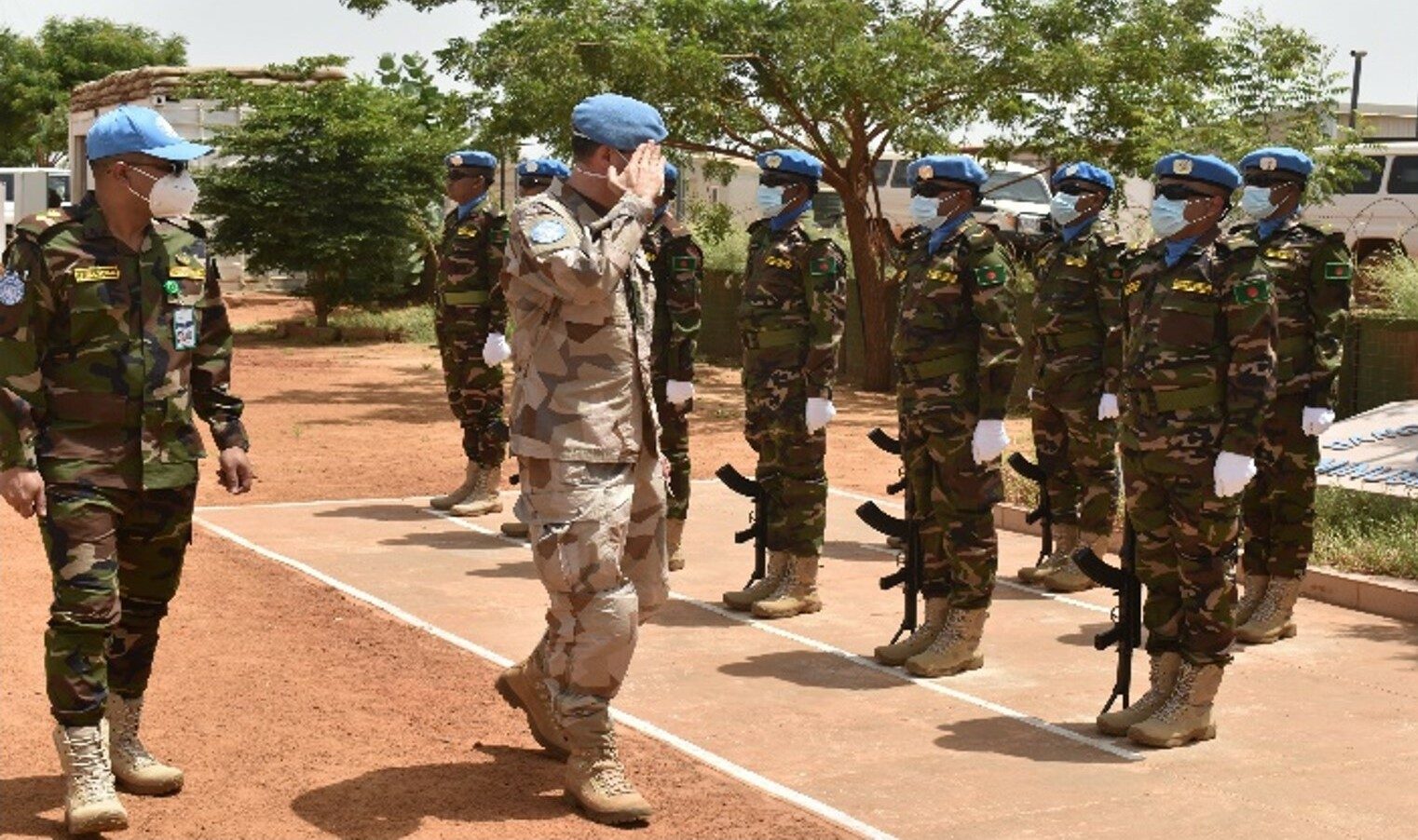
Lt Gen Dennis Gyllenspore, FC MINUSMA visiting BANSIG at GAO, Mali

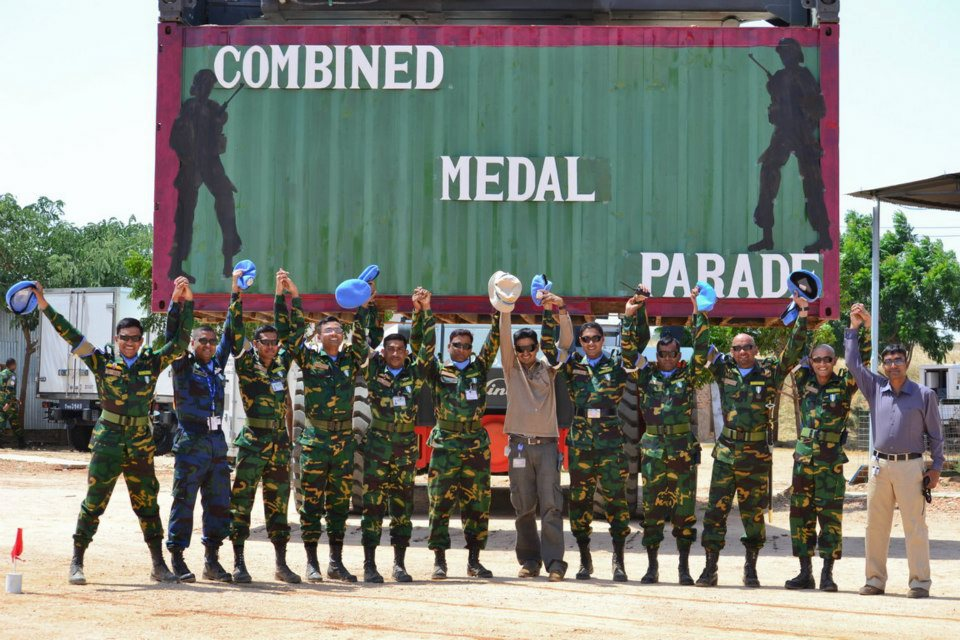
Medal parade of BANSRIC and BANMMRLU in UNAMID by FORCE CHIEF OF STAFF Brig Gen Shahid Mahmud

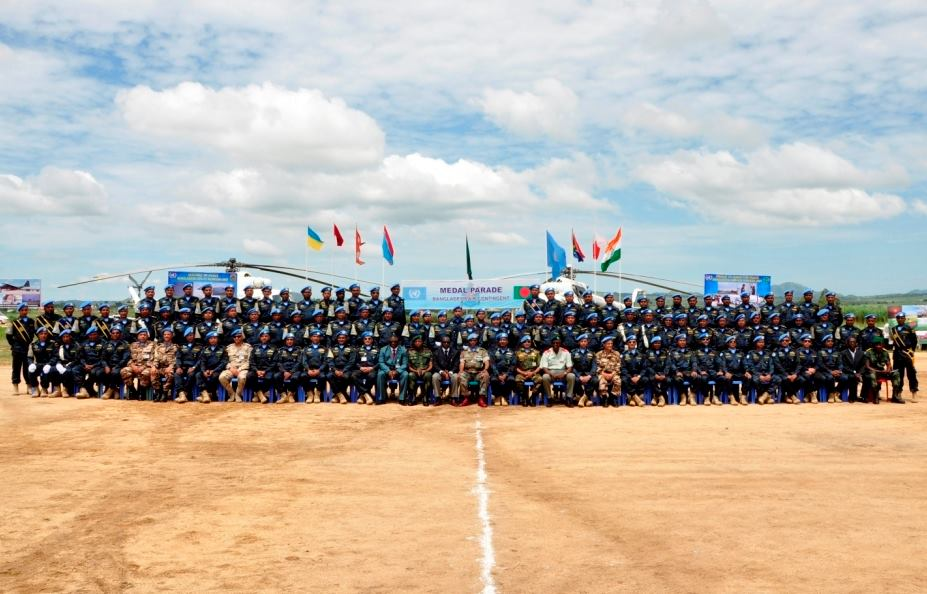
BANAIR-13 members at Bunia, Province Orientale, Republique democratique du Congo.

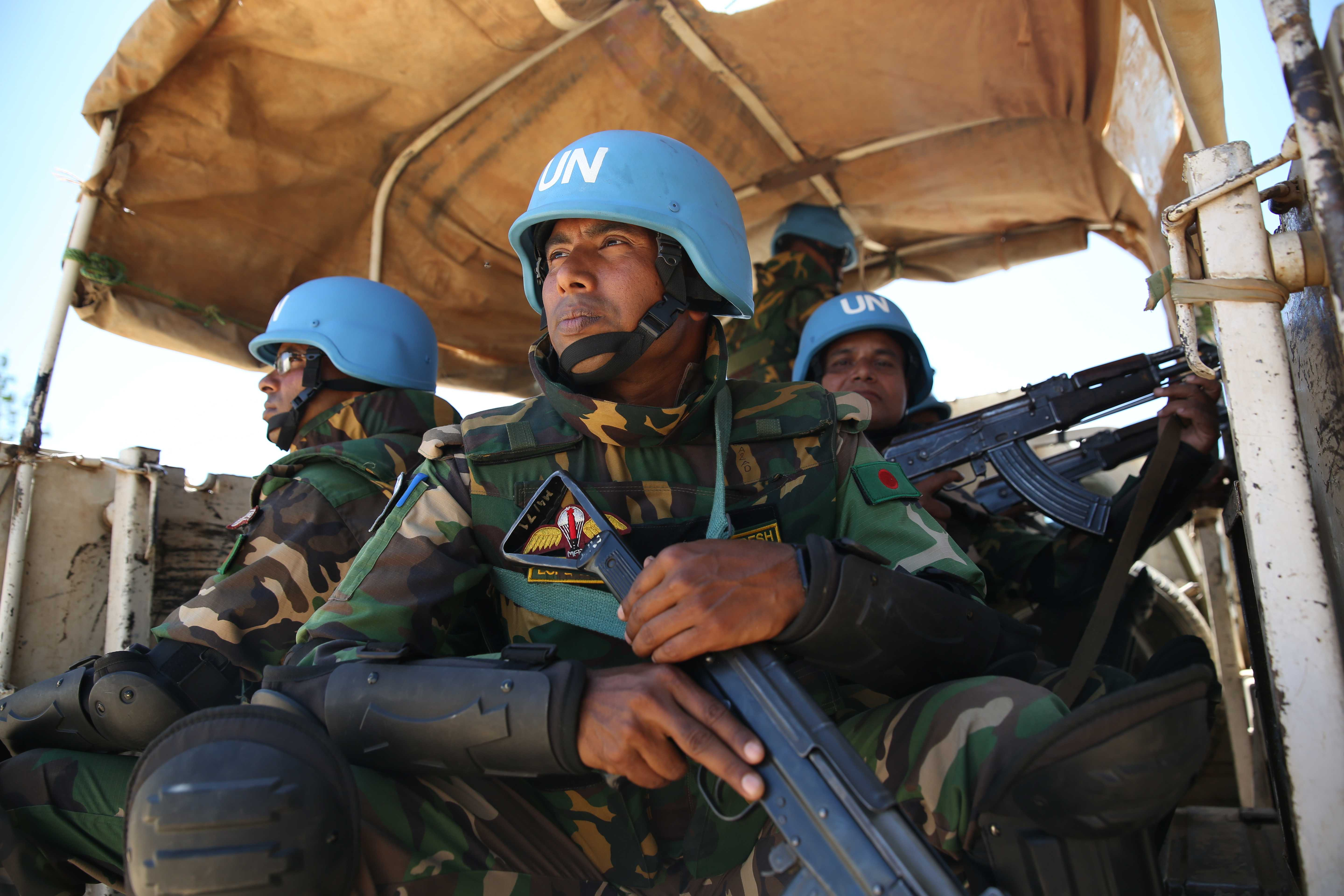
Bangladeshi peacekeepers of MONUSCO patrol around Bunia, DR Congo

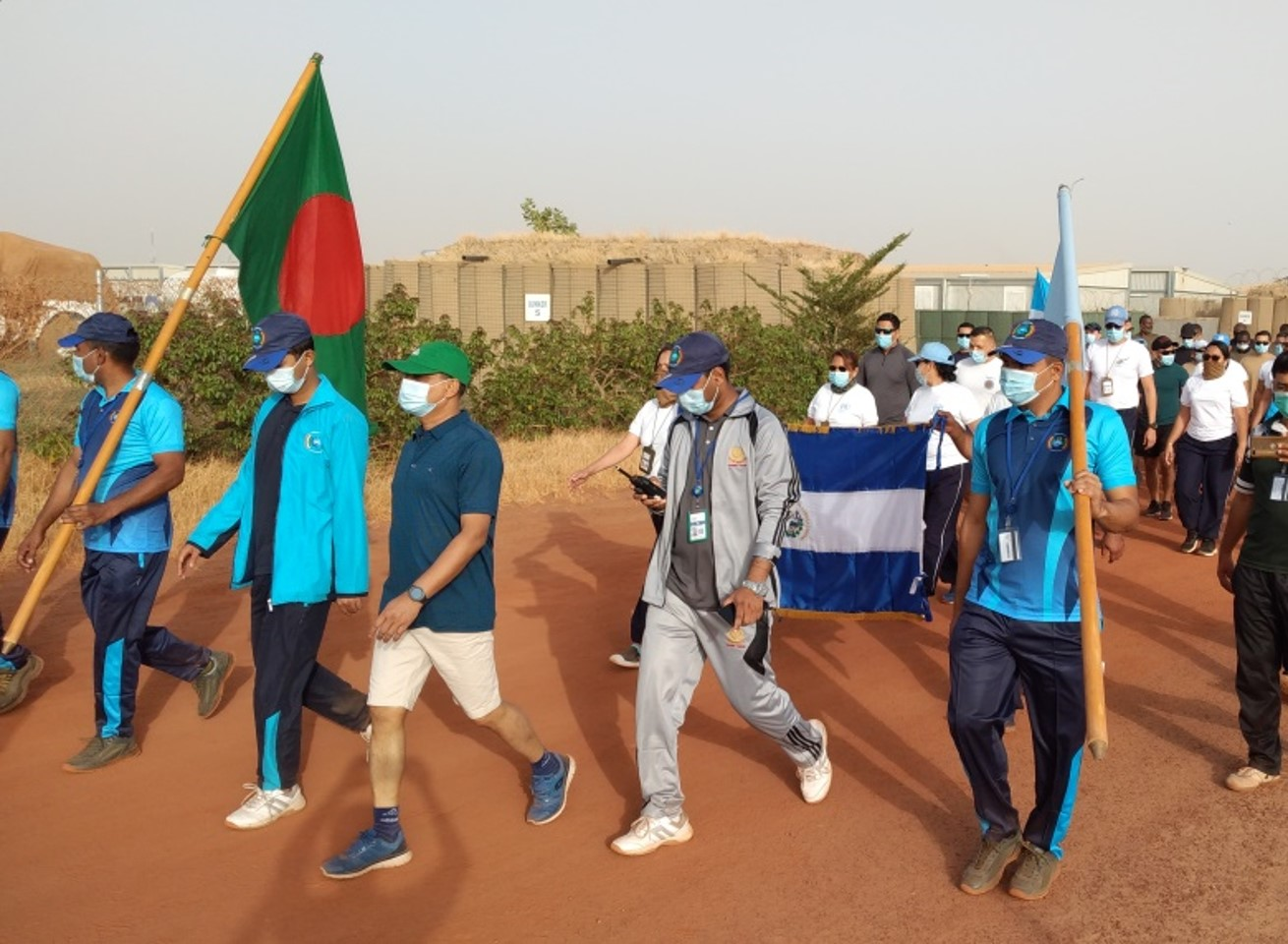
Bangladeshi forces at a United Nations Day programme in Timbuktu, Mali

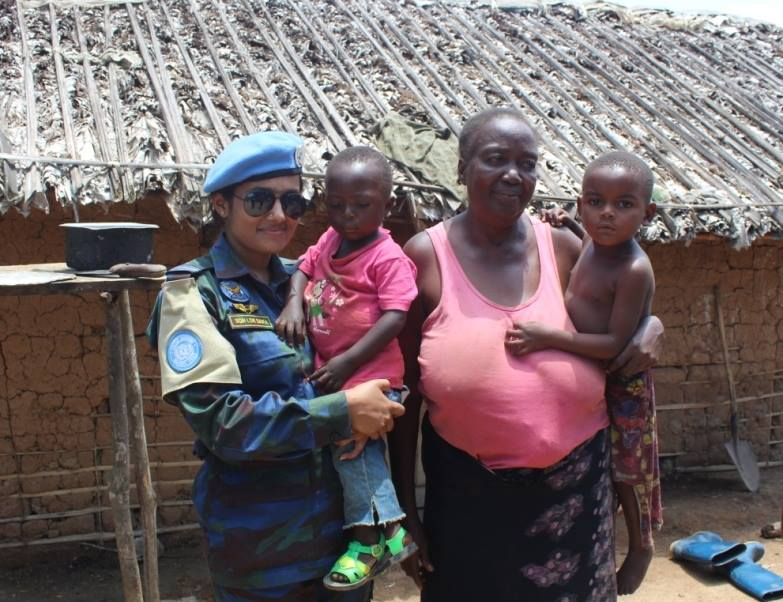
BANAIR-13 with Congo Pygmies at Mambasa, Democratic Republic Congo.

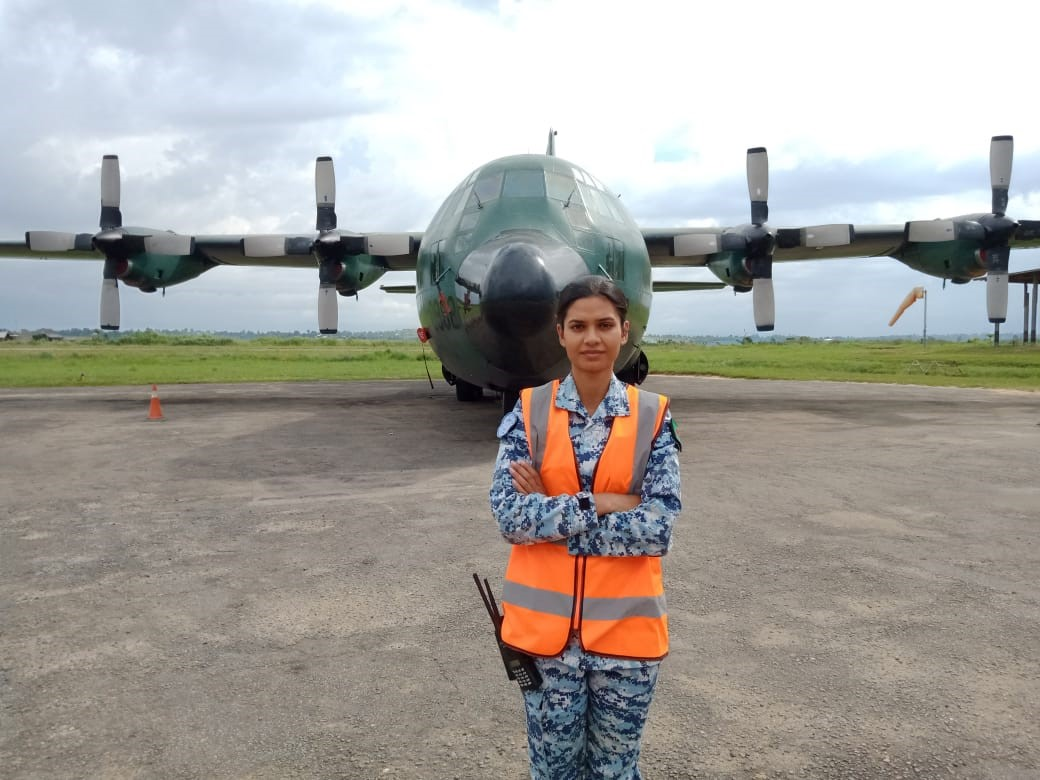
Emergency Crash and Rescue Section of MONUSCO Force, in Bunia, Ituri

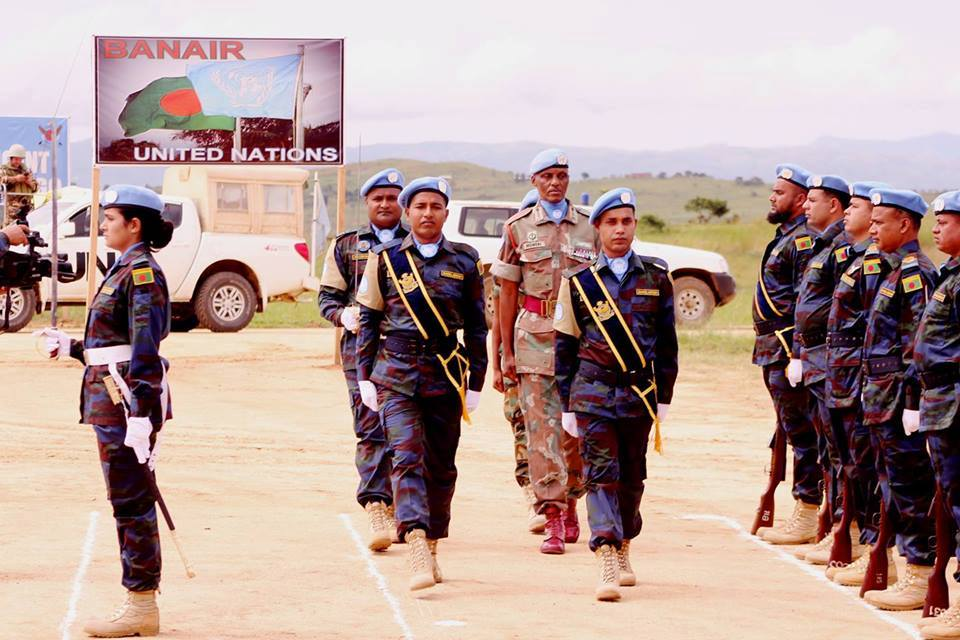
Guard of Honour during UN Medal Awarding Parade at Bunia, Congo.

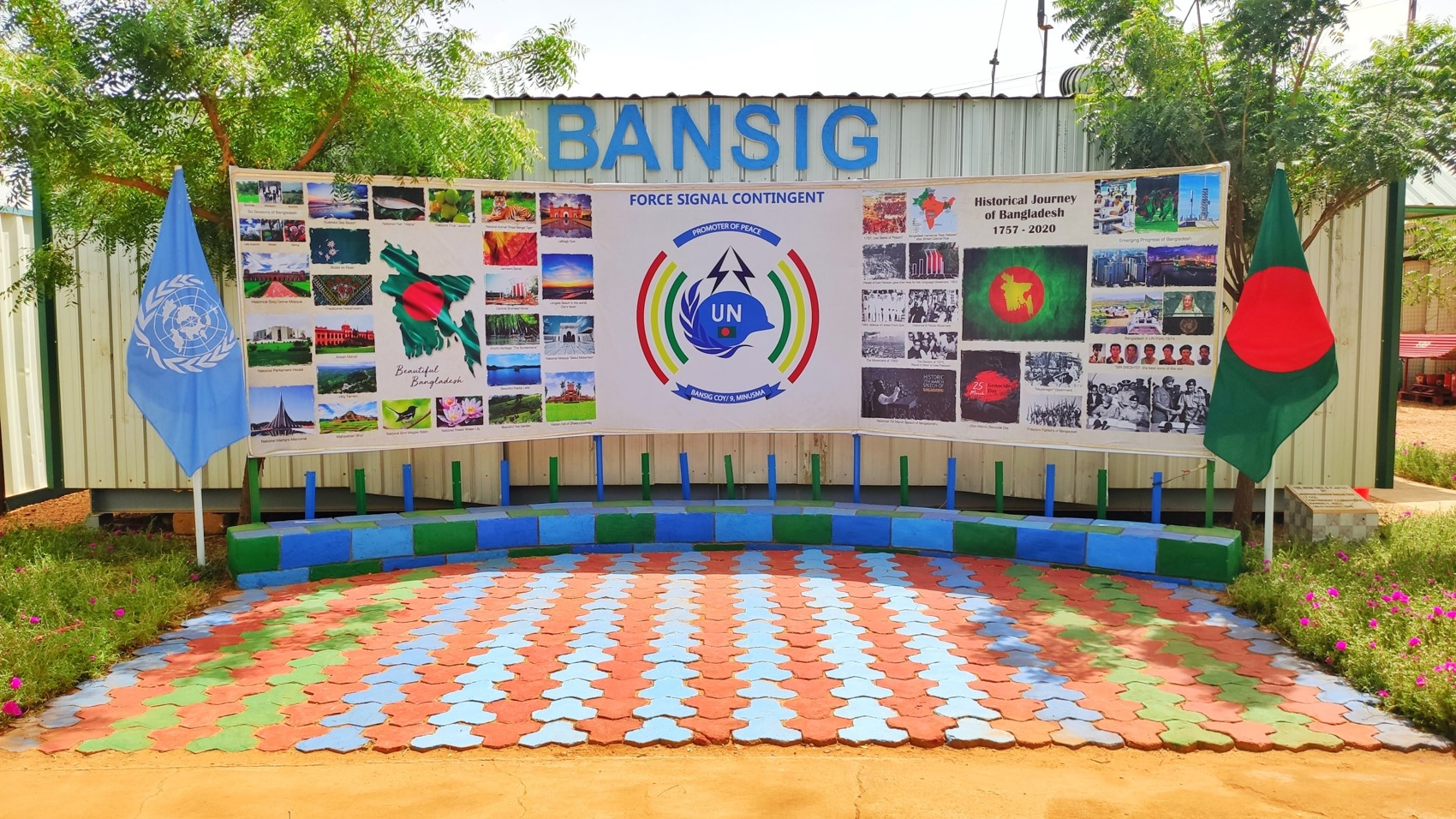
BANSIG contingent at GAO, Mali under MINUSMA

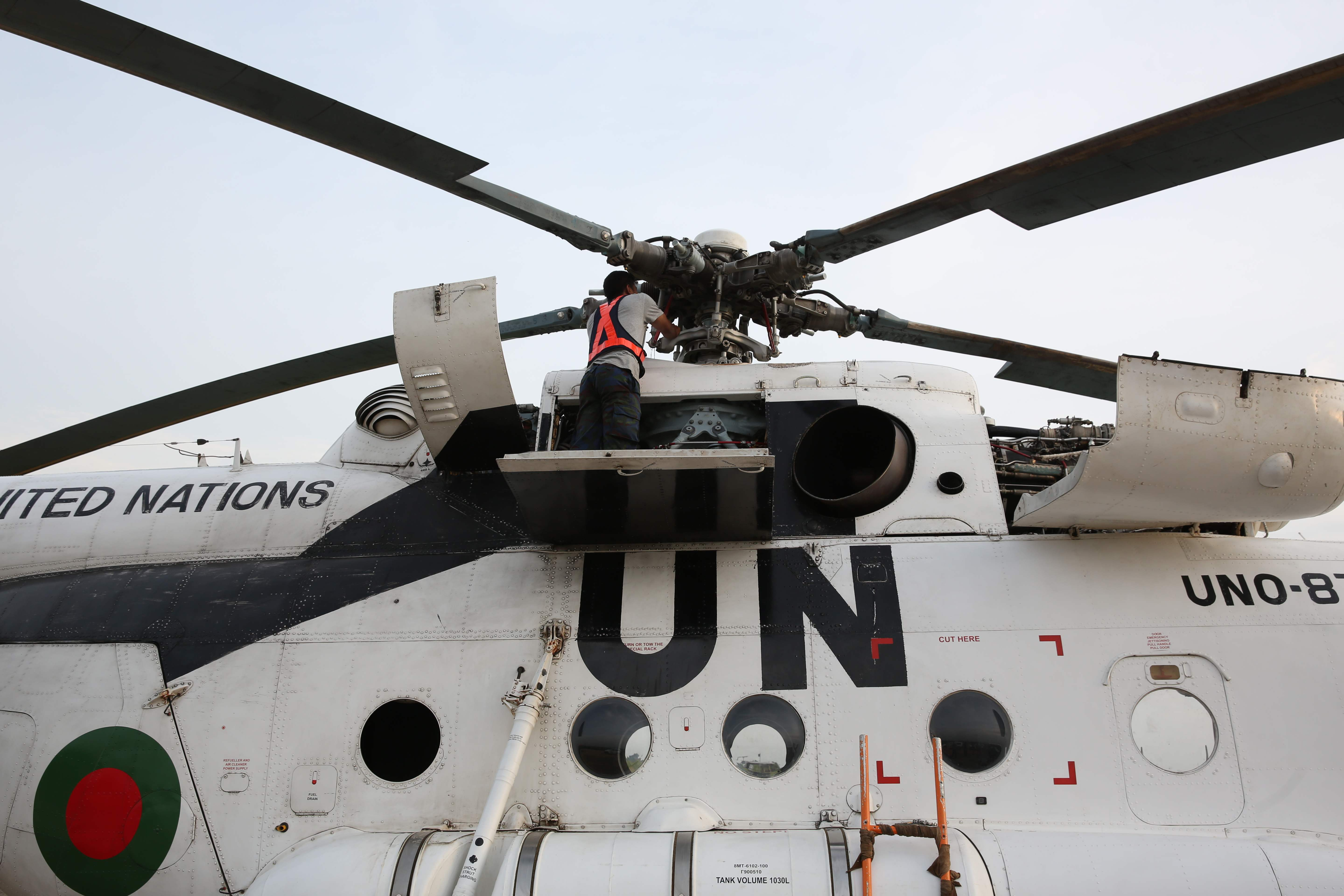
A technician maintains a Bangladeshi Mi-17 helicopter at the MONUSCO base in Bunia, DR Congo

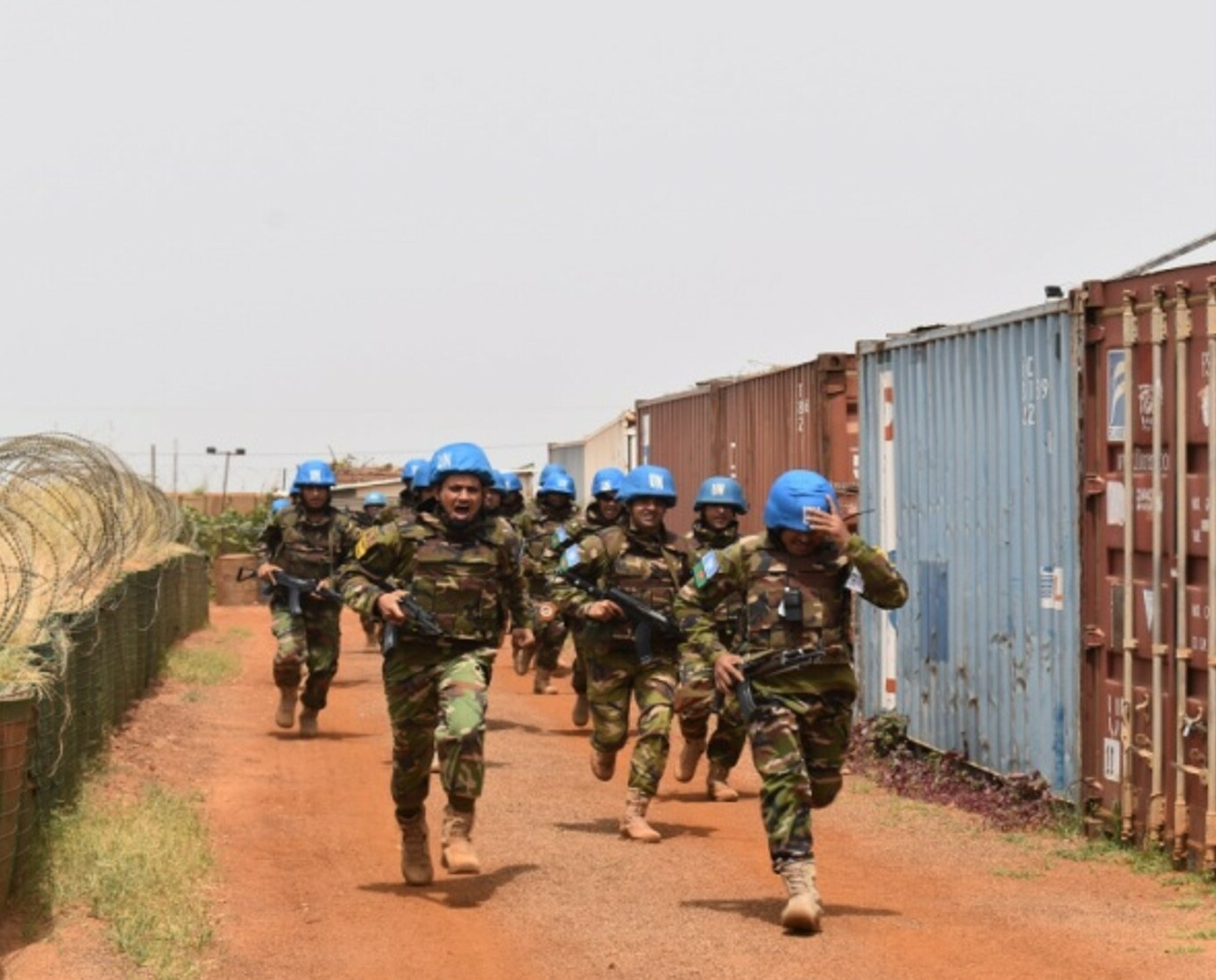
Bangladesh forces under MINUSMA Mali

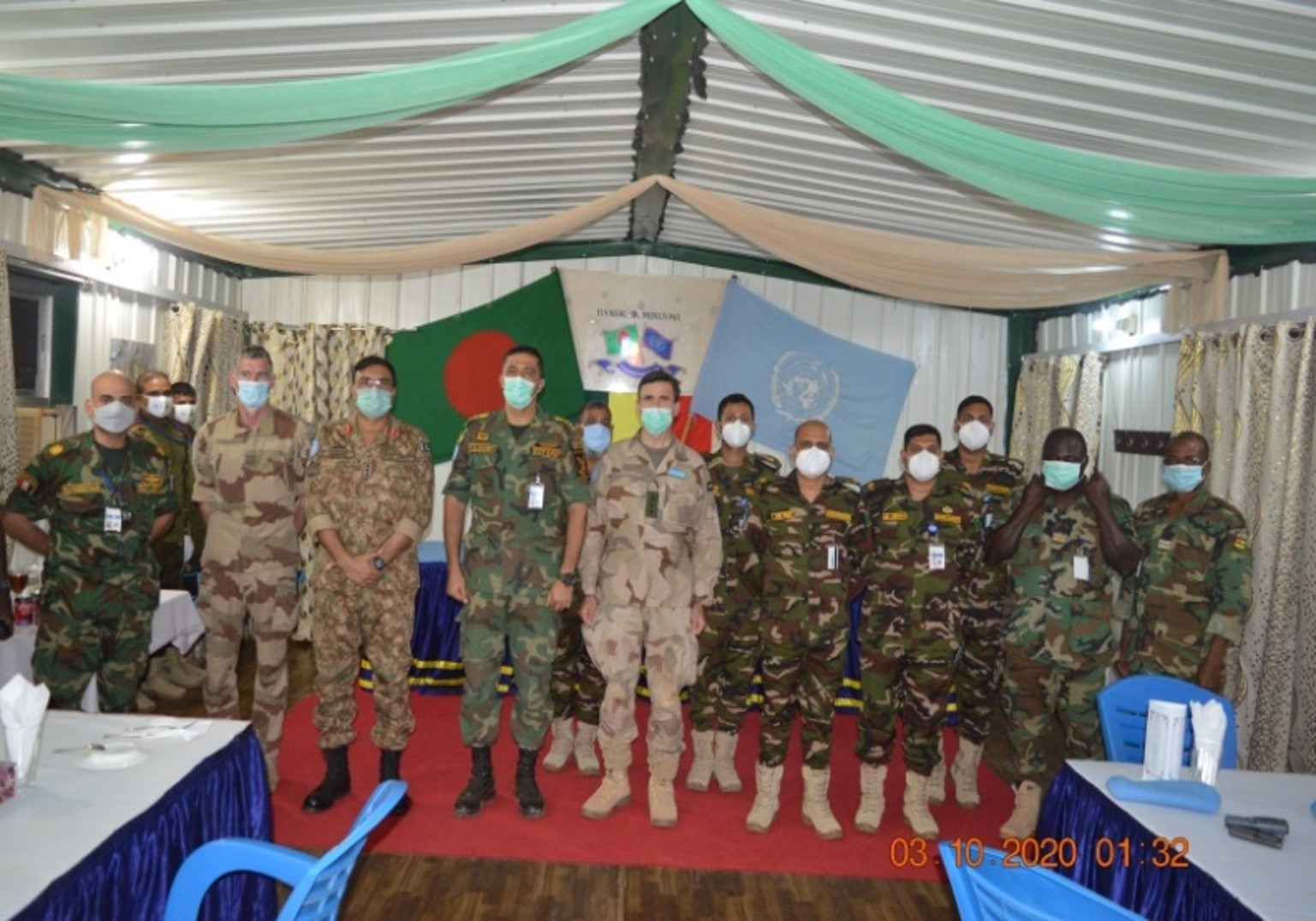
MINUSMA commanders with Bangladeshi peacekeepers of the BANSIG Contingent
