= M. Abdul Hafiz =

Abdul Hafiz (1935 – 2019) was a Bangladeshi military officer who retired as a brigadier general, and later became known as a columnist and analyst of international security and national defence. He was the former Director General of the Bangladesh Institute of International and Strategic Studies.

== Early life and education ==
Abdul Hafiz was born in 1935 in Rangpur District, Bengal Presidency, British India. He spent his early years in Bogura. He later joined the Pakistan Military Academy, from which he graduated in 1960.

== Career ==
Hafiz served in the Pakistan Army before the Independence of Bangladesh and continued his service in the Bangladesh Army after 1971. Over the course of his career, he held various command and staff appointments and eventually rose to the rank of brigadier general. He retired from active military service in 1988.

Following his retirement from the army, Hafiz was appointed director general of the Bangladesh Institute of International and Strategic Studies, a position he held for ten years from 1982 to 1992. He wrote newspaper columns on regional geopolitics and defence issues. He later served in the board of governors of the Bangladesh Institute of International and Strategic Studies.

== Death ==
Hafiz died on 18 April 2019.
