= Abu Ahmed Zahirul Amin Khan =

Bangladeshi General (1944 – 2024)

- আবু আহমেদ জহিরুল আমিন খান
- Born: 11 May 1944; Mirsharai, Bengal, British India
- Died: 1 May 2024 (aged 79); Gulshan, Dhaka, Bangladesh
- Military career
- Allegiance: Bangladesh; Pakistan (before 1973)
- Branch: Bangladesh Army; Pakistan Army
- Service years: 1967 – 1997
- Rank: Major General
- Nickname: ZA Khan
- Unit: East Bengal Regiment
- Commands: Director General of Bangladesh Institute of International and Strategic Studies; Director General of Directorate General of Defence Purchase; Chairman of Sena Kalyan Sangstha; Station Commander, Chittagong
- Conflicts: Chittagong Hill Tracts Conflict

Abu Ahmed Zahirul Amin Khan (11 May 1944 – 1 May 2024), known as ZA Khan, was a major general of the Bangladesh Army. From 2001 to 2006, he served as defense advisor to Prime Minister Khaleda Zia at the rank of minister.

== Career ==
ZA Khan was born on 11 May 1944 in Mirsrai, Chittagong. He joined the army in 1967. He retired from the Bangladesh Army in 1997.

He was the chairman of Bangladesh Red Crescent Society from 2001 to 2004 and director general of Bangladesh Institute of International and Strategic Studies (BIISS) in 1996.

Joined Bangladesh Nationalist Party in 1997. He was defense advisor to Prime Minister Khaleda Zia from 2001 to 2006.

He died on May 1, 2024, at his home in Gulshan. He is buried in Banani Military Cemetery.
