= Mohammad Ismail (academic) =

Bangladeshi academic and administrator

- মুহাম্মদ ইসমাইল

Vice-Chancellor of Noakhali Science and Technology University
- In office 6 September 2024 – 14 May 2026
- Preceded by: Md. Didar-ul-Alam

Personal details
- Born: 1 November 1978 (age 47) Chittagong, Bangladesh
- Education: University of Dhaka (BSc, MSc); University of Cambridge (PhD)
- Occupation: academic, University Administrator

Mohammad Ismail (born 1 November 1978) is a Bangladeshi academic. He is a professor in the Department of Applied Chemistry and Chemical Engineering at the University of Dhaka and currently serves as the Vice-Chancellor of Noakhali Science and Technology University (NSTU).

== Early life and education ==
Ismail was born on 1 November 1978 in Chittagong, Bangladesh. He completed his Secondary School Certificate (SSC) in 1994 from Kalauzan Dr. Yakub Bazlur Rahman Sikder High School and his Higher Secondary Certificate (HSC) in 1996 from Chittagong College.

Ismail went on to study at the University of Dhaka, where he earned a bachelor's degree in applied chemistry and chemical technology in 2001, graduating second in his class with first-class honors. He completed his master's degree in the same discipline in 2002, securing first position in first class. In 2016, he earned a PhD from the University of Cambridge, UK.

== Career ==
Mohammad Ismail began his professional career as a scientific officer at the Bangladesh Council of Scientific and Industrial Research (BCSIR), where he worked from 2006 to 2008. Although selected for the Bangladesh Civil Service (BCS) Administration Cadre in 2008, he chose to pursue academia and joined the University of Dhaka as a lecturer in the Department of Applied Chemistry and Chemical Engineering. He was promoted to assistant professor in 2010, associate professor in 2018, and full professor in 2023.

In addition to his role at the University of Dhaka, Ismail has taught at several other institutions, including the Bangladesh Petroleum Institute, Independent University Bangladesh (IUB), East West University, United International University (UIU), and Daffodil International University. He has also served as a consultant for various national and international organizations.

On 5 September 2024, Ismail was appointed as the Vice-Chancellor of Noakhali Science and Technology University and assumed office on 6 September 2024. He served the NSTU till 14th May, 2026 and then returned to University of Dhaka., https://www.tbsnews.net/bangladesh/education/govt-appoints-new-vcs-11-public-universities-1439556

== Research and publications ==
Ismail has published over Sixty research papers in both national and international peer-reviewed journals. He has also served as a reviewer for several academic journals.
