= Ismail Faruque Chowdhury =

Bangladeshi military engineer

- Born: 25 July 1953 (age 73); Maulvibazar, East Bengal, Pakistan
- Education: Dhaka College; Bangladesh University of Engineering and Technology
- Military career
- Allegiance: Bangladesh
- Branch: Bangladesh Army
- Service years: 1977–2008
- Rank: Major General
- Unit: Corps of Engineers
- Commands: Commander of 14th Independent Engineers Brigade; Station Commander, Qadirabad; Commander of 24th Engineers Construction Brigade; Commandant of Military Institute of Science and Technology; ENC of Army Headquarters
- Conflicts: UNTAET

Major General Md. Ismail Faruque Chowdhury (born 25 July 1953) is a former engineer-in-chief of the Bangladesh Army.

== Early life and education ==
Chowdhury was born on 25 July 1953 in the Maulvibazar District of what is now Bangladesh. He passed his HSC examination from Dhaka College in the year 1970. During service in the army, he completed his bachelor's and master's degrees in civil engineering from Bangladesh University of Engineering and Technology in Dhaka.

== Career ==
Chowdhury was commissioned in the Corps of Engineers of the Bangladesh Army on 25 December 1977 after completing his training at the Bangladesh Military Academy. He served in the UN peacekeeping force UNTAET in East Timor as commander of the Bangladesh Engineer Battalion from March 2000 to March 2001. He commanded an Independent Engineer Brigade in Dhaka. He was the 4th commandant of the Military Institute of Science and Technology in Mirpur Cantonment, Dhaka, Bangladesh. In February 2006, he was appointed as engineer-in-chief (E-in-C) of the Bangladesh Army. As E-in-C, he was also the head of the Military Engineer Services (MES) of the Bangladesh Armed Forces. Maj Gen Ismail Faruque was a participant of the Senior International Defence Management Course (SIDMC)-2006 at the Defense Resource Management Institute (DRMI), Naval Postgraduate School (NPS), Monterey, California. After attaining 55 years of age he qualified for obtaining normal retirement from military service and proceeded on leave preparatory to retirement (LPR) on 24 July 2008. Thereafter in June 2009 he joined on contract service with Mirpur Ceramic Works Ltd and Khadim Ceramics Ltd as executive director and continued till July 2021. Thereafter he was appointed as advisor to the chairman and vice chairman of Mirpur Ceramic Group and is continuing in this position.
