= Rajendrapur Cantonment =

Bangladeshi military cantonment

Rajendrapur Cantonment
- Gazipur, Dhaka, Bangladesh

Site information
- Type: Cantonment
- Controlled by: Bangladesh Army

Rajendrapur Cantonment is a cantonment of the Bangladesh Army located in Gazipur, Dhaka Division, Bangladesh.

== Installations ==
Units under Logistics Area

- Station Headquarters, Rajendrapur
  - Combined Military Hospital
  - Static Signals Company, Rajendrapur
- Central Ordnance Depot

Units under ARTDOC

- Ordnance Centre and School
- Bangladesh Institute of Peace Support Operation Training (BIPSOT)
- Ministry of Defence Constabulary (MODC)

== Education ==
- Rajendrapur Cantonment Public School and College
