= Rashidul Alam =

Bangladeshi military officer (born 1970)

- Military career
- Allegiance: Bangladesh
- Branch: Bangladesh Army
- Rank: Brigadier

Rashidul Alam is a Bangladesh Army Brigadier General and former commanding officer of Rapid Action Battalion-1.

== Early life ==
Alam was born on 23 Nov 1970 in Bogra District, East Pakistan, Pakistan. He graduated from Bangladesh Military Academy. He completed his MBA at the American International University-Bangladesh.

== Career ==
Alam was commissioned on 22 Jan 1990 in Bangladesh Army. He served in various peacekeeping operations of the United Nations.

Alam served as the commanding officer of Rapid Action Battalion-1 from 2009 to 2013. In June 2010, a suspected extortionist who had impersonated a Detective Branch officer reportedly died by suicide while in custody at Rapid Action Battalion-1 headquarters in Uttara. In August 2010, his unit arrested six individuals during a raid in Demra, two of whom were shot in an exchange of fire. In January 2012, his unit detained five people associated with the banned Hizb-ut-Tahrir-Bangladesh who had bought out a procession in Uttara.

Alam served as the Deputy Director General (Logistics) of the Border Guard Bangladesh. He was a director of Shimanto Bank.

In January 2026, Alam was mentioned in a report by a Commission of Inquiry on Enforced Disappearances, which investigated allegations involving members of security forces in Bangladesh. According to the report, Alam provided testimony describing an orientation session conducted by Major General Ziaul Ahsan, during which two individuals were allegedly shot. He also gave details to an internal Bangladesh Army inquiry board regarding alleged incidents linked to enforced disappearances. According to the Commission of Inquiry, Alam said he submitted a written statement and gave details regarding alleged involvement of senior officers in the disappearance of BNP leader Ilias Ali.
