= Ibne Fazal Shayekhuzzaman =

Bangladesh Army Officer

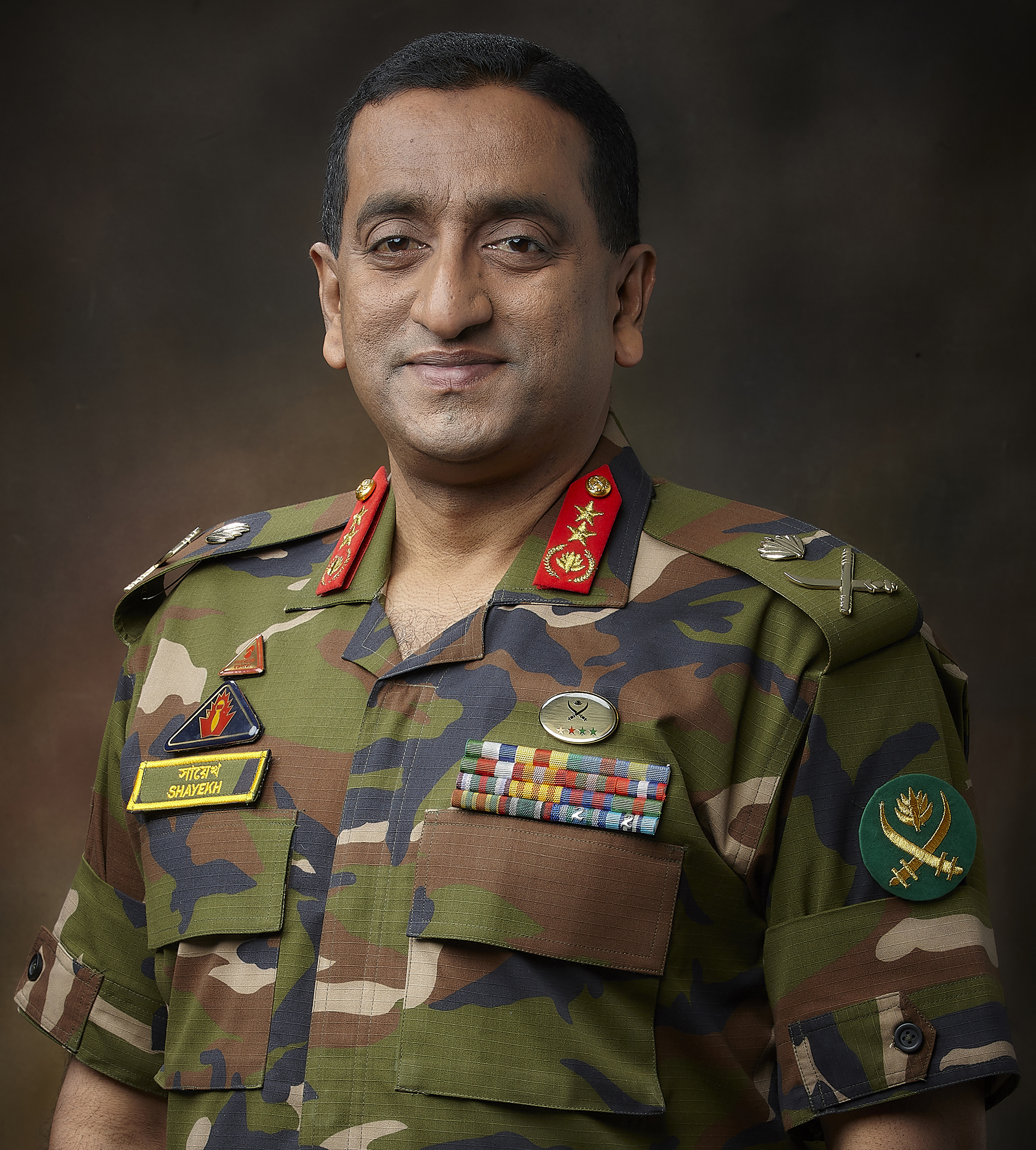
- Major General Shayekhuzzaman
- Born: 31 December 1966 (age 59)
- Military career
- Allegiance: Bangladesh
- Branch: Bangladesh Army
- Service years: 1987–2022
- Rank: Major General
- Unit: Corps of Engineers
- Commands: Commandant of Defence Services Command and Staff College; ENC of Army Headquarters; GOC of 11th Infantry Division; Director General of National Telecommunication Monitoring Centre; Commander of 14th Independent Engineers Brigade; Station Commander, Ghatail
- Conflicts: Gulf War
- Awards: Sena Gourab Padak(SGP); Bishishto Seba Padak (BSP)

Ibne Fazal Shayekhuzzaman is a retired major general of the Bangladesh Army, a former engineer-in-chief of the Bangladesh Army, and former commandant of the Defence Services Command and Staff College (DSCSC).

== Career ==
Shayekhuzzaman was commissioned in the 16th long course of the Bangladesh Military Academy in 1987. He graduated from Bangladesh University of Engineering and Technology, where he majored in civil engineering. He worked as an instructor in the School of Infantry and Tactics. He served in the first Gulf War as part of the Bangladesh detachment in the United States-led coalition. He was the rescue co-ordinator following the collapse of Rana Plaza.

Shayekhuzzaman served as general officer commanding of an infantry division. He also served as the colonel staff of the 9th Infantry Division. He headed the Foreign Affairs and Protocol department of the Armed Forces Division. He was the founding director of the National Telecommunication Monitoring Centre. On 17 February 2019, he was appointed the engineer-in-chief of the Bangladesh Army. He served as the E in C for three years until 17 February 2022. After that, he was posted as the commandant of the Defence Services Command and Staff College (DSCSC), where he is currently serving. He was a trustee of the Bangladesh Army International University of Science and Technology. He was also the chairman of Proyash Central Board of Directors.

== Personal life ==
Shayekhuzzaman is married to Tanjina Sattar and is the father of a daughter and a son.
