= Ziaul Ahsan =

Bangladeshi military officer

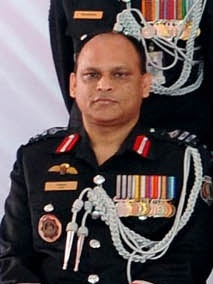
- Ahsan in 2015
- Military career
- Allegiance: Bangladesh
- Branch: Bangladesh Army
- Service years: 1991 – 2024
- Rank: Major General
- Service number: BA - 4060
- Unit: East Bengal Regiment
- Commands: Director General of National Telecommunication Monitoring Centre; Additional Director General (Operations) of RAB; Director (Internal Affairs) of NSI; Director of Intelligence Wing of the Rapid Action Battalion
- Awards: Bishishto Seba Padak; Maroon Parachute Wing
- Police career
- Unit: Rapid Action Battalion
- Allegiance: Bangladesh
- Branch: Bangladesh Police
- Service years: 2009–2016
- Rank: Additional Director General
- Awards: BPM (bar); PPM (bar)

Ziaul Ahsan is a former two-star major general of the Bangladesh Army and the antecedent director general of the National Telecommunication Monitoring Centre. Ahsan is known for his alleged extrajudicial and enforced disappearance assignments while tenuring at Rapid Action Battalion under the regime of Prime Minister Sheikh Hasina. He was relieved of his duties and detained forthwith after the Student–People's uprising. The Daily Amar Desh and Mohammad Tajul Islam alleged that he killed a total of 1,030 enforced disappeared persons during his career at the order of Sheikh Hasina.

== Early life and education ==
Ahsan graduated from the Bangladesh Military Academy's 24th long course. He was commissioned on 21 June 1991. He trained as a commando and skydiver.

== Military career ==
Ahsan joined the Rapid Action Battalion on 5 March 2009 as the company commander for the second battalion. He was elevated to the rank of lieutenant colonel the same year and took charge as director of the RAB's intelligence wing on 27 August 2010. He was made the RAB's additional director general (operations) on 7 December 2013 after being promoted to colonel. He was promoted to brigadier general in 2015.

Ahsan led a number of operations over his seven-and-a-half years with RAB. He played a role in the repatriation of Nur Hossain, main accused in the Narayanganj Seven Murder case from Kolkata. RAB colleagues said that Ahsan played a crucial role in arresting leaders of extremist organizations Jamaat-ul-Mujahideen Bangladesh, Harkat-ul-Jihad-al-Islami, and the Ansarullah Bangla Team along with others, including Sohel Rana and drug kingpin Amin Huda.

He was awarded the Bangladesh Police Medal (BPM) in 2010 and the President Police Medal (PPM) in 2011.

Ahsan left the Rapid Action Battalion in April 2016 to become the director of internal affairs at the National Security Intelligence.

== Controversies and prosecution ==
Ahsan has faced multiple allegations of involvement in extrajudicial killings and enforced disappearances while serving in the Rapid Action Battalion (RAB) and the National Security Intelligence (NSI). Brigadier General Rashidul Alam has testified that he had seen Ahsan execute two individuals who were in custody of the RAB.

On 29 April 2014, while serving as the commanding officer of RAB-11, Ahsan allegedly ordered Lieutenant Colonel Tareque Sayeed and Major Arif Hossain to abduct and kill Narayanganj City Corporation councilor Nazrul Islam, which led to the Seven Murders of the Narayanganj. In a confessional statement, Major Arif claimed he had acted on Ahsan's orders. Ahsan has denied any involvement.

Following the Student–People's uprising and the ouster of Prime Minister Sheikh Hasina, Ahsan was detained at Hazrat Shahjalal International Airport on 6 August 2024 while attempting to leave the country. He was subsequently dismissed from the army and taken into custody. On 16 August, a Dhaka court placed him on an eight-day remand for interrogation in connection with the death of a shopkeeper during protests in the capital's New Market area on 16 July 2024.

On 29 August 2024, a Dhaka court issued an arrest warrant against Ahsan and four other former senior intelligence officials in a case involving the alleged abduction and enforced disappearance of brigadier general Abdullahil Amaan Azmi.

In October 2024, The Daily Star published detailed accounts from former RAB officers who alleged that Ahsan personally directed, and at times was present during, numerous acts of extrajudicial killings and torture. The officers described a secretive unit that operated under his command to carry out these operations.

== Personal life ==
Ahsan's home in Barisal was vandalized and burned down on 19 November 2026.
