= Hasnat Abdul Hye =

Bangladeshi writer and novelist

- হাসনাত আব্দুল হাই
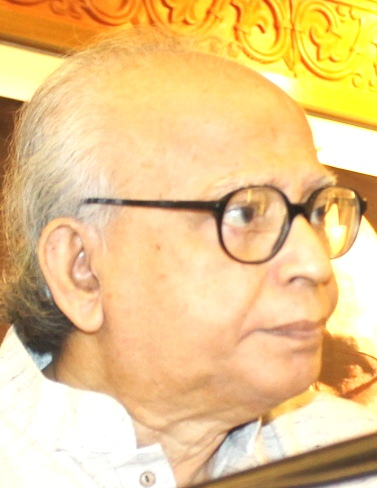
- Hye in 2016
- Born: c. 1939; Calcutta, Bengal Presidency, British India
- Education: Cambridge University
- Occupations: Writer, novelist
- Awards: full list

Hasnat Abdul Hye (born c. 1939) (Note: Sources disagree regarding his date of birth. Samakal says 17 May 1937. The Daily Star and The Financial Express say 19 May 1937. According to the Bangla Academy Dictionary of Writers, however, he was born on 4 September 1939. His publisher, The University Press Limited, also says 1939.) is a Bangladeshi writer and novelist. He was awarded Ekushey Padak by the government of Bangladesh in 1994. As of 2017, he has 70 published works in both Bengali and English.

== Early life and education ==
Hye was born in Calcutta. His ancestral home is Kasba, Brahmanbaria. His father is Abul Fateh, and his mother is Ayesha Siddik. He had eight siblings. He studied economics at the University of Dhaka, the University of Washington, and the London School of Economics, and development studies at Cambridge University.

== Career ==
Hye taught economics at the University of Dhaka for two years before joining the Civil Service of Pakistan in 1965. He retired as a full secretary of the Bangladesh government in 2000.

== Works ==
Hye wrote his first short story, "Carnival", in 1960. His first travelogue is titled Manhattan and Ten Dollars. In 1995, he wrote Novera, a novel based on the life story of the sculptor Novera Ahmed. In 2017, the book was adapted to a stage monodrama, acted by Samiun Jahan Dola.

In 2008, he published Boyhood in British India and Pakistan, a collection of autobiographical columns that appeared in Daily News under the banner Aide Memoire. This covers a period from 1943 to 1954.

=== "TV Camerar Samne Meyeti" ===
On 14 April 2013, Hye published a short story titled "TV Camerar Samne Meyeti" (The Girl In Front Of The TV Camera) in the daily newspaper Prothom Alo. The store centers around a politically active girl, Seema, leading the slogan shouting brigade who is sexually exploited by a senior politician, the man who recruits her. The story suggested her popularity stemmed from her sexual free-mixing with males. The publication angered readers, and amid protests, Prothom Alo issued an apology and retracted the story. Few days later, M Wahiduzzaman, a professor at the University of Dhaka, filed a petition with the High Court as a public interest litigation saying the story written by Hye "is provocative and insulting to the women of the society". The High Court later rejected the writ petition.

=== Books ===
- Shuprobhat, Bhalobasha (Good morning, Love) (1977)
- My Assassin (1980)
- The Whale (1981)
- The Great Man (1982)
- Crown Prince (1985)
- The Master (1986)
- Sultan (1991)
- Time (1991)
- News from Morelganj (1995)
- One Aroj Ali (1995)
- Novera (1995)
- One Waiting Outside (1995)
- Hasan, of Late (1995)
- Swallow (1996)
- Interview (1997)
- Xanadu: A Journey (1999)
- Shantaru O Jalkanya (The Swimmer and the Mermaid)
- Indur Dour (Rat Race)
- Baishakhe Virginia Woolf (Virginia Woolf in the Summer)
- Shaat Diner America (America in Seven Days)
- Palli Unnayan (Rural Development)
- Portrait of a Writer (2008)
- Boyhood in British India and Pakistan (2008)
- From The Horse's Mouth 1965-2000: Memoir Of A Bureaucrat In Pakistan And Bangladesh (2015)

== Awards ==
- Bangla Academy Literary Award (1977)
- Alakta Literary Prize (1993)
- Ekushey Padak (1994)
- Jagadish Chandra Basu Prize (1995)
- Sher-e-Bangla Prize (1995)
- S.M. Sultan Prize (1995)
- Shilpacharya Zainul Prize (1996)

== Personal life ==
Hye was married to Nasreen Hye (d. 2012). Together they had a son and a daughter.
