= Secondary Education Quality and Access Enhancement Project =

Education project in Bangladesh

SEQAEP (Secondary Education Quality and Access Enhancement Project)
- সেকায়েপ
- Founder: Dr. Md. Mahamud Ul Hauqe
- Country: Bangladesh
- Launched: July 2008
- Closed: December 2017

The Secondary Education Quality and Access Enhancement Project (SEQAEP) project is designed to enhance the quality of education at the secondary level in Bangladesh by facilitating access to information through quality teaching materials and audio-visual demo of classes to teachers and students. The goal is to bring the entire project upazillas into Internet accessibility to facilitate the performance of various activities of SEQAEP. The project worked with the Higher Education Quality Enhancement Project to develop education in Bangladesh with support from the World Bank.
