= Munshi Faiz Ahmed =

Bangladeshi diplomat

- মুন্সী ফয়েজ আহমেদ

Ambassador of Bangladesh to China
- In office 2007–2012
- Preceded by: Ashfaqur Rahman

High Commissioner of Bangladesh to Singapore
- In office 18 March 2003 – 5 September 2007
- Preceded by: Syed Maudud Ali
- Succeeded by: Kamrul Ahsan

Munshi Faiz Ahmed is a former Bangladeshi ambassador of Bangladesh to China and the former chairman of the Bangladesh Institute of International and Strategic Studies. He is the former High Commissioner of Bangladesh to Singapore.

== Career ==
Ahmed was the High Commissioner of Bangladesh to Singapore. He and the Minister of Foreign Affairs, M Morshed Khan, visited Nirmal Sengupta at the Mount Elizabeth Hospital in Singapore.

Ahmed served as the chairman of the Bangladesh Institute of International and Strategic Studies from 3 March 2013 to 2 March 2019. He is the chief of the Association of Bangladesh-China Alumni. In 2024, he called the boycott India campaign a "political stunt".

Ahmed has been critical of the proposed humanitarian corridor to Myanmar by the Muhammad Yunus-led interim government.
