= Md. Sharif Uddin =

Major general of Bangladesh Army

Md. Sharif Uddin is a major general of the Bangladesh Army and a politician of the Bangladesh Nationalist Party. He is the former director general of the Bangladesh Institute of International and Strategic Studies.

== Career ==
From 25 March 2007 to 3 July 2007, Uddin served as the Director General of the Bangladesh Institute of International and Strategic Studies.

Uddin is an advisor to the chairperson of the Bangladesh Nationalist Party, Khaleda Zia. In 2025, the Bangladesh Nationalist Party nominated Uddin for the Rajshahi-1 parliamentary seat.

== Personal life ==
Uddin's older brother is former cabinet minister Aminul Haque. His brother Dr. Enamul Huq was IGP of Bangladesh Police.
