= Mufleh R. Osmany =

Mufleh R. Osmany (Bengali: মুফলেহ আর ওসমানী) is a former foreign secretary of Bangladesh and diplomat. He is the president of Anjuman Mufidul Islam. He is a former Ambassador and Permanent Representative of Bangladesh to the United Nations Office in Geneva. He is a former High Commissioner of Bangladesh to Canada. His cousin, Muhammad Ataul Ghani Osmani, was the first chief of staff of the Bangladesh Army.

== Career ==
Osmany served as the principal of the Foreign Service Academy from 1983 to 1984.

Osmany served as the Ambassador and Permanent Representative of Bangladesh to the United Nations and other Offices in Geneva in 1991 and 1992.

From 13 December 1993 to 9 February 1995, Osmany served as the foreign secretary of Bangladesh in the Ministry of Foreign Affairs.

In 2006, Osmany edited Religious militancy and security in South Asia with Shaheen Afroze. He was the chairman of the board of governors of Bangladesh Institute of International and Strategic Studies from 2003 to 2008. He wrote Global War on Terror: Bangladesh Perspective with Mohammad Humayun Kabir in 2007.

In 2008, Osmany edited the Whither national security, Bangladesh while working at Bangladesh Institute of International and Strategic Studies. He also published Democracy, Governance, and Security Reforms in 2008.

Osmany is an advisor of Ibrahim Cardiac Hospital and Research Institute. He is a professor and the Dr. Rashid Chair at Bangladesh University of Engineering and Technology. He is a member of Gulshan Society.
