= Bangladesh Institute of International and Strategic Studies =

Research institute in Bangladesh

- Formation: 1978
- Headquarters: 1/46, Old Elephant Road, Ramna, Dhaka, Bangladesh
- Region served: Bangladesh
- Official language: Bengali
- Director General: Major General A. S. M. Ridwanur Rahman
- Parent organization: Foreign Ministry of Bangladesh
- Website: www.biiss.org

Bangladesh Institute of International and Strategic Studies (BIISS) is a state-owned research institute and think tank that carries out research on security and strategic issues in Bangladesh. It is located in Dhaka, Bangladesh. Major General A. S. M. Ridwanur Rahman is the current Director General and Ambassador A F M Gousal Azam Sarker is the current Chairman of BIISS.

== History ==
The institute was established in 1978 by the Government of Bangladesh as a statutory organisation. The institute is under the Ministry of Foreign Affairs.

== Director generals ==
Name	Rank	Time Period	End date	Reference
Abu Belal Muhammad Shafiul Huq	Major General	15-10-2008 to 18-03-2009	2009-03-18	
Jiban Kanai Das	Major General	29-01-2008 to 27-04-2008	2008-04-27	
Md. Sharif Uddin	Major General	25-03-2007 to 03-07-2007	2007-07-03	
A N M Muniruzzaman	Major General	18-07-2006 to 28-02-2007	2007-02-28	
Muhammad Abdul Matin	Major General	19-03-2004 to 01-05-2006	2006-05-01	
Md. Abdul Mubeen	Major General	03-02-2003 to 18-03-2004	2004-03-18	
Sikder Md. Shahabuddin	Major General	11-11-2001 to 05-01-2003	2003-01-05	
A M Mansur Ahmed	Major General	17-08-2001 to 10-11-2001	2001-11-10	
Jamil D Ahsan	Major General	07-03-2000 to 13-08-2001	2001-08-13	
Shahedul Anam Khan	Brigadier General	06-02-1997 to 02-03-2000	2000-03-02	
A A Z Amin Khan	Major General	08-09-1996 to 07-01-1997	1997-01-07	
S M Ibrahim	Major General	08-06-1996 to 15-06-1996	1996-06-15	
A K Fazlul Kabir	Major General	18-01-1996 to 07-06-1996	1996-06-07	
Ghulam Quader	Major General	26-12-1993 to 17-01-1996	1996-01-17	
Mustafa Kamal Uddin	Brigadier General	01-11-1992 to 25-12-1993	1993-12-25	
M. Afsarul Quader	Dr.	23-05-1992 to 31-10-1992	1992-10-31	
M. Abdul Hafiz	Brigadier General	26-08-1982 to 23-05-1992	1992-05-23	
A. H. M. Abdul Momen	Brigadier General	August 1982 to 25-08-1982	1982-08-25	

== Chairmen ==
Name	Position	Time Period	End date	Reference
Kazi Imtiaz Hossain	Ambassador	25-11-2021 to 31-12-2022	2022-12-31	
Munshi Faiz Ahmad	Ambassador	03-03-2013 to 02-03-2019	2019-03-02	
Muhammed Firdaus Mian	Major General	06-07-2009 to 27-07-2011	2011-07-27	
Syed Fatemy Ahmed Roomy	Major General	26-02-2009 to 12-03-2009	2009-03-12	
Mufleh R. Osmany	Ambassador	08-12-2001 to 30-10-2008	2008-10-30	
C. M. Shafi Sami	Ambassador	01-07-2001 to 30-11-2001	2001-11-30	
Mustafa Kamal Uddin	Major General	28-10-1997 to 31-12-2000	2000-12-31	
A. K. H. Morshed	Barrister	01-02-1990 to 31-01-1997	1997-01-31	
Muhammad Shamsul Huq	Professor	25-06-1978 to 31-01-1990	1990-01-31	
