= Engineer-in-Chief (Bangladesh army) =

Chief of the Army Engineer Corps

Engineer in Chief (E in C) is the chief engineering officer of Bangladesh Army and a technical advisor to the Chief of Army Staff on combat engineering and military works matters. Usually designated by a two star officer of the army, the engineer-in-chief oversees technical control on Corps of Engineers. The current Engineer in Chief of Bangladesh Army, 9 September 2024, is Major General Hasan Uz Zaman.

== List of Engineer-in-Chiefs ==
Sl.	Name	Term start	Term end	Reference
1	Major General Fazlur Rahman Al Mamun	17 November 1975	9 January 1978	
2	Major General M. A. Matin	10 January 1978	11 June 1981	
3	Major General Mozammel Hossain	19 July 1981	23 March 1982	
4	Major General Mahmudul Hasan	13 April 1982	6 July 1986	
5	Major General Muhammad Mahbubur Rahman	13 August 1986	3 April 1989	
6	Major General Mohammad A Halim	15 May 1989	30 May 1995	
7	Major General Mustafa Kamaluddin	30 May 1995	4 January 1996	
8	Major General Muhammad Mustafizur Rahman	4 January 1996	18 January 1996	
9	Major General Golam Kader	18 January 1996	18 June 1996	
10	Major General Abdul Hafiz Mallik	14 August 1996	24 February 2001	
11	Brigadier General Abdul Wadud	25 February 2001	16 November 2001	
12	Major General Tarique Ahmed Siddique	17 November 2001	17 March 2002	
13	Major General Abdul Wadud	26 August 2002	2 February 2006	
14	Major General Ismail Faruque Chowdhury	3 February 2006	24 July 2008	
15	Major General Nizam Ahmed	4 September 2008	14 May 2009	
16	Major General Hameed-Al-Hasan	14 May 2009	24 July 2011	
17	Major General Habibur Rahman Khan	24 July 2011	1 August 2013	
18	Major General Abul Hossain	1 August 2013	18 December 2013	
19	Major General Abdul Quadir	18 December 2013	29 September 2015	
20	Major General Siddiqur Rahman Sarker	29 September 2015	17 February 2019	
21	Major General Ibne Fazal Shayekhuzzaman	8 December 2019	17 February 2022	
22	Major General Jubayer Salehin	17 February 2022	21 September 2023	
23	Major General Iftekhar Anis	21 September 2023	12 September 2024	
24	Major General Hasan Uz Zaman	9 September 2024	present	
