= Higher Education Quality Enhancement Project =

Bangladeshi government programme

- Formation: 2009
- Headquarters: Dhaka, Bangladesh
- Region served: Bangladesh
- Official language: Bengali

Higher Education Quality Enhancement Project (Bengali: উচ্চ শিক্ষার গুণগত মান বৃদ্ধি প্রকল্প) was a Bangladesh government project, developed with support from the World Bank, to develop and improve Higher Education in Bangladesh. Higher Education Quality Enhancement Project and Secondary Education Quality and Access Enhancement Project were developed together to improve education in Bangladesh.

== History ==
On 24 October 2008, Executive Committee of the National Economic Council led by Chief Advisor of the Caretaker government, Fakhruddin Ahmed, approved Higher Education Quality Enhancement Project with the aim to provide research funding and grants to public and private universities.

Higher Education Quality Enhancement Project was started in 2009 and has been extended five times. On 8 March 2015, the Air Quality Research and Monitoring Centre was established at the University of Dhaka financed by the project. In July 2017, the project financed the building of a studio at the Department of Television, Film and Photography of the University of Dhaka.

The project was concluded on 31 December 2018. The project had spent US$238.1 million. It was implemented by University Grants Commission (Bangladesh). Higher Education Quality Enhancement Project created the Bangladesh Research and Education Network with the aim to digitalize higher education. The government is planning another higher education project called Higher Education Acceleration and Transformation.

Tanzimuddin Khan, International relations professor at University of Dhaka, criticized the project for being too focused on infrastructural developments and not administration and academic improvements.
