= A. N. M. Muniruzzaman (general) =

Bangladeshi general

A N M Muniruzzaman
- Military career
- Allegiance: Pakistan (before 1972); Bangladesh
- Branch: Pakistan Army; Bangladesh Army
- Service years: 1969 – 2006
- Rank: Major General
- Unit: Regiment of Artillery
- Commands: Commander of 19th Artillery Brigade; Commandant of Artillery Centre and School; Military Advisor to President; Commandant of BIPSOT; Director General of Bangladesh Institute of International and Strategic Studies
- Conflicts: UNTAC
- Awards: Independence Day Award

ANM Muniruzzaman is a retired major general of the Bangladesh Army, and president of the Bangladesh Institute of Peace & Security Studies. He is the chairperson of the Global Military Advisory Council on Climate Change. He was the director general of the Bangladesh Institute of International and Strategic Studies.

== Early life and education ==
Muniruzzaman graduated from the National University, Bangladesh, and National Defence College. He studied at the Asia Pacific Center for Security Studies, Malaysian Armed Forces Staff College, and the Naval War College.

== Career ==
Muniruzzaman was stuck in West Pakistan during the Bangladesh Liberation War in 1971 and was repatriated after the independence of Bangladesh. He received his commission in the artillery regiment.

Muniruzzaman was the military advisor to the president of Bangladesh. He had served in the United Nations Transitional Authority in Cambodia as the chief military liaison officer.

In 1999, Muniruzzaman worked for the establishment of the Bangladesh Institute of Peace Support Operations Training.

Muniruzzaman was appointed the director general of the Bangladesh Institute of International and Strategic Studies in 2005 to clear the path for Major General Moeen U Ahmed to become the next chief of army staff.

Muniruzzaman established the Bangladesh Institute of Peace and Security Studies in 2007. He jointly organized a round table in 2009 in Singapore with the Institute of South Asian Studies. In 2013, he testified in front of the United States House Committee on Foreign Affairs about Bangladesh. He raised concerns about increasing militant attacks on minorities in 2015 and had warned of prison radicalization. He has called for maintaining strategic ambiguity of Bangladesh when it comes to foreign relations.

On 22 January 2023, Muniruzzaman was elected chairman of the Global Military Advisory Council on Climate Change. He had spoken in front of the UN Security Council on climate change. In February 2024, he called for the fortification of the Bangladesh-Myanmar border. After the resignation of Prime Minister Sheikh Hasina, he called on India to engage with political parties in Bangladesh.
