= A. N. M. Muniruzzaman (statistician) =

Bangladeshi statistician

Abu Nasar Muhammad Muniruzzaman was a Bangladeshi statistician who was killed in the Bangladesh Liberation war and is considered a martyr in Bangladesh.

== Early life ==
Muniruzzaman was born in Kacherkol, Shailkupa, Jhenaidaha in 1924. He graduated from Narail SD High School in 1940 and in 1942 from Presidency College, Calcutta. He finished his BSc in statistics from Presidency College and his MSc, also in Statistics, from Calcutta University.

== Career ==
Muniruzzaman joined the Indian Statistical Institute in 1946 where he worked till 1948. After which he joined Dhaka University as a lecturer in the Department of Statistics. In 1961 he was promoted to reader and in 1967 to the chairman of the Department of Statistics.

== Death and legacy ==
On 25 March 1971, at the start of Operation Searchlight and Bangladesh Liberation war, the Pakistan Army attacked his residence. The army killed him, his older son, his nephew and also his brother. Bangladesh Post Office issued commemorative stamps with his name on 14 December 1991, the Martyred Intellectuals Day.
