= Bangladesh Institute of Peace & Security Studies =

Research institute in Bangladesh

- Formation: 2007
- Headquarters: Dhaka, Bangladesh
- Official language: Bengali
- Director General: A. N. M. Muniruzzaman
- Website: bipss.org.bd

Bangladesh Institute of Peace and Security Studies (BIPSS) is a non-party, non-profit organization and independent think tank devoted to studying peace and security issues related to South and Southeast Asia. The institute seeks to bridge the gap between academic research and policy analysis within the context of Bangladesh and other countries of South and Southeast Asia. Strategic thinkers, academicians, former members of the Civil Services, Foreign Services, Armed Forces and media persons are associated with the institute.

BIPSS is headed by Major General A. N. M. Muniruzzaman.

== Background ==
Bangladesh Institute of Peace and Security Studies was established in 2007 by Major General Muniruzzaman. BIPSS has launched a specialized front named Bangladesh Center for Terrorism Research (BCTR) focusing in depth research to curb extremism and militancy in Bangladesh and in South-Asia.

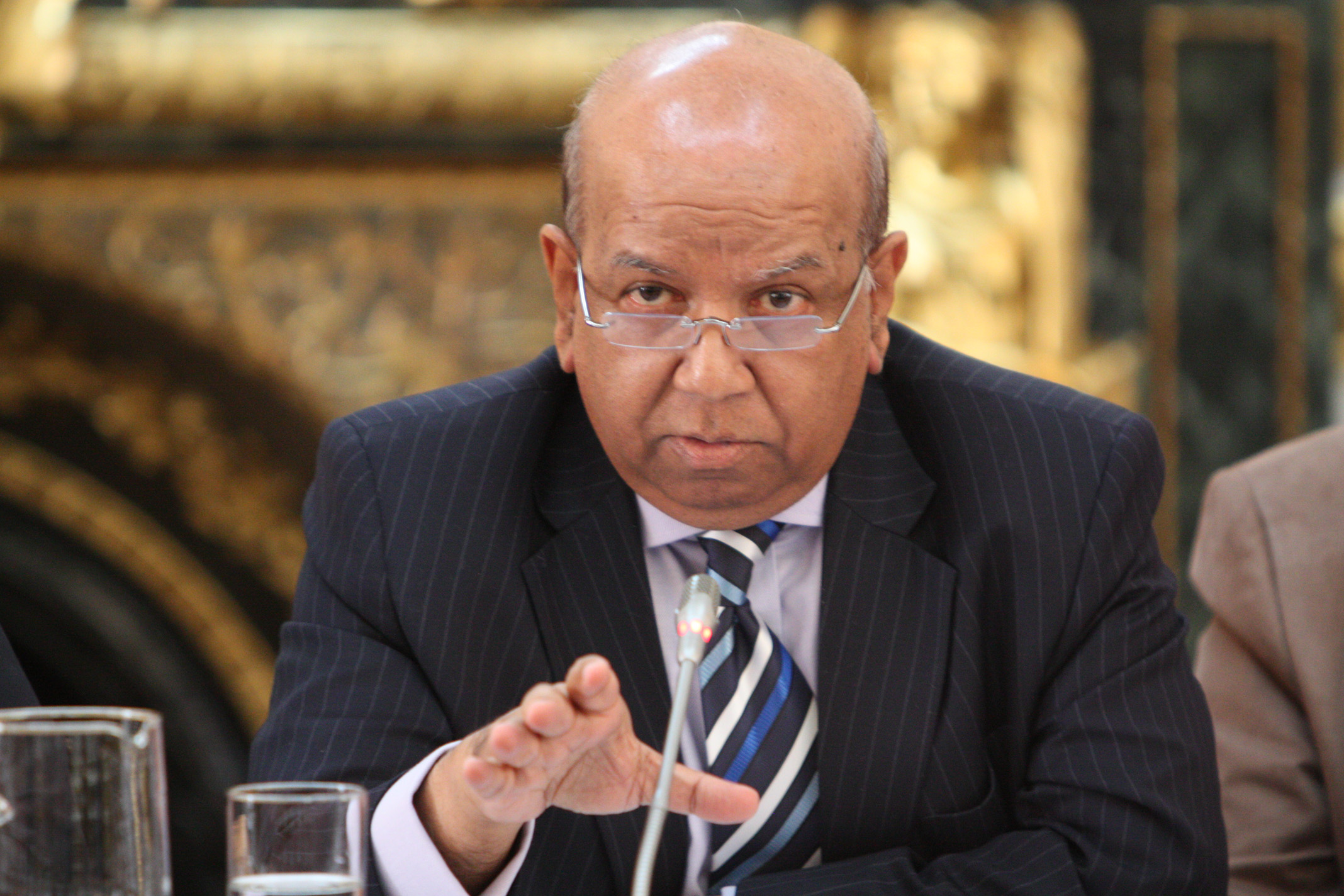
Muniruzzaman, president of the institute

== See also ==
- List of institutes in Bangladesh
