= Bangladesh Institute of Peace Support Operation Training =

- Formation: 1999
- Headquarters: Rajendrapur Cantonment, Dhaka Division, Bangladesh
- Region served: Bangladesh
- Official language: Bengali
- Commandant: Major General Masihur Rahman
- Website: Bangladesh Institute of Peace Support Operation Training

Bangladesh Institute of Peace Support Operation Training (BIPSOT) is a military institute that trains the Bangladeshi military and police personnel on United Nations peacekeeping missions. It is located in Rajendrapur Cantonment, Gazipur, Bangladesh. It also trains military personnel of friendly nations.

Currently the commandant of BIPSOT is Major General Hussain Muhammad Masihur Rahman.

== History ==
The institute was formed in June 1999 by the Sheikh Hasina led Awami League Government. In 2011, Ban Ki-moon, secretary-general of the UN, visited the institute and noted the role of Bangladeshi Peacekeepers in UN missions. In 2016, The Royal Thai Army expressed interest to use the institute. The language lab of the institute provides training in foreign languages such as French. It has trained more than 10,000 Bangladeshi peacekeepers.

Groundbreaking ceremony of Female Peacekeepers' Complex was held on 18 April 2026 at Bangladesh Institute of Peace Support Operation Training. The project was titled as "Enhancement of the Capacity of BIPSOT to Train Female Peacekeepers". Special guests present that day were Mr A K M Sohel (Additional Secretary, UN Wing), Sudhir Muralidharan (Country Manager, UNOPS Bangladesh & Bhutan), Gitanjali Singh (Country Representative, UN Women in Bangladesh) and Mr Philippe Bernier Arcand (Second Secretary (Political Affairs) High Commission of Canada, Bangladesh).
