= Black Stream =

People, places, and things commonly known as the Black Stream or a black stream include:

- the black stream glider, a species of dragonfly
- the Kuroshio Current
- in dowsing, a purported cause of Earth radiation resulting in negative effects.
- forms of illegal downloading.
- The Gaelic term for black stream is believed to be the origin of the surname Douglas
