= Manfred Curry =

German-American physician, inventor, sailor and author

Manfred Curry (11 December 1899 – 13 February 1953) was a physician, inventor, sailor and author of American citizenship. He was born in Munich, Germany; his father (Charles) was American and his mother (Adele) Russian.

== Career ==
An accomplished athlete and yachtsman who represented the US at the 1928 Amsterdam Olympic Games, he sailed more than 1400 regattas many of which he won. In later life he worked as a doctor specialising in bioclimatics and became the self-proclaimed discoverer of the pseudoscientific phenomenon of "geomagnetic lines" or "Earth radiation" (ger. Erdstrahlen) called the Curry Grid.

In 1925, Curry wrote a pioneering book on yacht aerodynamics and racing tactics, published through to the present day and widely translated, describing how he undertook a scientific study on sailboat design, testing various rig configurations in a wind-tunnel at Göttingen. The significance of his book within yachting has been described by stating that he was the first to bring engineering analysis of the design of sailboats to the public eye. In the book, he describes several of his inventions or developments that are in widespread use today, including the fully battened mainsail, developments to Genoa jibsails and spinnakers, the 'Park Avenue' boom and the cam cleat (Called the "Curryklemme" in German). He described two successful racing dinghies as well as innovations used on an America's Cup yacht.

His racing dinghy, Aero, which exemplifies many of his technical innovations, has been restored.

In his home town of Riederau on the Ammersee lake, Curry set up the American Bioclimatics Research Institute. After his early death at the age of 53, his widow Maude Hester-Curry dedicated the new name of Manfred Curry Clinic (which is no longer in existence). Curry also investigated the supposed pathogenic properties of "earth radiation", a concept promoted in conjunction with a fellow medical doctor Ernst Hartmann and engineer Siegfried Wittmann. Earth radiation (E-rays) ger. Erdstrahlen, which can only be measured by the subjective technique of dowsing, are not a scientific field of study and are considered to be pseudoscience.

As a youth, together with his father Charles Curry, he was friends with the Irish republican activist Roger Casement during the latter's stay in Germany.

The street Curry Park in his home town of Riederau is named after him.

The magazine Sailing World inducted Manfred Curry posthumously to its Hall of Fame in 1993.

Curry's 1929 medical doctoral thesis was titled Myom und Altersbild.

== See also ==
- Geobiology (pseudoscience)
- Geopathology
- Radiesthesia
