= Nils-Axel Mörner =

Swedish geologist (1938–2020)

Niklas Axel Mörner af Morlanda (17 March 1938 – 16 October 2020), known professionally as Nils-Axel Mörner, was a Swedish geologist and geophysicist. He served as head of the paleogeophysics and geodynamics unit at Stockholm University until his retirement in 2005. He was president of the International Union for Quaternary Research (INQUA) Commission on Neotectonics from 1981 to 1989. He headed an INTAS (International Association for the promotion of cooperation with scientists from the New Independent States of the former Soviet Union) project on geomagnetism and climate from 1997 to 2003. He was a critic of the IPCC and disputed the scientific evidence that the global sea level is rising.

== Views on sea level change ==
Despite scientific evidence, Mörner disputed that future rise in sea level is caused by global warming. Mörner's self-published 2007 the 20-page booklet The Greatest Lie Ever Told, refers to his belief that observational records of sea levels for the past 300 years that show variations – ups and downs, but no significant trend. This contrasts with the IPCC evidence that sea level rise has been occurring at 2–3 mm (0.079–0.118 in) per year, over the last century. Mörner asserts that satellite altimetry data indicate a mean rise in the order of 1.0 mm/yr from 1986 to 1996, whereas most studies find a value around 3 mm/yr.

Mörner believed that sea level rise will not exceed 200 mm (7.9 in), within a range of either +100±100 mm or +50 ± 150 mm (2.0 ± 5.9 in), based on satellite data over the last 40 years and observational records over the last 300 years. In 2004 the president of INQUA wrote that INQUA did not subscribe to Mörner's views on climate change.

In 2000 he launched an international sea level research project in the Maldives which claims to demonstrate an absence of signs of any on-going sea level rise. Despite President Gayoom having spoken in the past about the impending dangers to his country, the Maldives, Mörner concluded that the people of the Maldives have in the past survived a higher sea level about 50–60 cm (1.6–2.0 ft), and there is evidence of a significant sea level fall in the last 30 years in that Indian Ocean area. However, these conclusions were disputed due to lack of known mechanism for a fall in sea level and lack of supporting evidence.

In an interview in June 2007, Mörner described research he had done in the Maldives that had been reported in the documentary Doomsday Called Off. Specifically, he mentioned a tree he had discovered growing close to the shoreline as evidence to support his claim that sea level had actually fallen rather than risen. He also alleged that the tree had been deliberately destroyed by a group of Australian researchers who were promoting the IPCC view that sea level was rising.

Mörner's use of early TOPEX/Poseidon satellite altimeter data to claim that sea levels are not rising was criticised by members of the TOPEX/Poseidon and Jason-1 Science Working Team in Nerem et al. (2007), for ignoring the calibrated satellite altimeter records, which show that sea levels are rising.

"Early releases of the satellite Geophysical Data Records (GDRs) often contain errors in the raw measurements, the measurement corrections, and the orbit estimates that are later corrected through an on-going calibration/validation process defined by the T/P and Jason Science Working Team."

— Nerem et al (2007)

== Involvement with Copernicus Publications ==
In March 2013, open-access scientific publisher Copernicus Publications began publishing Pattern Recognition in Physics, of which Mörner was the co-editor-in-chief, along with Sid-Ali Ouadfeul. The journal was originally supposed to publish general physics-related research, but a study was nevertheless published in the journal in which the authors stated they "doubt the continued, even accelerated, warming as claimed by the IPCC project." Due to both this study and what he called the "nepotistic" appointment of other scientists to the editorial board by Morner and Ouadfeul, Copernicus' managing director Martin Rasmussen terminated the journal in January 2014. In March 2014 Ouadfeul reopened the journal under a different publisher.

== Dowsing ==
In 1995, Mörner gave several courses in dowsing at Stockholm University in the summer program, and also outside of the university. He claimed that dowsing could be used not only to find water, but also to discover Curry and Hartmann lines. When reported in the press, he received sharp criticism from the Swedish scientific community and the Swedish skepticism movement. Mörner persisted and the conflict escalated, leading to a formal ban from the president of the university to teach dowsing, citing the Law on Higher Education, until he could present scientific evidence for dowsing. In the summer of 1996 Mörner held a symposium at the university where he presented what he considered to be supporting evidence for his teachings. A committee appointed by the university dismissed Mörner's claims in December 1996. He was named "Confuser of the Year" for 1995 by Vetenskap och Folkbildning, a Swedish organisation in support of the broadening the understanding of the scientific method. The renowned American skepticist James Randi offered him a reward of US$971,000 if Mörner could show that dowsing worked in a scientifically controlled experiment. Mörner later rejected the offer. In late 2002 Mörner reaffirmed his stance in a documentary on Swedish television.

=== Selected publications ===
- Mörner, Nils-Axel (1 January 2004). "Estimating future sea level changes from past records". Global and Planetary Change. 40 (1–2): 49–54. Bibcode:2004GPC....40...49M. doi:10.1016/S0921-8181(03)00097-3. ISSN 0921-8181.
- Mörner, Nils-Axel (1 January 1976). "Eustatic changes during the last 8,000 years in view of radiocarbon calibration and new information from the Kattegatt region and other northwestern European coastal areas". Palaeogeography, Palaeoclimatology, Palaeoecology. 19 (1): 63–85. Bibcode:1976PPP....19...63M. doi:10.1016/0031-0182(76)90042-0. ISSN 0031-0182.
- Mörner, Nils-Axel (1 March 1976). "Eustasy and Geoid Changes". The Journal of Geology. 84 (2): 123–151. Bibcode:1976JG.....84..123M. doi:10.1086/628184. ISSN 0022-1376. S2CID 128471772.
