= Solco Walle Tromp =

Dutch geologist

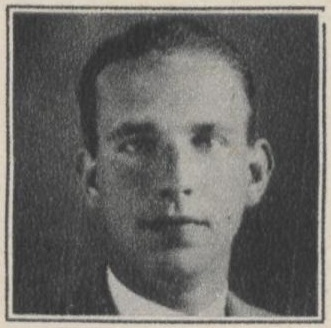
Solco Walle Tromp

Solco Walle Tromp (9, March 1909 - 17, March 1983) was a Dutch geologist and biometeorologist.

Tromp was from 1947 to 1950 Professor of geology at Cairo University. He co-founded the International Society of Biometeorology and published pioneering writings on biometeorology.

Tromp took a deep interest in dowsing and radiesthesia. He conducted experiments and came to the conclusion that dowsing is a real phenomenon due to activity of electromagnetic fields. His views on dowsing were criticized by the scientific community and have been described by critics as an example of pseudoscience.

== Publications ==
- The Religion of the Modern Scientist: Neo-Materialism (1947)
- Psychical Physics: A Scientific Analysis of Dowsing Radiesthesia and Kindred Divining Phenomena (1949)
- Medical Biometeorology: Weather, Climate, and the Living Organism (1963)
- Pathological Biometeorology (1977)
