= Forest Products Research Laboratory =

Former British research institute

The Forest Products Research Laboratory was a research institute in Buckinghamshire, mainly studying the economic value of tropical forests in the British Empire.

== History ==
It was founded by the Forest Products Research Board, established in 1923, overseen by the Department of Scientific and Industrial Research (itself created in 1915). The Forest Products Research Board was mainly interested in the economic value of tropical forests in the British Empire.

The Second British Empire Forestry Conference had been held in 1923. An Empire Forestry Conference had been held earlier in 1920. There was an Empire Forestry Association. The Forest Products Research Laboratories were set up initially at the RAE in north-east Hampshire in 1925. In 1927, a new site was built at Princes Risborough. The site cost £80,000, and was officially opened on 31 July 1928. The first Director was Sir Ralph Pearson, who stayed until 1933. The site was conducting research into the Lyctus (beetle), a pest, and dry rot, caused by fungi.

Around the same time, the Imperial Forestry Institute (now part of the Department of Plant Sciences, University of Oxford) was established in Oxford. It was considered about setting up an Empire Forestry Bureau, to disseminate information about forestry research around the Empire. Also in Buckinghamshire was the Parasite Laboratory, part of the Imperial Bureau of Entomology in London, later the Commonwealth Institute of Entomology which produced the Bulletin of Entomological Research, and is now represented by CABI in Oxfordshire. From February to April 1928, an Empire Timber Exhibition was held at the Imperial Institute (now the site of Imperial College London). The Parasite Laboratory closed in 1940.

In 1928, research was carried out across the UK into Dutch elm disease. In 1931 it carried out work into the Deathwatch beetle; the first investigation into this pest had been by Harold Maxwell-Lefroy at Imperial College in 1914. Prince Philip, Duke of Edinburgh visited the site on 30 April 1952. The Director from 1945 to 1960 was Prof Frank Henderson.

In August 1958, it was decided by the Council for Scientific and Industrial Research that the government could not continue funding into the forestry products research, and that the timber industry should pay for it themselves, with funding being withdrawn from around 1963. The Forest Products Research Board closed in 1958, with some research passing to the Timber Development Association (now called TRADA). From 1960 to 1962 the Director was Sir Alcon Copisarow, who became the Chief Scientific Officer from 1962 to 1964 at the Ministry of Technology. From the 1960s, the site was run under the Ministry of Technology.

=== Absorption ===
On 1 January 1971, the site was transferred to be overseen by the Department of the Environment. Even greater changes occurred in 1972, when it was absorbed into the BRE.

The site at Princes Risborough continued with work into timber research until 1988, being known as Princes Risborough Laboratory.

== Structure ==
It was sited in Princes Risborough in Wycombe District. It was run by the Department of the Environment.

== Function ==
It conducted extensive and widespread research into the strength of wood and timber, and decay of wood.

== See also ==
- Forest Products Laboratory (Madison, Wisconsin, USA), established 1910
- Forestry in the United Kingdom
