= Michel Moine =

Michel Moine holding a can that contained 400 ancient gold coins (Louis d'or). The can was unearthed in an old lady's cellar.

Michel Moine (8 March 1920 in Airvault – 15 January 2005 in Buxerolles) was a French journalist and parapsychologist. He was the director of the news division of RTL from 1958 to 1967, and then of RMC from 1967 to 1982. He was also well known for his books on radiesthesia, and the series of TV documentaries La caméra de l'étrange, created with his friend and fellow journalist Jean-Louis Degaudenzi.

== The early years ==
Michel Moine was born on 8 March 1920 in Airvault (France). After a schooling at the Jesuit collège of Le Mans (he tells some stories from that period in the Guide of radiesthesia), then at lycée in Poitiers, he obtains his baccalauréat (French equivalent of A levels or High School graduation) and moves to Paris. There he obtains a diploma from the École du Louvre, and another diploma from the Sorbonne.

== The parapsychologist and the journalist : two careers in parallel ==
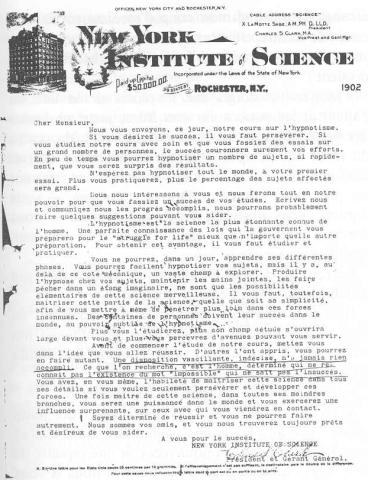
Hypnosis correspondence course found in his grandparents' attic.

According to biographical elements in the Guide of radiesthesia, his career as occultist began the day before his first communion, when he found a 1902 brochure from a New York City correspondence course in hypnosis in his grandparents' attic. Following the instructions in the course, he succeeds in his attempt to put to sleep Fernand, the fifteen-year-old gardener helper of the family, but then he could not wake him up. At first he considered writing to the New York Institute of Science for help, but the answer would have taken way too long. So he skimmed feverishly through the rest of the course in the hope to find and answer, and it was finally lesson XVII, "How to wake up hypnotised subjects" that saved young Fernand from sleep therapy.

He voluntarily enlisted in the French army in 1939 (at the age of 19) and was taken prisoner, but finally managed to escape after several attempts. During one of his attempts he was shot in the leg.

At the end of World War II, he became a member of the special services of the provisional government. He was decorated with the Ordre National du Mérite, the Médaille des Évadés, and the Croix du combattant volontaire 1939-1945. He also became secretary for writer and Goncourt academician Jean Ajalbert, and began his career as a journalist by reporting for the daily newspaper La Presse.

In 1948, he founded a small publishing house called Les Éditions de l'Ermite, and published La Théosophie au XX^{e} siècle, by Marcel Bohrer, as well as his two first books on radiesthesia. This same year his son Jean-Louis was born.

In 1954, he founded the periodical Radiesthésie Magazine.

In 1958, he became director of information for RTL Radio, and had to set aside his occult interests for the sake of his reputation. He ceased involvement with Radiesthésie Magazine, which continued without him until the mid-1970s.

On 5 July 1959, after the failure of his first marriage, he met the journalist Françoise Eschmann, daughter of Paul Eschmann, architect from the city of Nancy.

In 1967, he left RTL for RMC where he did the same thing as director of information until 1982.

In 1973, he published his Guide de la Radiesthésie, now considered a classic.

In the early 1980s, he directed a series of documentaries on parapsychology, in collaboration with his fellow journalist and friend Jean-Louis Degaudenzi: La caméra de l'étrange, for RTL Television.

In 1987, he founded a small radio station, Radio Val d'Or (R.V.O.), in his birthplace of Airvault.

En 1990, he was appointed by the CSA as Conseiller du comité technique radiophonique de la région Centre.

Michel Moine died on 15 January 2005 in Buxerolles.

== Bibliography ==
- Guérir par la radiesthésie - Michel Moine, éd. de l'Ermite, 1952.
- La radiesthésie en images - Michel Moine, éd. de l'Ermite, 1952.
- Guide de la radiesthésie - Michel Moine, éd. Stock, 1973.
- Découvrons des pouvoirs de l'esprit - Françoise et Michel Moine, éd. de Mortagne, 1983.
- Développez vos pouvoirs Psi - Françoise et Michel Moine, éd. Stock, 1986.
- Radiesthésie - Le pendule et la baguette - Michel Moine, éd. De Bartillat, 1988.
- Guide de géobiologie - Michel Moine, Jean-Louis Degaudenzi, éd. De Bartillat, 1993.
- Guide pratique de la radiesthésie - Michel Moine, éd. Le centre du livre naturel, 1998.
- Mieux vivre avec les objets qui nous entourent - Michel Moine, Jean-Louis Degaudenzi, éd. De Bartillat, 1998.

== See also ==
- Radiesthesia
- Dowsing
