= Biometeorology =

Science of climate's effect on living things

Biometeorology is the interdisciplinary field of science that studies the interactions between living things (plants, microbes, vertebrates, invertebrates) and atmospheric phenomena (wind, temperature, humidity, sunlight, greenhouse gas concentrations) on time scales of the order of seasons or shorter (in contrast with bioclimatology).

The field of Biometeorology can be very broad, including roles of weather on: 1) human health; 2) outbreaks of insects and pathogens, 3) the health and production of dairy, cattle, pigs and chickens, 4) frost prevention, 5) irrigation management, 6) modeling of crop growth, yield and crop management, 7) study of phenological growth stages, 8) integrated assessments with remote sensing and 9) future changes in these systems with global warming and land use change

== Examples of relevant processes ==
Weather events influence biological processes on short time scales. For instance, as the Sun rises above the horizon in the morning, light levels become sufficient for the process of photosynthesis to take place in plant leaves. Later on, during the day, air temperature and humidity may induce the partial or total closure of the stomata, a typical response of many plants to limit the loss of water through transpiration. More generally, the daily evolution of meteorological variables controls the circadian rhythm of plants and animals alike.

Living organisms, for their part, can collectively affect weather patterns. The rate of evapotranspiration of forests, or of any large vegetated area for that matter, contributes to the release of water vapor in the atmosphere. This local, relatively fast and continuous process may contribute significantly to the persistence of precipitations in a given area. As another example, the wilting of plants results in definite changes in leaf angle distribution and therefore modifies the rates of reflection, transmission and absorption of solar light in these plants. That, in turn, changes the albedo of the ecosystem as well as the relative importance of the sensible and latent heat fluxes from the surface to the atmosphere. The height and roughness of vegetation affects wind drag and turbulence. This can alter the log wind profile above it.

Phenology is another topic studied by biometeorologists. Phenology is a subject that examines features of life history of plants, like when leaves out and flowering occur. These events are often triggered by temperature and heat accumulation indices.

== Human biometeorology ==
The methods and measurements traditionally used in biometeorology are not different when applied to study the interactions between human bodies and the atmosphere, but some aspects or applications may have been explored more extensively. For instance, wind chill has been investigated to determine the time period an individual can sustain exposure to given temperature and wind conditions. Another important example concerns the study of airborne allergens (such as pollens and aerosols) and their impact on individuals: weather conditions can favor or hinder the release as well as the transport and deposition of these allergens, sometimes severely affecting the well-being of sensitive populations.

== See also ==
- International Journal of Biometeorology
- International Society of Biometeorology
- Gaia hypothesis

Weather's health effects:

- Health effects of smog
- Thunderstorm asthma
- Weather pains
