= Hans-Dieter Betz =

German professor emeritus of experimental physics

Hans-Dieter Betz (born 29 September 1940) is a German professor emeritus of experimental physics.

== Fields of research ==
Beside atomic physics, Betz searched on Sferics, where he leads a research group at LMU Munich.

Betz also investigates Radiesthesia and Dowsing, ten years in Order by the German Government. For example, the extensive Munich Scheunenexperimenten.
