= J. Cecil Maby =

British paranormal researcher (1902-1971)

Joseph Cecil Maby
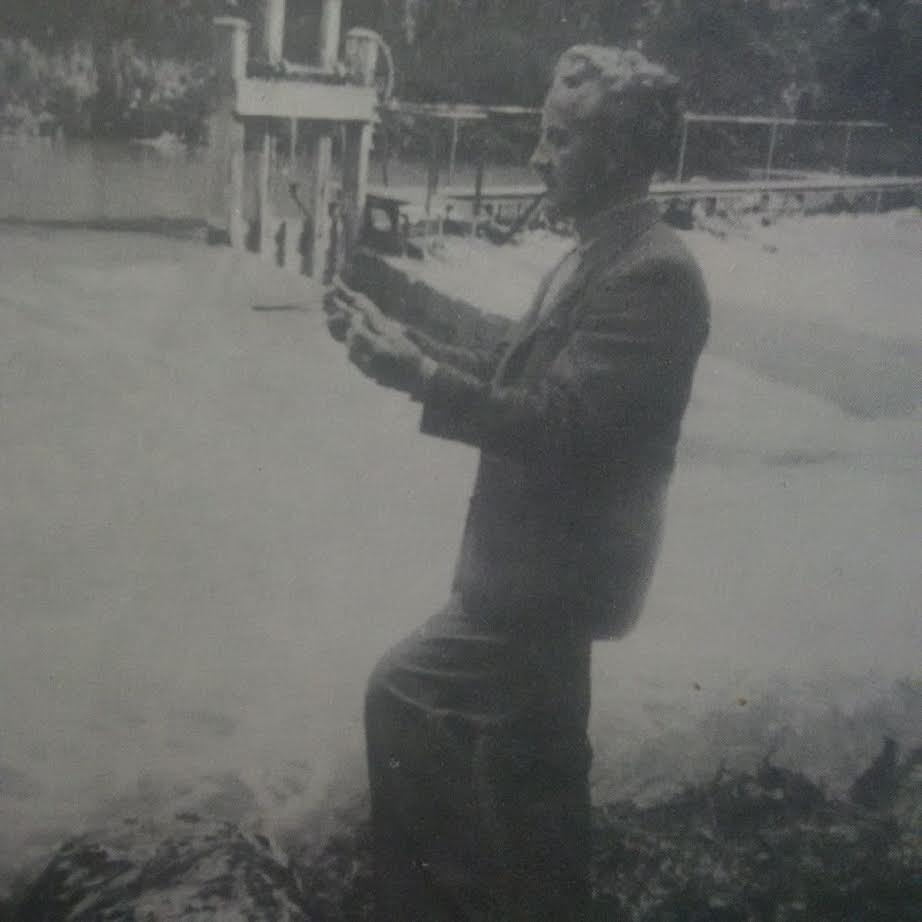
- Maby dowsing at River Leven, Fife
- Born: 1902
- Died: 1971 (aged 68–69)
- Occupations: Physicist, dowser

Joseph Cecil Maby, B.Sc., ARCS, FRAS, (1902-1971) was a British biophysicist, dowser and psychical researcher.

Maby was born in the Colony of Natal and his family returned to England in 1903, shortly after he was born. His father, Joseph Maby (1865-1927) had been a railway contractor, building various railways in Natal and the Transvaal. His mother, Annie Leila (née Yates), was from Abergavenny. His father was of mostly English heritage but had also been born in Wales. They settled in Marle Hill, Cheltenham, where Joseph Maby had a small farm where he kept a herd of pedigree Jersey cows. Maby believed that he had experienced paranormal events at his family's home. He developed a lifelong interest in psychical research.

Maby was educated at Cheltenham College, Imperial College London, and the University of London. After leaving university, he found employment as a research assistant at the Forest Products Research Laboratory, Buckinghamshire, and subsequently became a teacher at the Imperial Forestry Institute, Oxford.

Several of Maby’s scientific papers related to the study of woods are currently available as downloads on the Internet. Micellar Structure of the Tracheide Wall in Certain Woods, in Relation to Morphogenetic and Mechanical Factors, first published in 1935, is available on the New Phytologist Foundation website. The identification of wood and wood charcoal fragments (1931) and Further notes on the identification of woods and charcoals (1932) are available from the Royal Society of Chemistry. Wood Fragments from a Lake Settlement at Auvernier, Switzerland (1928) is available from the Cambridge University Press.

With physicist T. Bedford Franklin, Maby wrote the book The Physics of the Dowsing Rod (1939). They postulated that dowsing occurred due to some form of radiation. A review in Nature noted that there is "no direct evidence for such waves and the author's discussion of their polarization cannot be justified on our present physical knowledge." Psychologist Donovan Rawcliffe wrote that claims in the book have no scientific validity. However, a review of the book in Scientific American (Feb.1941) was somewhat more positive, stating that, “The whole subject is treated at great length and entirely in terms of modern physical science.”

Maby was a Fellow of the Royal Astronomical Society. He was a member of the British Society of Dowsers and Society for Psychical Research.

== Publications ==
=== Books ===
- Walls of Jericho (1932) OCLC 2980019
- By Stygian Waters (1933) OCLC 6717220
- The Physics of the Divining Rod; being an account of an experimental investigation of water and mineral divining (1939, 1978) [with Thomas Bedford Franklin] OCLC 221162635, 2311518
- Co-operative healing: the curative properties of human radiations (1947) [with Leon Ernest Eeman] OCLC 4812229, 559677865
- Confessions of a Sensitive: a critical study of the paranormal and of occult faculties in man (1966) OCLC 6621144
- Physical Principles of Radiesthesia; collected papers: 1944-65 (1966) OCLC 14502425
- A Naturalist at Large: a candid commentary upon modern life and fashions (1967) OCLC 30282781

=== Papers ===
- Maby, C. (1935). An Experimental Test of Astrological Claims. Journal of the British Astronomical Association 45: 165-166.
- Maby, C. (1936). Micellar Structure of the Tracheide Wall in Certain Woods, in Relation to Morphogenetic and Mechanical Factors. New Phytologist 35 (5): 432-455.
- Maby, C. (1940). Science and the Divining Rod. Journal of the Royal Society of Arts 88 (4559): 520-539.
