= James Enright =

James Enright may refer to:

- James Enright (referee), American basketball referee and sportswriter
- James Enright (athlete), Canadian Paralympic athlete
- Jim T. Enright, professor of behavioral physiology
