= Radiometer Assessment using Vertically Aligned Nanotubes =

The Radiometer Assessment using Vertically Aligned Nanotubes (RAVAN) was an experiment launched into low Earth orbit on November 11, 2016. It successfully collected data for 20 months.

RAVAN's goal is to test new technologies that help measure Earth's radiation imbalance, which is the difference between the amount of energy received from the Sun that reaches Earth and the amount that is reflected and emitted back into the outer space. Theoretical estimates of the difference in the thermal energy is estimated to be at less than one percent.

The experiment was designed by Johns Hopkins University's Applied Physics Laboratory, in collaboration with NASA’s Jet Propulsion Laboratory.
