= Dowsing =

Pseudoscientific attempts to locate underground objects

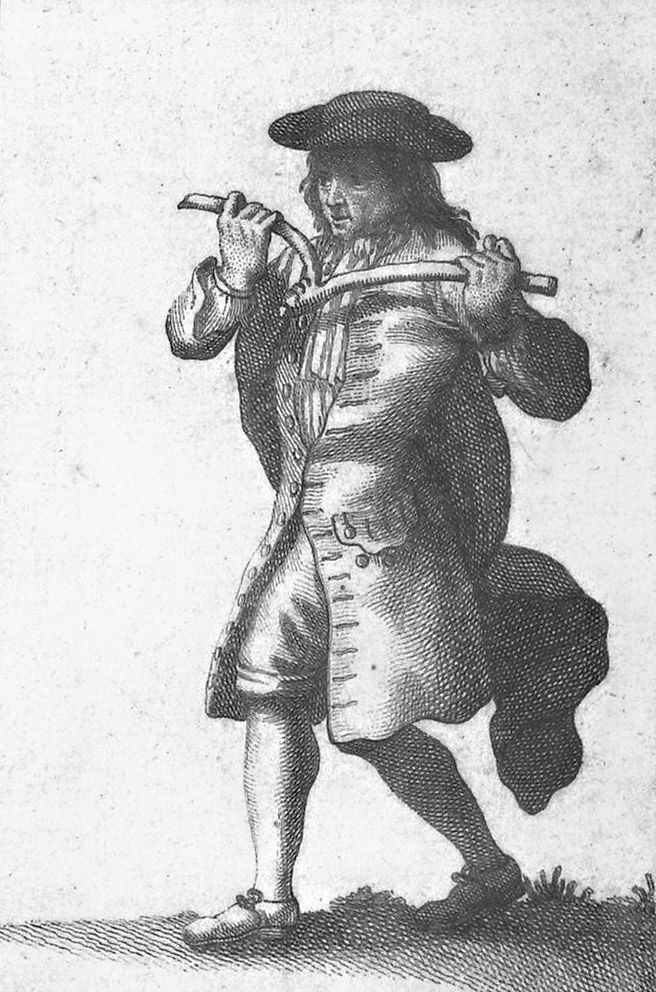
A dowser, from an 18th-century French book about superstitions

Dowsing is a type of divination employed in attempts to locate many types of objects and materials without the use of technical equipment or a scientific apparatus. It may be applied to seek ground water, buried metals or ores, gemstones, oil, claimed radiations (radiesthesia), gravesites, or malign "earth vibrations". It is also known as divining (especially in water divining), doodlebugging (Note: The term doodlebugging may also refer to legitimate oil exploration methods such as reflection seismology, but many geophysicists have historically rejected the label to differentiate their practices from dowsing.) (particularly in the United States, in searching for petroleum or treasure) or water finding, or water witching (in the United States).

A Y-shaped twig or rod, or two L-shaped ones, called dowsing rods or divining rods are normally used, and the motion of these are said to reveal the location of the target material. The motion of such dowsing devices is generally attributed to random movement, or to the ideomotor phenomenon, a psychological response where a subject makes motions unconsciously.

The scientific evidence shows that dowsing is no more effective than random chance. It is therefore regarded as a pseudoscience.

== History ==
=== Early divination and religion ===
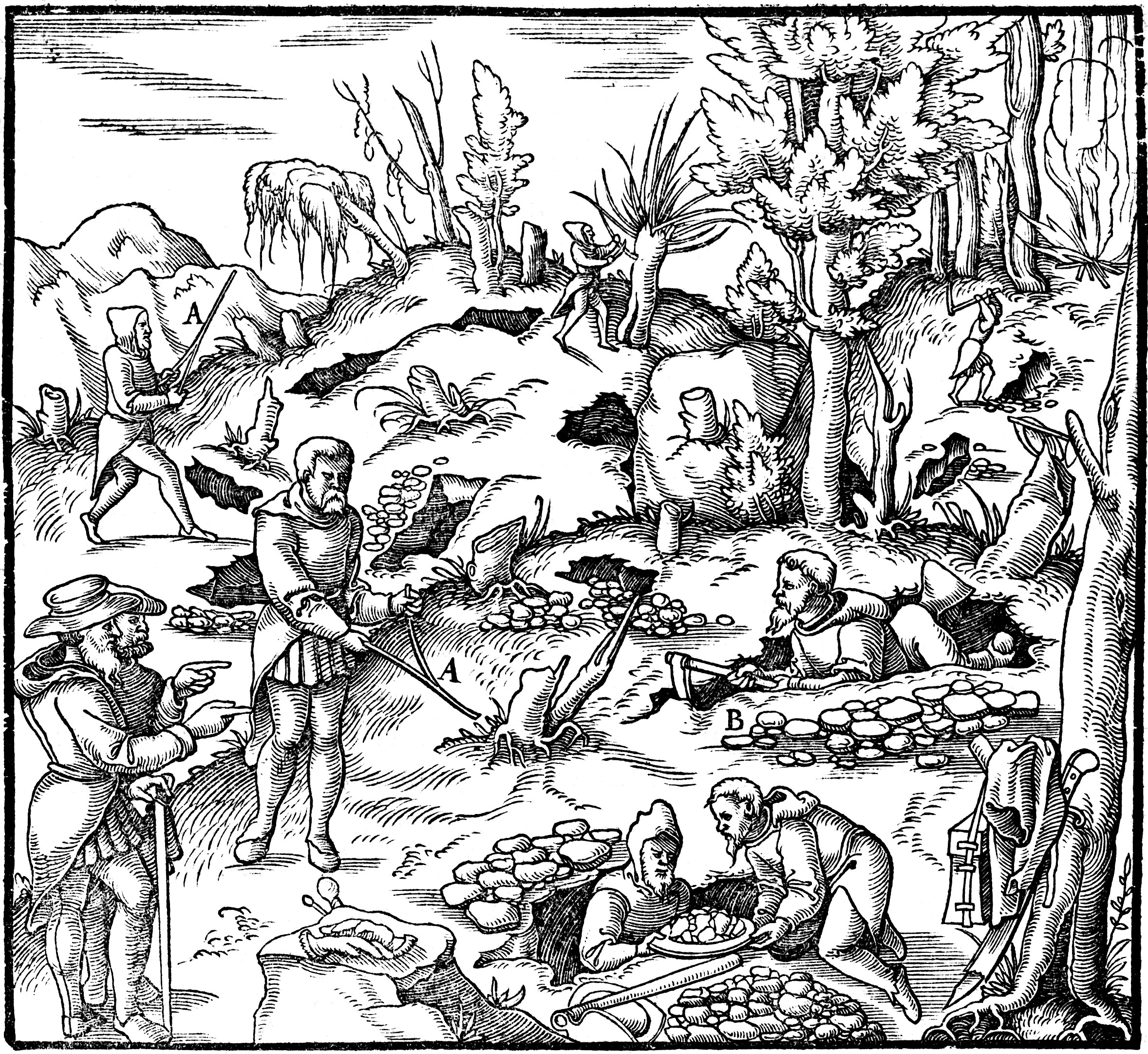
Dowsing for metal ore, from 1556 "De re metallica libri XII" book

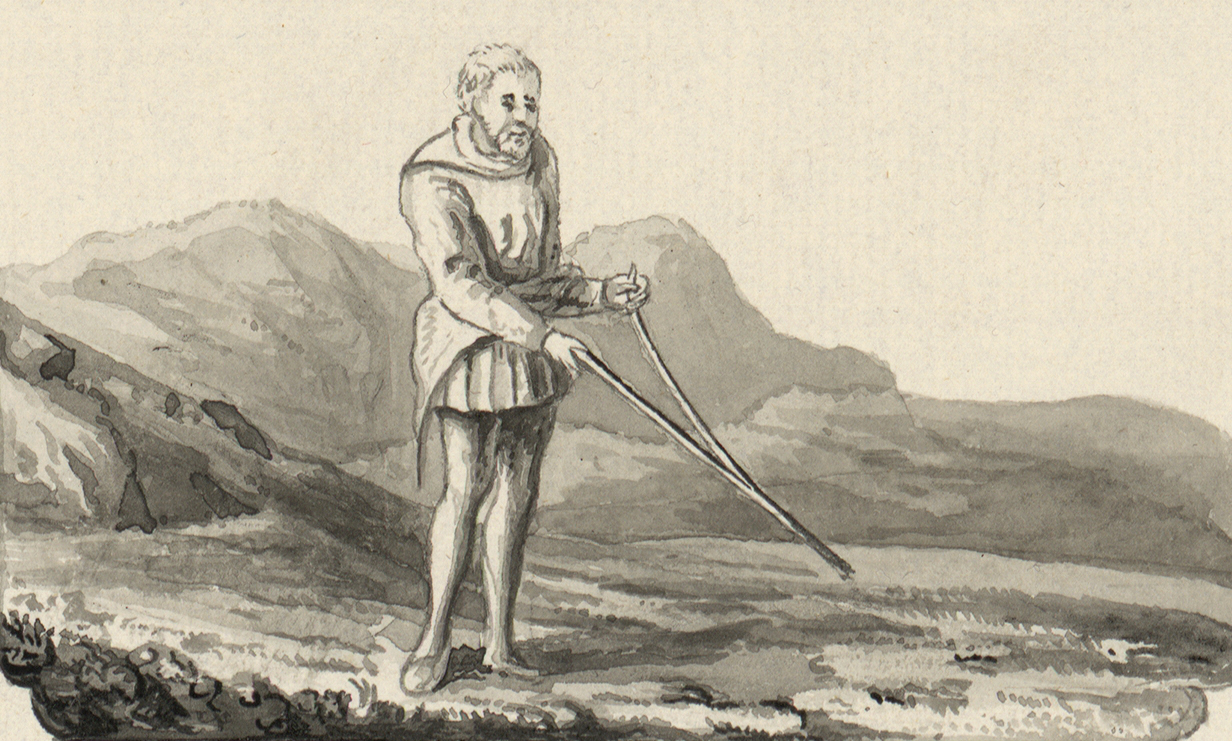
Use of a divining Rod observed in Great Britain in the late 18th century

An illustration of a divining rod

Dowsing originated in ancient times, when it was treated as a form of divination. The Catholic Church banned the practice completely.

Protestant Reformer Martin Luther perpetuated the Catholic ban, in 1518 listing divining for metals as an act that broke the first commandment (i.e., as occultism).

Old texts about searching for water do not mention using the divining twig, and the first account of this practice was in 1568. Sir William F. Barrett wrote in his 1911 book Psychical Research that:

...in a recent admirable Life of St. Teresa of Spain, the following incident is narrated: Teresa in 1568 was offered the site for a convent to which there was only one objection, there was no water supply; happily, a Friar Antonio came up with a twig in his hand, stopped at a certain spot and appeared to be making the sign of the cross; but Teresa says, "Really I cannot be sure if it were the sign he made, at any rate he made some movement with the twig and then he said, ' Dig just here '; they dug, and lo ! a plentiful fount of water gushed forth, excellent for 'drinking, copious for washing, and it never ran dry.' " As the writer of this Life remarks: "Teresa, not having heard of dowsing, has no explanation for this event", and regarded it as a miracle. This, I believe, is the first historical reference to dowsing for water.

In 1662, divining with rods was declared to be "superstitious, or rather satanic" by a Jesuit, Gaspar Schott, though he later noted that he was not sure that the devil was always responsible for the movement of the rod. In southern France in the 17th century, it was used to track criminals and heretics. Its abuse led to a decree of the inquisition in 1701, forbidding its employment for purposes of justice.

An epigram by Samuel Sheppard, from Epigrams theological, philosophical, and romantick (1651) runs thus:

Some Sorcerers do boast they have a Rod,
Gather'd with Vowes and Sacrifice,
And (borne about) will strangely nod
To hidden Treasure where it lies;
Mankind is (sure) that Rod divine,
For to the Wealthiest (ever) they incline.

— Virgula divina

=== Modern dowsing ===
Dowsing practices used in an attempt to locate metals are still performed much like they were during the 16th century. The 1550 edition of Sebastian Münster's Cosmographia contains a woodcut of a dowser with forked rod in hand walking over a cutaway image of a mining operation. The rod is labeled in Latin and German; "Virgula Divina – Glück-Rüt" ('Rod Divine, Luck-Rod'), but there is no text accompanying the woodcut. By 1556, Georgius Agricola's treatment of mining and smelting of ore, De Re Metallica, included a detailed description of dowsing for metal ore.

...There are many great contentions between miners concerning the forked twig, for some say that it is of the greatest use in discovering veins, and others deny it. ... All alike grasp the forks of the twig with their hands, clenching their fists, it being necessary that the clenched fingers should be held toward the sky in order that the twig should be raised at that end where the two branches meet. Then they wander hither and thither at random through mountainous regions. It is said that the moment they place their feet on a vein the twig immediately turns and twists, and so by its action discloses the vein; when they move their feet again and go away from that spot the twig becomes once more immobile. ...

In the 16th century, German deep mining technology was in enormous demand all over Europe. German miners were licensed to live and work in England, particularly in the Stannaries (tin mines) of Devon and Cornwall and in Cumbria. In other parts of England, the technique was used in the royal mines for calamine. By 1638 German miners were recorded using the technique in silver mines in Wales.

The Middle Low German name for a forked stick (Y-rod) was Schlag-Ruthe ('striking rod'). This was translated in the sixteenth century Cornish dialect to duschen (duschan according to William Barrett) (Middle English, 'to strike, fall'). By the seventeenth century the English term dowsing was coming into common use.

In the lead-mining area of the Mendip Hills in Somerset, England in the 17th century the natural philosopher Robert Boyle, inspired by the writings of Agricola, watched a practitioner try to find "latent veins of metals". Boyle saw the hazel divining rod (virgula divinatoria) stoop in the hands of the diviner, who protested that he was not applying any force to the twig; Boyle accepted the man's genuine belief but himself remained unconvinced. Towards the end of the century, in 1691 the philosopher John Locke, who was born in the English West Country, used the term deusing-rod for the Old Latin name virgula divina. So, dowse is synonymous with strike, hence the phrases: to dowse/strike a light, to dowse/strike a sail.

Dowsing was conducted in South Dakota in the late 19th and early 20th centuries to help homesteaders, farmers and ranchers locate water wells on their property.

The military have occasionally resorted to dowsing techniques. In the First World War Gallipoli campaign, sapper Stephen Kelly, of the 3rd Light Horse Brigade, Australian Expeditionary Force, became well known for finding water for the British troops. In the late 1960s during the Vietnam War, some United States Marines used dowsing when locating weapons and tunnels. As late as in 1986, when 31 soldiers were taken by an avalanche during an operation in the NATO drill Anchor Express in Vassdalen, Norway, the Norwegian army attempted to locate soldiers buried in the avalanche using dowsing as a search method.

Dowsing is still used by some farmers and water engineers in Britain; however, many of the country's utilities have distanced themselves from the practice.

=== Postulated mechanisms ===
Early attempts at an explanation of dowsing were based on the notion that the divining rod was physically affected by emanations from substances of interest. The following explanation is from William Pryce's 1778 Mineralogia Cornubiensis:

The corpuscles... that rise from the Minerals, entering the rod, determine it to bow down, in order to render it parallel to the vertical lines which the effluvia describe in their rise. In effect the Mineral particles seem to be emitted from the earth; now the Virgula [rod], being of a light porous wood, gives an easy passage to these particles, which are also very fine and subtle; the effluvia then driven forwards by those that follow them, and pressed at the same time by the atmosphere incumbent on them, are forced to enter the little interstices between the fibres of the wood, and by that effort they oblige it to incline, or dip down perpendicularly, to become parallel with the little columns which those vapours form in their rise.

A study towards the end of the 19th century concluded that the phenomenon was attributed to cryptaesthesia, where the practitioner makes unconscious observations of the terrain and involuntarily influences the movement of the rod. Early investigations by members of the Society for Psychical Research endorsed this view.

Committed parapsychologist G. N. M. Tyrrell also believed that the action of the rod was caused by involuntary muscular movements and debunked the theory of external influences.

Dowsing over maps, prior to visiting the site, was also believed to work, hence some kind of clairvoyance was proposed. This was believed to act on the nervous system, rather than on the muscles directly. These various mechanisms remain in contention among dowsers.

=== Fraudulent security devices ===
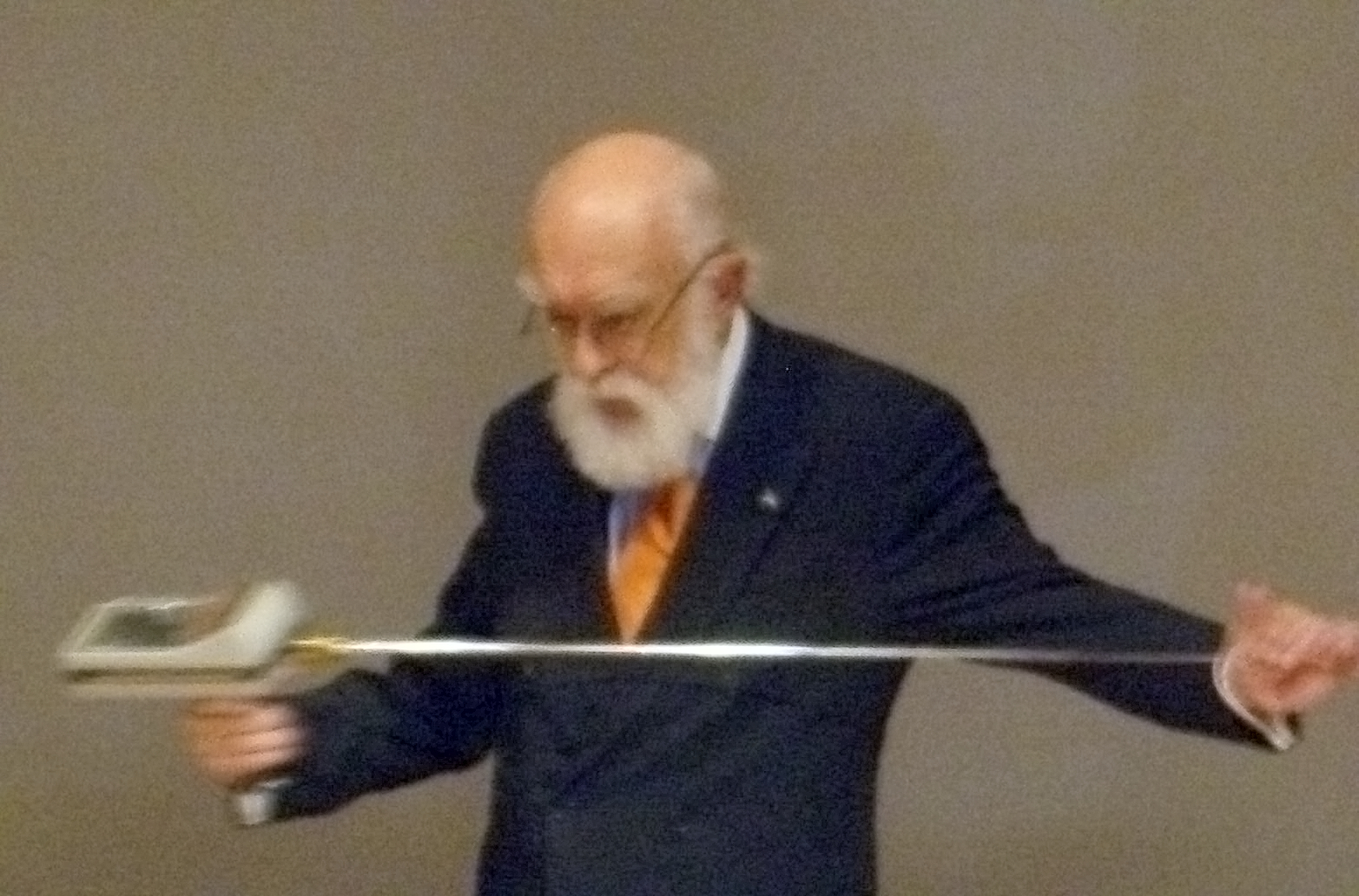
Skeptic James Randi at a lecture at Rockefeller University, on October 10, 2008, holding a US$800 device advertised as a dowsing instrument

In the late twentieth and early twenty-first centuries, a number of dowsing-like devices were marketed for modern police and military use, primarily as explosive detectors, such as the ADE 651, Sniffex, and the GT200. In consequence of these frauds, in 1999 the United States National Institute of Justice issued advice against buying equipment based on dowsing. Despite failing testing by the U.S. Navy, the U.S. Department of Defense bought eight Sniffex rods in 2007. In 2016, in the wake of the Baghdad Bombings, the Prime Minister of Iraq ordered police to cease use of ADE 651 detectors.

== Equipment ==
The device used by a dowser is typically referred to as a dowsing or divining rod, even though it may not be rod-shaped.

=== Dowsing twig ===
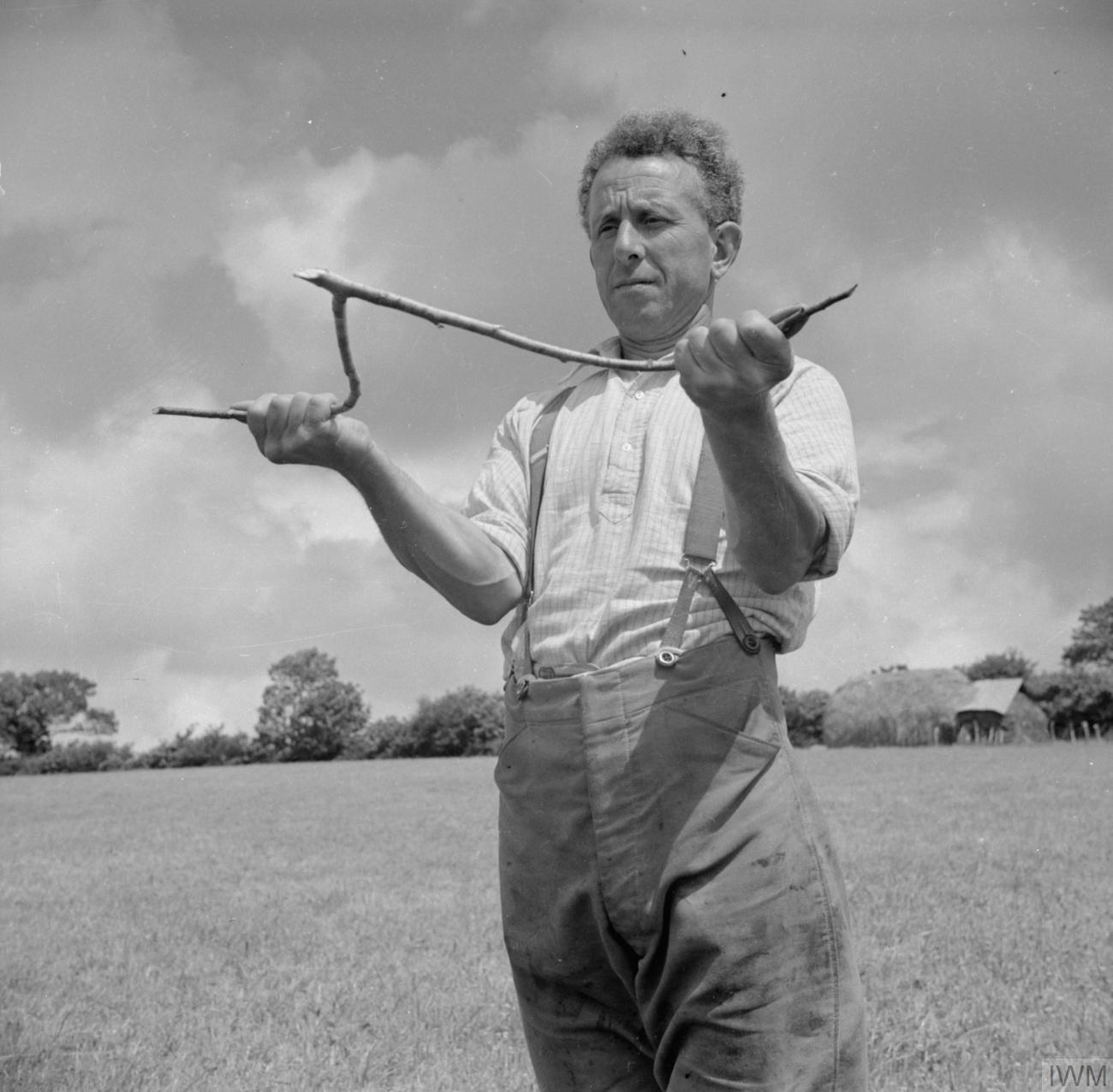
George Casely uses a hazel twig to search for water on the land around his Devon farm, 1942.

Traditionally, the most common method used is the dowsing twig, a forked (Y-shaped) branch from a tree or bush. Some dowsers prefer branches from particular trees, and some prefer the branches to be freshly cut. Hazel twigs in Europe and witch-hazel in the United States are traditionally commonly chosen, as are branches from willow or peach trees. The two ends on the forked side are held one in each hand with the third (the stem of the Y) pointing straight ahead. The dowser then walks slowly over the places where the target (for example, minerals or water) may be, and the dowsing rod is expected to dip, incline or twitch when a discovery is made. This method is sometimes known as "willow witching." Some dowsers would hang a golden ring on the edge of the dowsing rod, or split the tip to slide in a silver coin.

=== Pair of rods ===
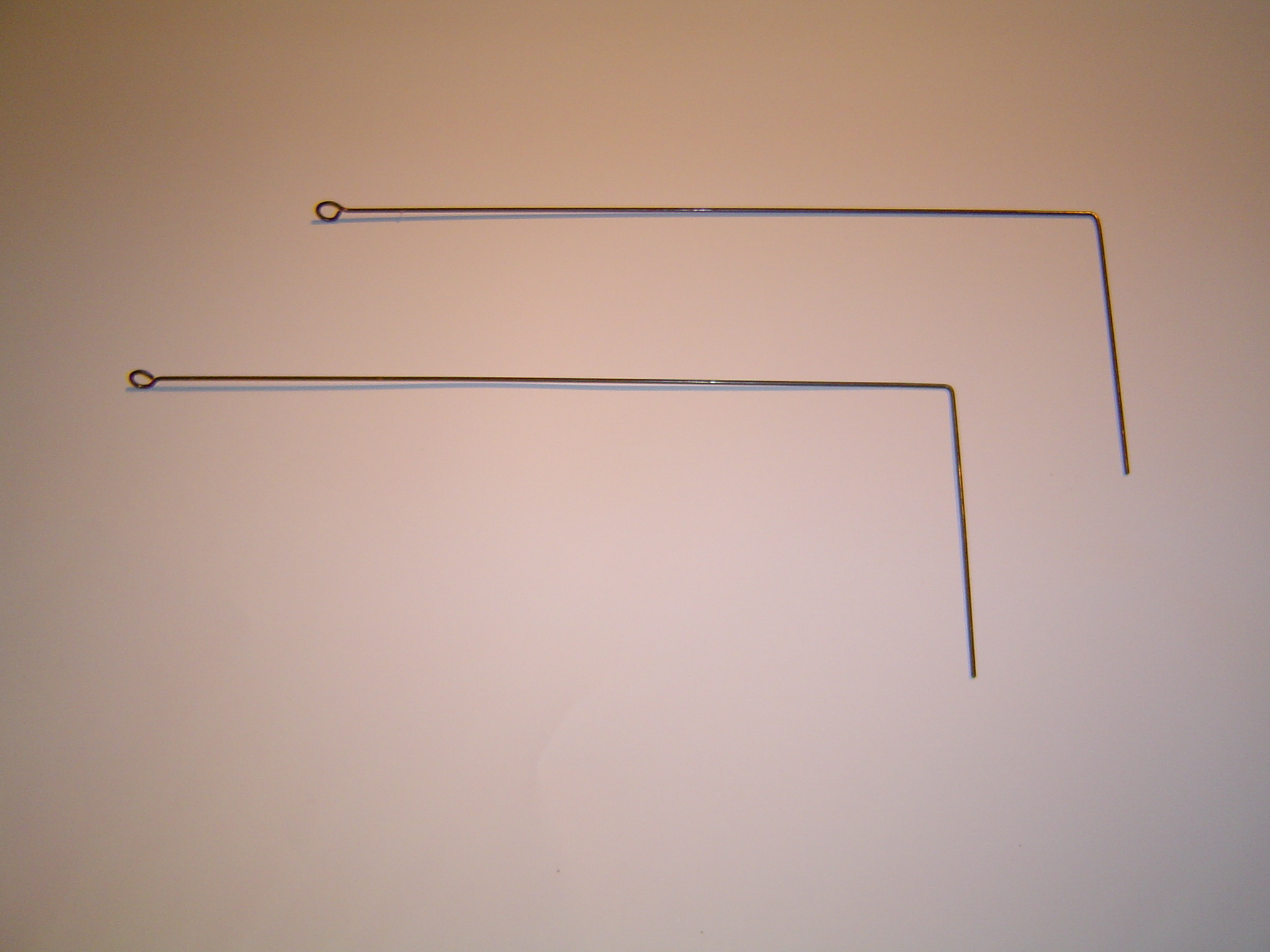
Two L-shaped metal wire rods

Many modern dowsers use a pair of L-shaped metal rods. One rod is held in each hand, with the short arm of the L held upright, and the long arm pointing forward. The upright arm is often free to rotate inside a tube. When something is "found," the rods move in synchrony. Depending on the dowser, they may cross over or swing apart. If the object is long and straight, such as a water pipe, the rods may point in opposite directions, showing its orientation. The rods may be fashioned from wire coat hangers or wire flags used for locating utilities. Glass or plastic rods have also been accepted. Straight rods are also sometimes used for the same purposes, and were common in early 19th century New England.

=== Pendulum ===
Some modern dowsers use a pendulum weight on a short cord or thread. The dowser holds the cord in one hand and allows the pendulum to swing freely. The dowser then observes how the pendulum is swinging and interprets the motion to offer insights.

== Studies ==
- Dowsing studies from the early twentieth century were examined by geologist John Walter Gregory in a report for the Smithsonian Institution. Gregory concluded that the results were a matter of chance or explained by observations from ground surface clues.
- Geologist W. A. MacFadyen tested three dowsers during 1943–1944 in Algeria. The results were entirely negative.
- A 1948 study in New Zealand by P. A. Ongley tested 75 dowsers' ability to detect water. None of them was more reliable than chance. According to Ongley "not one showed the slightest accuracy."
- Archaeometrist Martin Aitken tested British dowser P. A. Raine in 1959. Raine failed to dowse the location of a buried kiln that had been identified by a magnetometer.
- In 1971, dowsing experiments were organized by British engineer R. A. Foulkes on behalf of the Ministry of Defence. The results were "no more reliable than a series of guesses".
- Physicists John Taylor and Eduardo Balanovski reported in 1978 a series of experiments they conducted that searched for unusual electromagnetic fields emitted by dowsing subjects; they did not detect any.
- A 1979 review by Evon Z. Vogt and Ray Hyman examined many controlled studies of dowsing for water, and found that none of them showed better than chance results.
- British academics Richard N. Bailey, Eric Cambridge, and H. Denis Briggs, carried out dowsing experiments at the grounds of various churches. They reported successful results in their book Dowsing and Church Archaeology (1988). Their experiments were critically examined by archaeologist Martijn Van Leusen who suggested they were badly designed and the authors had redefined the test parameters on what was classified as a "hit" or "miss" to obtain positive results.
- A 2006 study of grave dowsing in Iowa reviewed 14 published studies and determined that none of them correctly predicted the location of human burials, and simple scientific experiments demonstrated that the fundamental principles commonly used to explain grave dowsing were incorrect.
- A randomized double-blind trial in 2012 was carried out to determine whether homeopaths were able to distinguish between Bryonia and placebo by use of a dowsing method. The results were negative.

=== Kassel 1991 study ===
A 1990 double-blind study was undertaken in Kassel, Germany, under the direction of the Gesellschaft zur Wissenschaftlichen Untersuchung von Parawissenschaften (Society for the Scientific Investigation of the Parasciences). James Randi offered a US$10,000 prize to any successful dowser. The three-day test of some thirty dowsers involved plastic pipes through which water flow could be controlled and directed. The pipes were buried 50 centimeters (19.7 in) under a level field, the position of each marked on the surface with a colored strip. The dowsers had to tell whether water was running through each pipe. All the dowsers signed a statement agreeing this was a fair test of their abilities and that they expected a 100% success rate. However, the results were no better than chance, and no one was awarded the prize.

=== Betz 1990 study ===
In a study at LMU Munich from 1987 to 1988 by Hans-Dieter Betz and other scientists, 500 dowsers were initially tested for their skill, and the experimenters selected the best 43 among them for further tests. Water was pumped through a pipe on the ground floor of a two-story barn. Before each test, the pipe was moved in a direction perpendicular to the water flow. On the upper floor, each dowser was asked to determine the position of the pipe. Over two years, the dowsers performed 843 such tests and, of the 43 pre-selected and extensively tested candidates, at least 37 showed no dowsing ability. The results from the remaining 6 were said to be better than chance, resulting in the experimenters' conclusion that some dowsers "in particular tasks, showed an extraordinarily high rate of success, which can scarcely if at all be explained as due to chance … a real core of dowser-phenomena can be regarded as empirically proven."

Five years after the study at LMU Munich was published, Jim T. Enright, a professor of physiology who emphasized correct data analysis procedure, contended that the study's results are merely consistent with statistical fluctuations and not significant. He believed the experiments provided "the most convincing disproof imaginable that dowsers can do what they claim", stating that the data analysis was "special, unconventional and customized". Replacing it with "more ordinary analyses", he noted that the best dowser was on average 4 millimeters (0.16 in) out of 10 meters (32.81 ft) closer to a mid-line guess, an advantage of 0.04%, and that the five other "good" dowsers were on average farther than a mid-line guess. Enright emphasized that the experimenters should have decided beforehand how to statistically analyze the results; if they only afterward chose the statistical analysis that showed the greatest success, then their conclusions would not be valid until replicated by another test analyzed by the same method. He further pointed out that the six "good" dowsers did not perform any better than chance in separate tests. Another study published in Pathophysiology hypothesized that such experiments as this one that were carried out in the twentieth century could have been interfered with by man-made radio frequency radiation, as test subjects' bodies absorbed the radio waves and unconscious hand movement reactions took place following the standing waves or intensity variations.

== Scientific reception ==
=== Ideomotor phenomenon ===
Science writers such as William Benjamin Carpenter (1877), Millais Culpin (1920), and Martin Gardner (1957) accept the view of some dowsers that the movement of dowsing rods is the result of unconscious muscular action. This view is widely accepted amongst the scientific community. The dowsing apparatus is known to amplify slight movements of the hands caused by a phenomenon known as the ideomotor response: people's subconscious minds may influence their bodies without consciously deciding to take action. This would make the dowsing rod susceptible to the dowsers' subconscious knowledge or perception; and also to confirmation bias.

=== Pseudoscience ===
Dowsing is considered to be a pseudoscience.

Psychologist David Marks in a 1986 article in Nature included dowsing in a list of "effects which until recently were claimed to be paranormal but which can now be explained from within orthodox science." Specifically, dowsing could be explained in terms of sensory cues, expectancy effects, and probability.

Science writer Peter Daempfle has noted that when dowsing is subjected to scientific testing, it fails. Daempfle has written that although some dowsers claim success, this can be attributed to the underground water table being distributed relatively uniformly in certain areas.

According to archaeologist Kenneth Feder, "the vast majority of archaeologists don't use dowsing, because they don't believe it works."

Psychologist Chris French has noted that "dowsing does not work when it is tested under properly controlled conditions that rule out the use of other cues to indicate target location."

Water dowsers often achieve good results because random chance has a high probability of finding water in favorable terrain.

== In popular culture ==
Dowsing rods have appeared in many forms of popular media, such as Coraline and Pokémon. It is often associated with ghostly or creepy themes and stories with superstitious elements. Other elements of popular media that reference dowsing rods include use of a dowsing pendulum by Professor Calculus in Tintin, appearing as a card in Magic: The Gathering, and appearing as a plot device multiple times in The Smurfs (1981). The protagonist of La Chimera (2023) uses dowsing to apprehend the location of ancient tombs.

== Notable dowsers ==
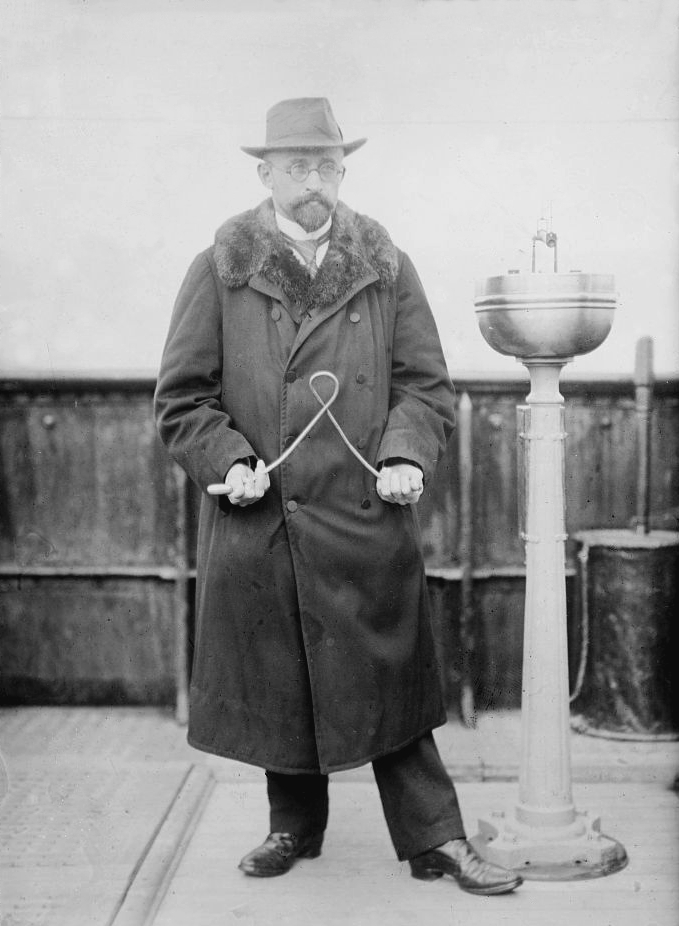
Otto Edler von Graeve in 1913

Notable dowsers include:

- Jacques Aymar-Vernay
- Moritz Benedikt
- Theodore Besterman
- Christopher Bird
- Manfred Curry
- Leicester Gataker
- Uri Geller
- A. Frank Glahn
- Otto Edler von Graeve
- Henry Gross
- Ernst Hartmann
- Christopher Hills
- T. C. Lethbridge
- J. Cecil Maby
- Faye Marlowe
- Larry R. Marshall
- Michel Moine
- Nils-Axel Mörner
- James Scott-Elliot
- Joseph Smith (in his early life)
- Oliver Cowdery
- Karl Spiesberger
- Ludwig Straniak
- Solco Walle Tromp
- Ralph Whitlock
- Professor Calculus
- Jeremy Clarkson

== See also ==
- Alpha 6 (device)
- Automatic writing
- Michel Eugène Chevreul
- Facilitated communication
- Fuji (planchette writing)
- Geobiology (pseudoscience)
- Geomancy
- Geopathology
- Ley line
- List of topics characterized as pseudoscience
- Long range locator
- Luopan
- One Million Dollar Paranormal Challenge
- Ouija
- Petrichor
- Radiesthesia
- Radionics
- Rhabdomancy
- Table-turning
- TR Araña
