= A. Frank Glahn =

German mystic and astrologer

A. Frank Glahn (1865–1941), was a German mystic, Germanic revivalist, and most notably a pendulum dowser. He was used by the German military in the Third Reich, not necessarily willingly.

Glahn was mentioned greatly in the book Reveal the Power of the Pendulum by Karl Spiesberger.

In 1920 A. Frank-Glahn's "Das Deutsche Tarot Buch" was published by Uranus Verlag, accompanied by a deck of cards "Deutsches Original Tarot", an Egyptian style deck, but unique. Glahn's book and cards became a German tarot bible, which survived up in the 1980s, published by Hermann Bauer Verlag. (K.Frank Jensen)

== Written works ==
- Das Deutsche Tarotbuch Die Lehre von Weissagung und ...
- Natürliche Kräfte und Strahlungen Pendellehre
- Erklärung und systematische Deutung des Geburtshoroskopes:
  - Die Kardinalauslösungen der Planeten
  - Die Arbeit mit dem Erdhoroskop
  - Die Handhabung der Spiegelpunkte
  - Die Berücksichtigung der 36 Häuserdekanate
  - Die Verwendung der Halbdistanzpunkte
  - Glahns Rhythmenlehre mit Rhythmen von 8 1/3, 6, 7 oder 25 Jahren pro Haus.
  - Der Glahnsche Lebenskreis
- Das Deutsche Tarotbuch, 1979, Bauer-Verlag, Freiburg
- Das Mutterschaftsmysterium enthüllt, 1930, Uranus-Verlag, Memmingen
- Die Begriffene Astrologie, 1933, Uranus-Verlag Memmingen
- Erklärung und systematische Deutung des Geburtshoroskops, 1924, Uranus-Verlag Max Duphorn, Bad Oldesloe
- Jedermanns Astrologie für das deutsche Volk, 1935, Uranus-Verlag Memmingen

Glahn also wrote many articles

== See also ==
- Nazi occultism
- Pendulum
- Dowsing
- Karl Spiesberger
