= Robert Scott Troup =

British forestry expert

Robert Scott Troup CMG CIE FRS (13 December 1874 – 1 October 1939) was a British forestry expert. He spent the first part of his career in Colonial India, returning to England in 1920 to head Oxford's School of Forestry.

== Education ==
Troup was educated at Aberdeen Grammar School and the University of Aberdeen. He then entered the Royal Indian Engineering College, based at Cooper's Hill, near Egham, Surrey. This trained engineers and forest conservators for the Indian service.

== Career ==
Troup joined the Imperial Forestry Service in 1897 and was posted to Burma as a deputy conservator of forests. In 1905, he was appointed forest economist at the new Imperial Forest Research Institute and College at Dehra Dun, India. In 1915, he was appointed assistant inspector-general of forests. In 1917–1918, he also served as controller of timber supplies with the Indian Munitions Board. He ended his Imperial Forestry Service career as inspector-general of forests of Burma.

In 1920, Troup returned to the United Kingdom to take up the chair of forestry at the University of Oxford, succeeding William Schlich, under whom he had studied at Cooper's Hill. Troup was elected a Fellow of St John's College, Oxford. From 1924 to 1935, he was founding director of Oxford's Imperial Forestry Institute. He was elected Fellow of the Royal Society (FRS) in 1926.

He was appointed Companion of the Order of the Indian Empire (CIE) in the 1920 New Year Honours and Companion of the Order of St Michael and St George (CMG) in 1934.

== Works ==
Troup's three-volume work The Silviculture of Indian Trees was published in 1921. He also wrote Indian Forest Utilisation, Pinus Longifolia, Silvicultural Systems, A Manual of Forest Mensuration, Forestry and State Control and Exotic Forest Trees in the British Empire (1932).
