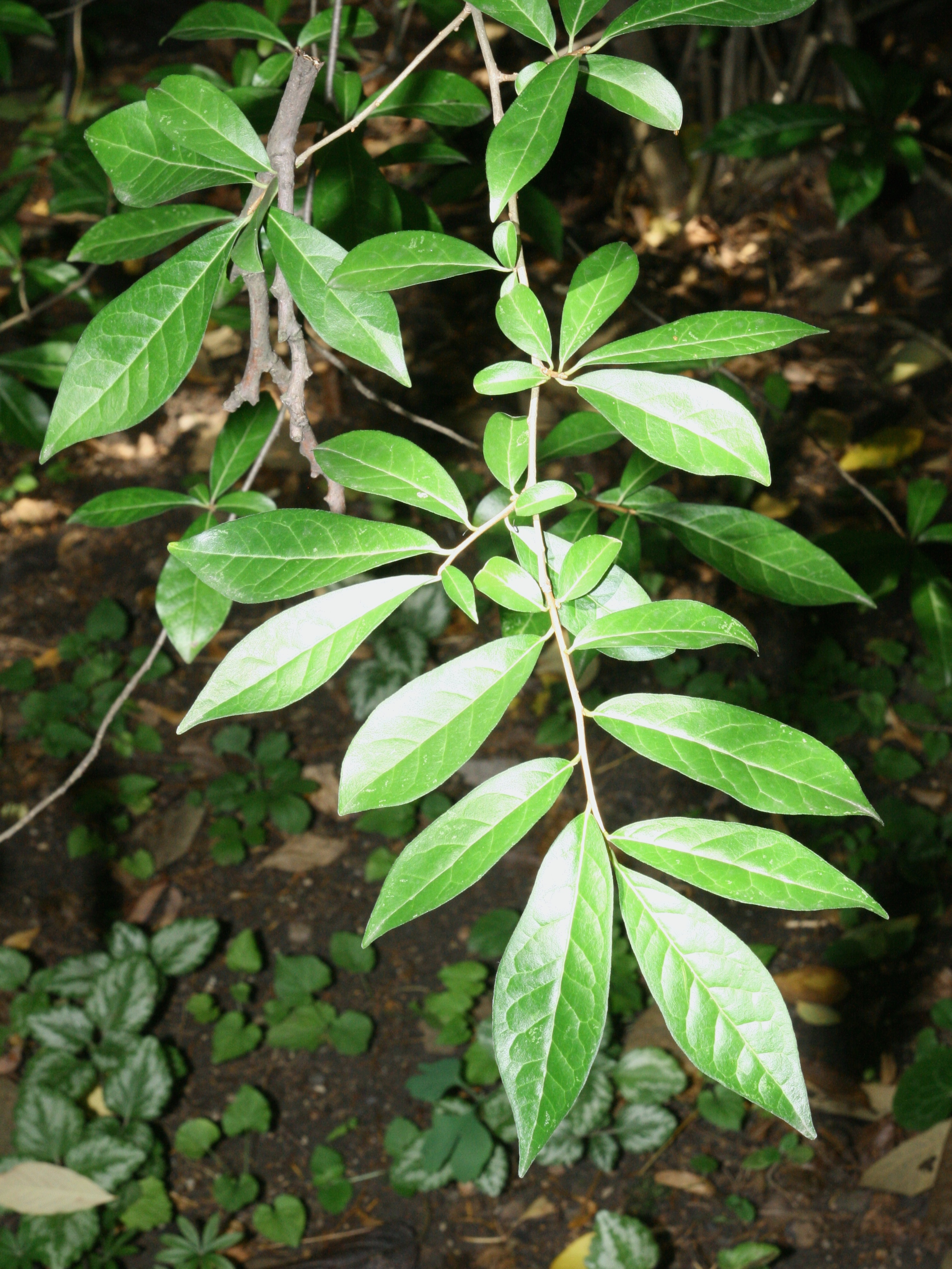
- Leaf arrangement
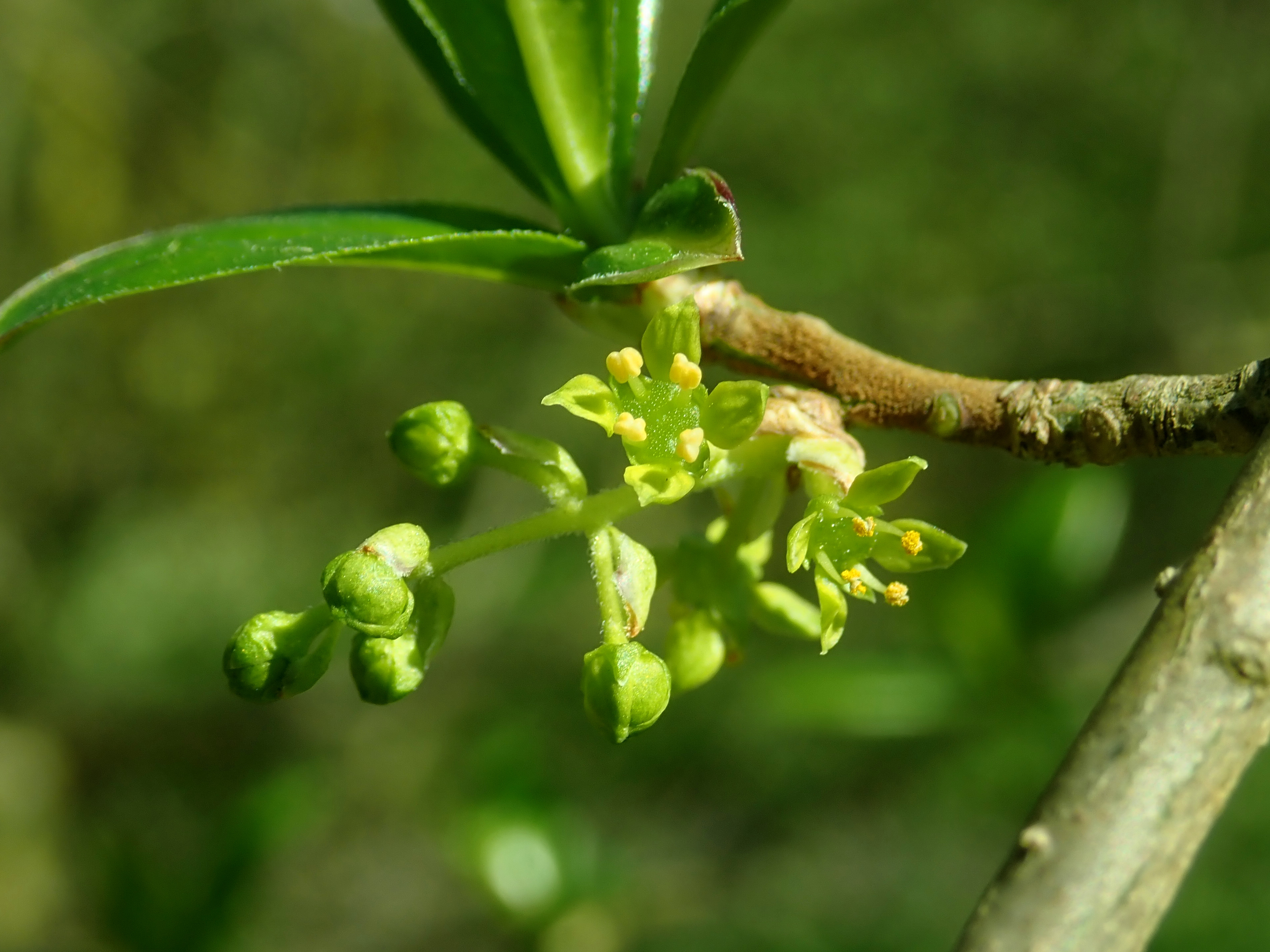
- Inflorescence

Scientific classification
- Kingdom: Plantae
- Clade: Tracheophytes
- Clade: Angiosperms
- Clade: Eudicots
- Clade: Rosids
- Order: Sapindales
- Family: Rutaceae
- Subfamily: Zanthoxyloideae
- Genus: Orixa; Thunb.
- Species: O. japonica

Binomial name
- Orixa japonica Thunb.

= Orixa japonica =

Species of shrub

Orixa japonica, commonly called East Asian orixa or Japanese orixa, is a deciduous shrub growing to 3 metres (10 ft) with an equal spread. Native to China, Japan and South Korea, it is found on forested, sunny slopes at elevations from 500 to 1300 m. A recent scientific study found this plant to contain previously unknown alkaloids that may be effective against Plasmodium falciparum, one of the protozoan species that cause human malaria.

This plant has an unusual and distinctive leaf pattern. Starting from the oldest leaf, the pattern of angles of subsequent leaves is 180 degrees, 90 degrees, 180 degrees, and 270 degrees. The pattern then repeats.

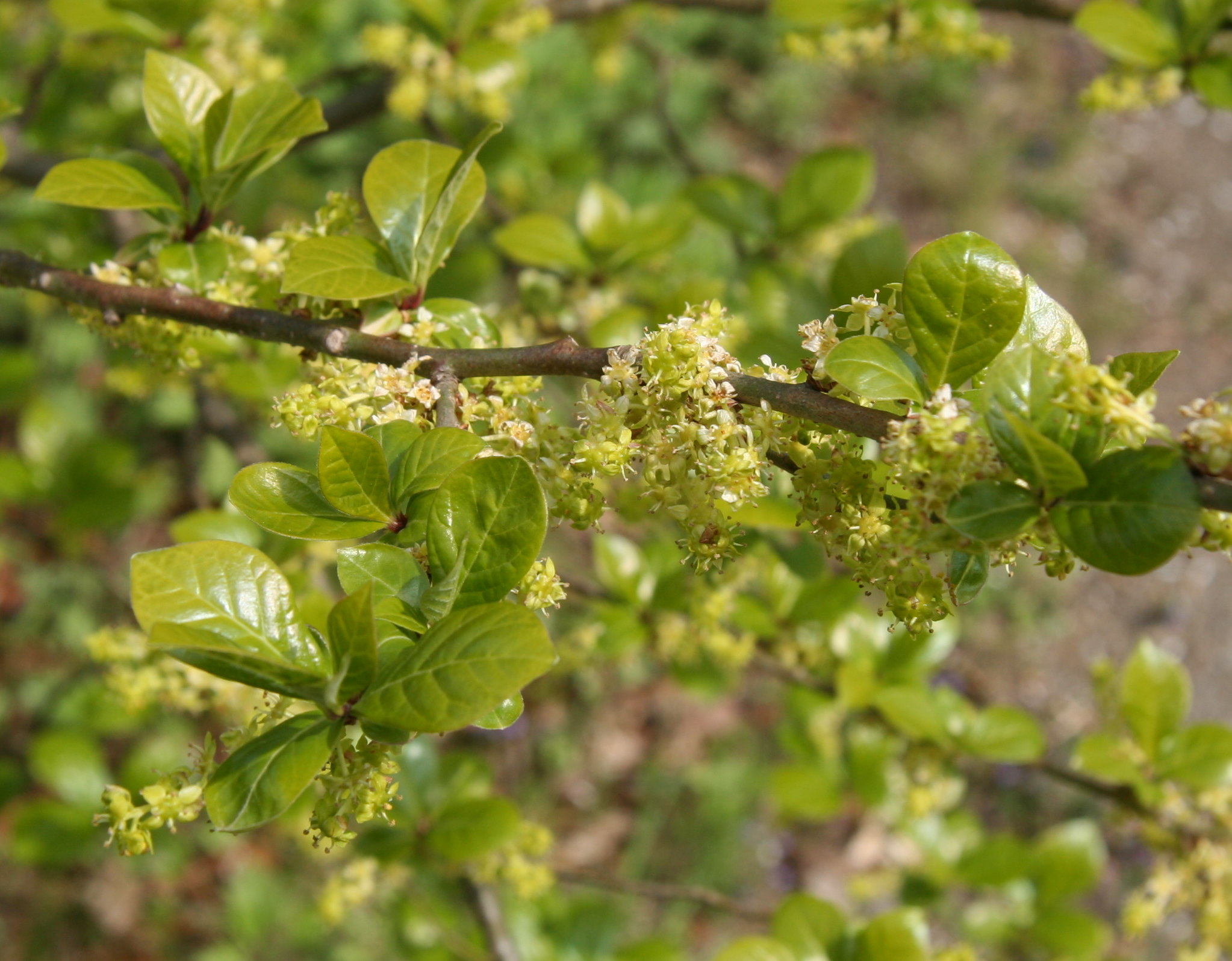
Flowers

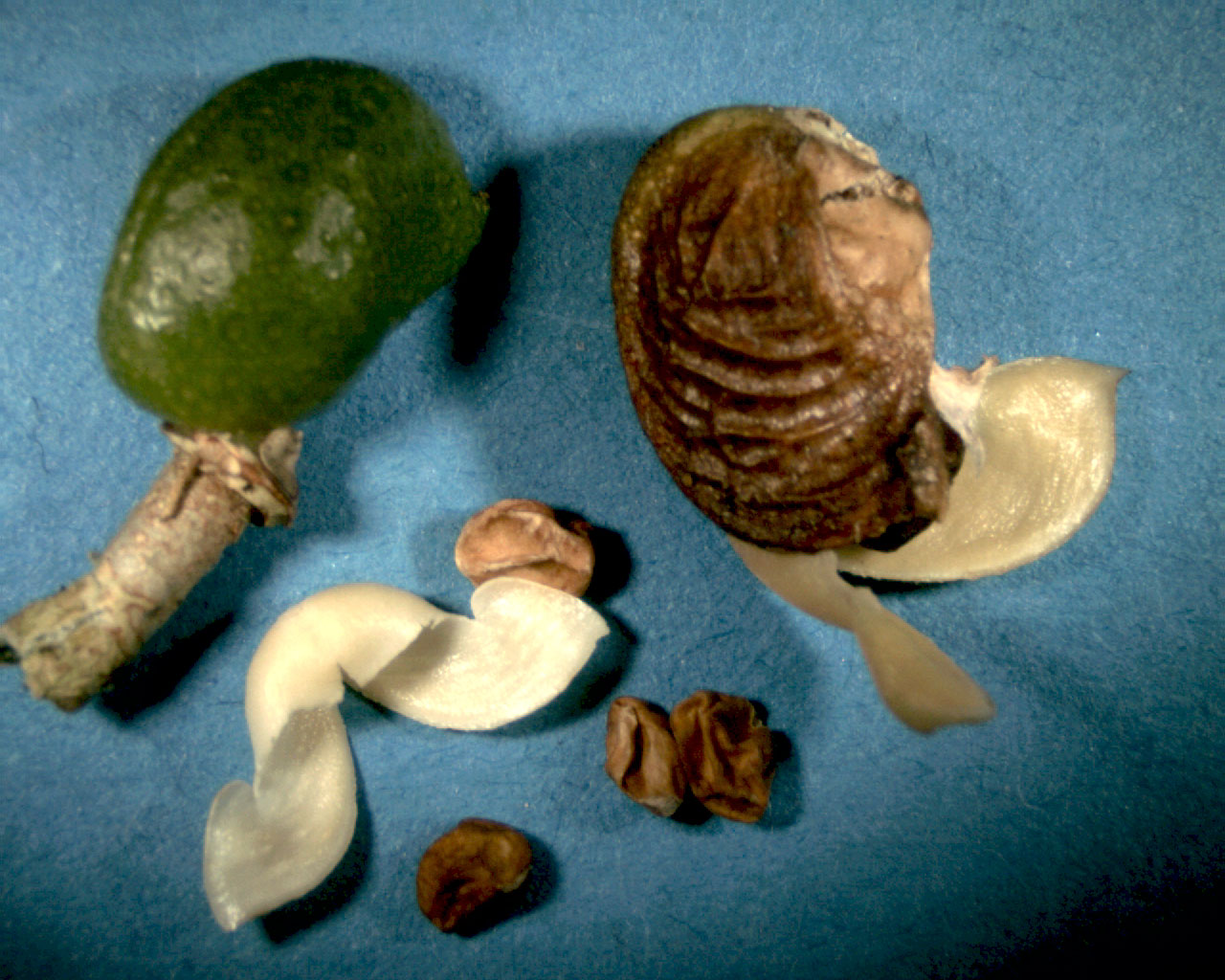
Fruit
