= International Journal of Biometeorology =

- Discipline: Biometeorology
- Language: English
- Edited by: Scott C. Sheridan

Publication details
- Publisher: Springer Science+Business Media
- Frequency: Bimonthly
- Impact factor: 3.787 (2020)

Standard abbreviations
- ISO 4: Int. J. Biometeorol.

Indexing
- CODEN: IJBMAO
- ISSN: 0020-7128 (print); 1432-1254 (web)
- LCCN: 72625755
- OCLC no.: 06745198

Links
- Journal homepage

The International Journal of Biometeorology is a peer-reviewed scientific journal which publishes original research papers, review articles, and short communications on studies examining the interactions between living organisms and factors of the natural and artificial physical environment. The journal is published by Springer Science+Business Media on behalf of the International Society of Biometeorology, its scope includes the fields of Earth and environmental science, life sciences, animal physiology, plant physiology and environmental medicine/environmental psychology.

== See also ==
  - List of scientific journals in earth and atmospheric sciences
  - List of scientific journals in biology
