= Ernst Hartmann =

German physician

Ernst Hartmann (born 10 November 1915 in Mannheim, d. 23 October 1992 in Waldkatzenbach, a suburb of Waldbrunn (Odenwald)) in Germany was a German medical doctor, author and publicist.

"Hartmann lines", a scientifically unproven grid of invisible energy lines of the Earth's inherent radiation (German Erdstrahlen), are named after him.

== Life ==
Ernst Hartmann studied medicine in Mannheim and Jena. During World War II he worked as a staff physician in the German army and later was briefly in American captivity. Subsequently, he opened a medical practice in Eberbach on the river Neckar, where he remained more than 40 years as a practitioner.

Besides his work as a doctor, in 1948, Ernst Hartmann occupied himself, together with his brother Robert, with geobiology and dowsing. Furthermore, he occupied himself with homeopathy and later also 'building biology' (German baubiologie). The Research Group for Geobiology (Dr. Hartmann e.V.), a registered association with the goal of promoting research and training in geobiology, was founded by him in 1961.

== Significant Publications ==
- Geopathie (eng. Geopathy), Haug Verlag, Ulm/Donau, 1954.
- Krankheit als Standortproblem (eng. Illness as a Location Problem), Volume 1, Haug Verlag, Heidelberg, (1. Auflage 1964), 5. Auflage 1986, ISBN 9783776006537
- Krankheit als Standortproblem (eng. Illness as a Location Problem), Volume 2, Haug Verlag, Heidelberg, 1986, ISBN 9783776009118

== See also ==
- Dowsing
- Radiesthesia
- Geopathology
