= Church House, Westminster =

Headquarters of the Church of England

Coordinates: 51°29′52″N 0°7′46″W

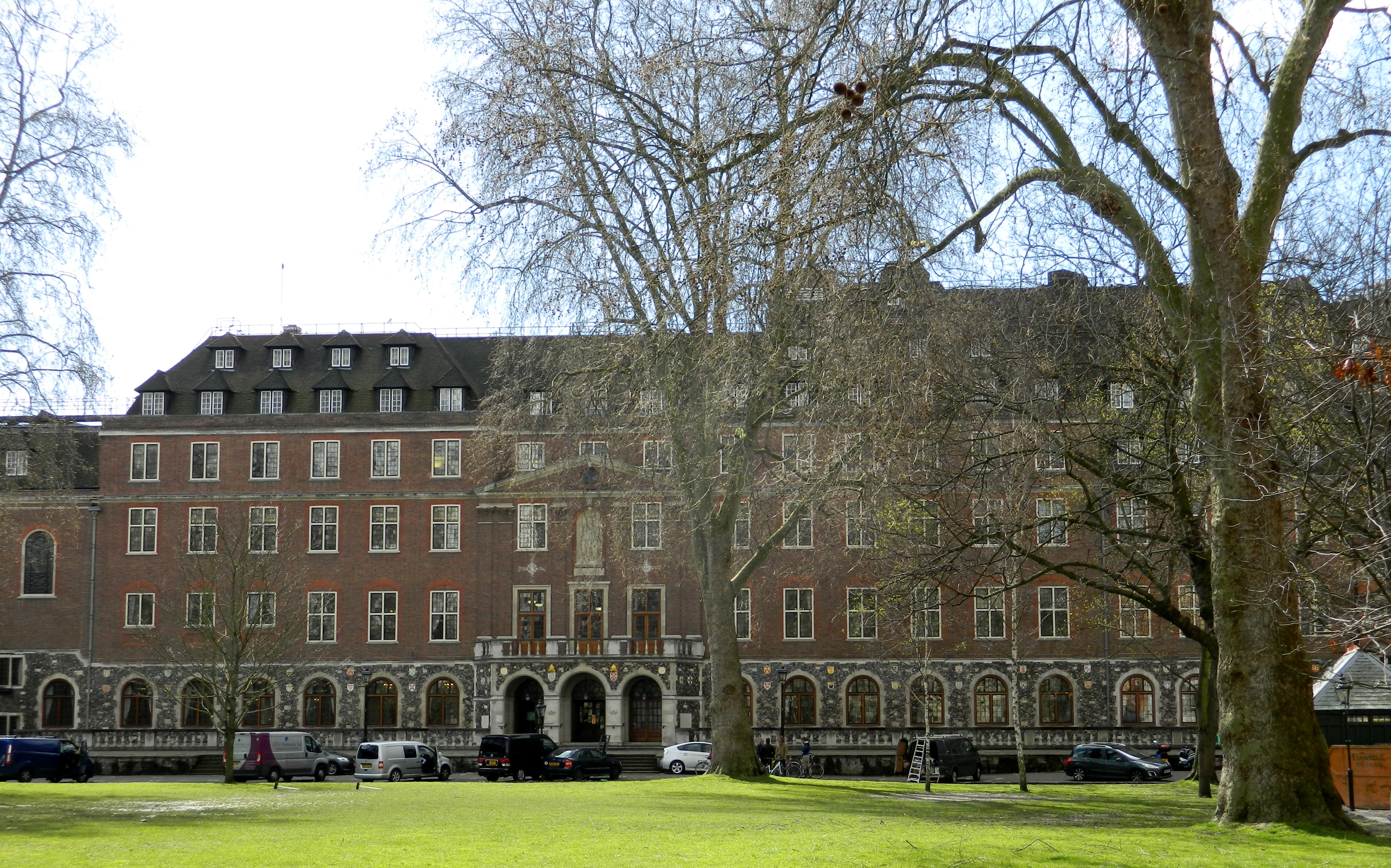
The Church House facade from Dean's Yard in 2016

The Church House is the home of the headquarters of the Church of England, occupying the south end of Dean's Yard next to Westminster Abbey in London. Besides providing administrative offices for the Church Commissioners, the Archbishops' Council and the Church of England Pensions Board, and a chamber for the General Synod, the building also provided a meeting place for the Parliament of the United Kingdom during the Second World War, and for some of the organs of the newly formed United Nations afterwards, including the first meeting of the United Nations Security Council. It has more recently been the venue for several notable public inquiries.

== Origins ==
The idea of a central meeting and administrative building for the Church of England had been raised twice in the mid 19th century and was finally acted upon in 1886 when Harvey Goodwin, Bishop of Carlisle, suggested in a letter to The Times that the Church should construct a "Church House" as a memorial of the Golden Jubilee of Queen Victoria. Accordingly, a charity called the Corporation of the Church House was founded by royal charter on 23 February 1888, with the aim of raising the necessary funds and executing the project.

A site was selected in Dean's Yard, close to Westminster Abbey and Westminster School. In 1888, sufficient funds had been raised to purchase the freehold on a block of buildings occupying the south side of Dean's Yard and bordered by Great Smith Street, Little Smith Street and Tufton Street. These buildings included the Westminster Free Library (which relocated to the other side of Great Smith Street) and a boarding house for pupils at Westminster School. The leases on 10 and 11 Dean's Yard could be purchased outright and these became the offices of several other Anglican societies, and were inaugurated as the first Church House on 21 July 1888.

== Church House (1896) ==
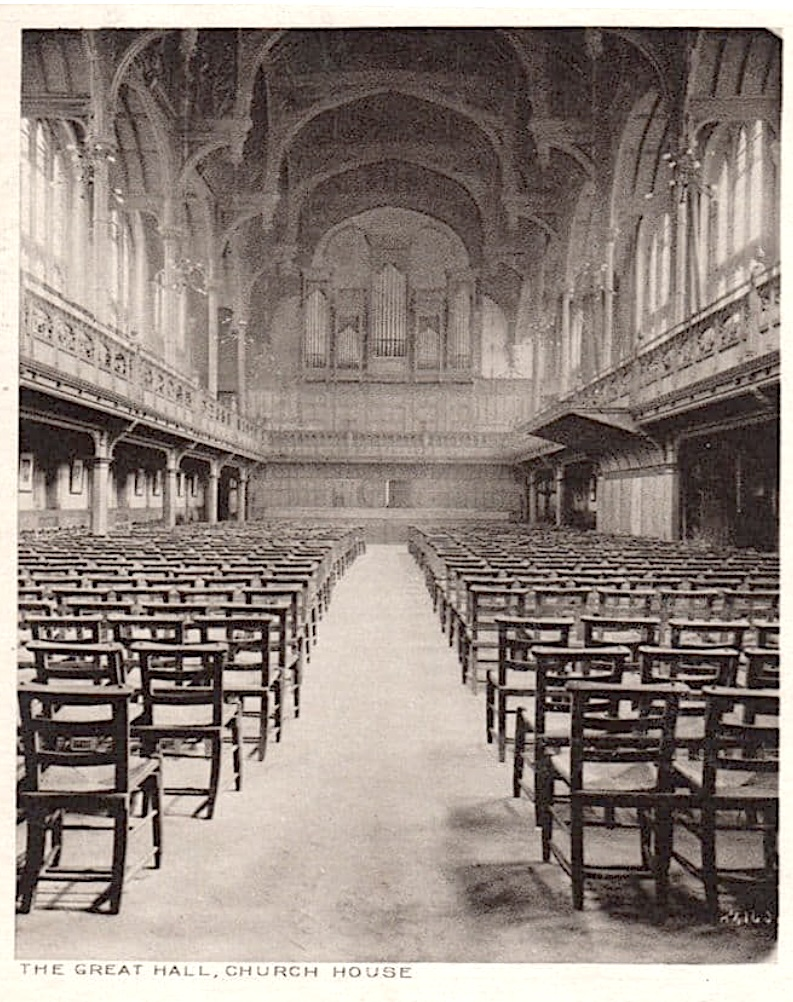
Great Hall, Church House, Westminster

In November 1889, Sir Arthur Blomfield was selected to design the new building which was intended to occupy the whole site; the south façade of his plans bore some resemblance to Hampton Court Palace. Meanwhile, difficulties with fund raising and obtaining the leases of buildings on the site caused a considerable delay. The first part of the project was the Great Hall on the south of the site, the foundation stone for which was laid on 24 June 1891 by Prince Arthur, Duke of Connaught, and was opened on 11 February 1896 by Prince George, Duke of York. From 1899 the Great Hall contained a fine three-manual pipe-organ by the London firm of T. C. Lewis; the gift of the Hon. Richard Strutt.

Fund raising for the western block of the project was quickly under way; which was to include a library and a hall for meetings of the Convocation of Canterbury. This hall was to be named after Henry Hoare, who had been instrumental in the revival of the Convocation in 1852 (its first meeting since 1717). The hall was opened by Frederick Temple, Archbishop of Canterbury, on 28 January 1902. The rest of Blomfield's projected building was never completed.

== Church House (present) ==
Church House (Westminster) Act 1934
- Act of Parliament
- Parliament of the United Kingdom
- Long title: An Act to confirm and to enable effect to be given to an agreement for exchanging and otherwise dealing with certain properties in Dean's Yard, Westminster, for the purpose of enlarging and rebuilding the Church House, and for purposes connected therewith.
- Citation: 24 & 25 Geo. 5. c. xxiv

Dates
- Royal assent: 17 May 1934

The current building, designed by Sir Herbert Baker, is a 1930s replacement of the original building. Its construction was authorised by an act of Parliament, the Church House (Westminster) Act 1934 (24 & 25 Geo. 5. c. xxiv). Though delayed at first by the depression of the early 1930s, the foundation stone was laid by Queen Mary on 26 June 1937, and the building was officially opened by King George VI on 10 June 1940. The Assembly Hall had a three-manual pipe-organ built by The John Compton Organ Company of London.

After the building's Assembly Hall was directly hit during the Blitz and yet suffered little damage, apart from irreparably damaging the pipe-organ, the building was requisitioned for use as a chamber for the House of Lords.

The first meeting of the United Nations General Assembly was held in Methodist Central Hall, Westminster, on 10 January 1946. The United Nations Security Council met for the first time a week later, 17 January 1946, in Church House.

In 1947 it was the venue for the fifth British Empire Forestry Conference.

Today, the building is the headquarters of the Archbishops' Council, the Church Commissioners and all its boards and councils (since 2007), as well as of the Church of England Pensions Board and the National Society. It is the meeting-place of the General Synod of the Church of England each February (alternating with York in July) and for special and inaugural sessions, usually in November. Areas of the building are available on a private hire basis for conferences and events.

The Church House is also the meeting-place of the Annual Bond Solon Expert Witness Conference each November, which is the largest gathering of expert witnesses in the UK.

The building was made a Grade II listed building in 1988, and is currently used as a conference centre when the general synod is not in session.

In December 2020, the Church House hosted two boxing events organised by boxing promoter Frank Warren and headlined by Daniel Dubois v Joe Joyce and Anthony Yarde v Lyndon Arthur on the following weekend. There were no spectators due to the Coronavirus pandemic.

== Bibliography ==
- "The Church House 1888–1988 – A Moment in the Life of the Church". The Corporation of the Church House. 1988. Archived from the original on 14 June 2011.
- Baker, Herbert (1940). "The Church House – Its Art and Symbolism". The Corporation of the Church House. Archived from the original on 24 July 2008.
