= Otto Edler von Graeve =

German divining rod proponent (1872–1948)

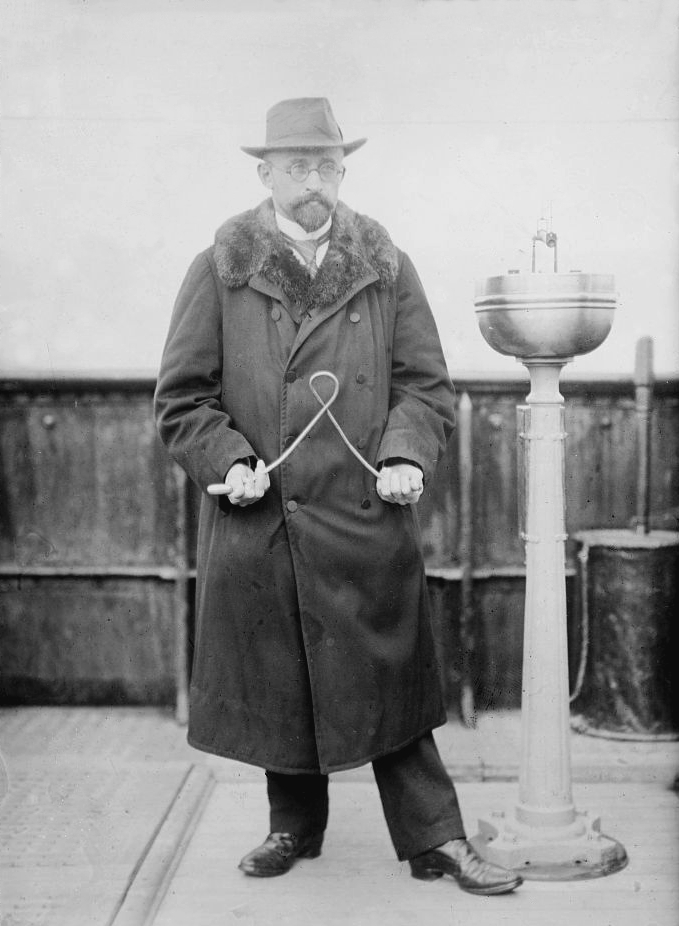
- von Graeve in 1913
- Born: 22 July 1872; Gotteswalde
- Died: 10 January 1948 (aged 75); Heidelberg
- Known for: Dowsing
- Spouse: Elsbeth Schrey (m. 1902)

Otto Edler von Graeve (22 July 1872 – 10 January 1948) was a German divining rod proponent.

== Biography ==
He was born on 22 July 1872 to Emil Edler von Graeve (1826–1904), lord of Gotteswalde and Neuhof. Otto von Graeve served in the Prussian army, achieving the rank of Major before he settled in the small town of Gernrode in Anhalt. In 1913, he published a manuscript on dowsing, Meine Wünschelrutentätigkeit. Beobachtungen in Theorie und Praxis nebst einem Anhang: Anerkennungen, Protokoll sämtlicher Schürfungen bis 31. December 1912 und Statistik (My dowsing activity: Observations in theory and practice along with an appendix acknowledgments, minutes of all excavations to December 31, 1912 and statistics).

He visited the United States on 27 January 1914 aboard the USS George Washington, passing through New York City on his way to Vancouver Island to divine for radium. He also spent time dowsing in the Sinai Peninsula and in Palestine. The Deutsche Levante-Zeitung reported in November 1915 that von Graeve had dowsed for water at the German temple colony, on the property of the Auguste Viktoria Foundation on the Mount of Olives and on that of a Syrian orphanage.

In 1918, von Graeve is said to have found a mineral spring on the Schwedderberg near Gernrode, allegedly by using a divining rod, which was then used for the local outdoor pool. The town of Gernrode then had three bathing establishments, namely the Osterteich, the Schraderbad and the Ottobad, the latter discovered by and named after von Graeve.

It was reported that during geological explorations undertaken in Thermalbad Wiesenbad between 1919 and 1921 von Graeve was present as a representative of the company Meyer und Co. and, in May 1920 he used his dowsing rod (through a bore hole made by the engineer Röttinger from Halle) to discover a spring that was 25 °C (77 °F), erupted 5.2 metres (17 ft) initially on tapping and produced 210 litres (55 US gal) per minute.

Because of his reported successes, in 1920 he was commissioned by the city of Reutlingen to assist with drilling for a water source. After drilling in vain to a depth of 126 meters at the site von Graeve had indicated, he was expelled from the site.

Von Graeve married Elsbeth Schrey on 1 April 1902 in Danzig and they had seven children (four sons and three daughters).

== Graeve's explanation of dowsing ==
In 1914, as part of an interview and demonstration given to The Sun in New York von Graeve explained dowsing as follows:

"So far as it can be determined now I am susceptible to radioactivity to the alpha, beta and gamma rays discovered by Herz [sic]... Our present guess is that there is a continuous current of these alpha, beta, gamma and other rays—radioactive waves—flowing up from underground. Where there is water, oil, gold, silver, or other mineral under the earth’s surface the flow up of the radioactive waves is disturbed. Either it is stopped entirely, or the waves are swung out of their course. That is because water, oil and the minerals are nonconductors of these waves."

He demonstrated his dowsing by detecting a gold 10-mark coin which he placed first on the carpet and then on a chair. He used a bent iron rod and when he approached the coin the "rod whipped over and struck his safety belt a hard thump." When a visitor attempted the same feat nothing happened. When the visitor held one end of the rod and von Graeve the other the rod bent towards the coin but not as violently as before.

The motion of such dowsing devices is generally attributed to the ideomotor phenomenon, a psychological response where a subject makes motions unconsciously. The scientific evidence is that dowsing is no more effective than random chance and it therefore regarded as a pseudoscience.

Von Graeve also detected the presence of what he believed to be water pipes within the second floor of the building in which the interview took place. Whether there was anything there or whether the pipes were electrical conduit was not confirmed.

During the interview von Graeve also claimed to have done 402 dowsings with a 93.12% success rate.

== Publications ==
- Bestätigungen über erfolgreiche Schürfungen vermittelst der Wünschelrute des Rutengängers [Confirmations of successful prospecting are given by the dowser's dowsing rod] (1911)
- Graeve, Otto Edler von (1911). Die Wünschelrute und ihre Anwendung in der Praxis [The dowsing rod and its application in practice] (in German).
- Meine Wünschelrutentätigkeit. Beobachtungen in Theorie und Praxis nebst einem Anhang: Anerkennungen, Protokoll sämtlicher Schürfungen bis 31. December 1912 und Statistik [My dowsing activity: Observations in theory and practice along with an appendix acknowledgments, minutes of all excavations to December 31, 1912 and statistics] (in German). 1913.
- Hildesheim (1914)
- Behörden und Wünschelrute [Authorities and dowsing] (1921)
- Auszug aus den Erfolgen meiner Wünschelrutentätigkeit von 1910 bis 1928 [Excerpt from the successes of my dowsing activity from 1910 to 1928] Padelt, Gernrode (1928)
- Graeve, Otto Edler von (1939). Referenzen über Wunschelrutenerfolge: Mit Berücksichtigung grosser Wassergiebigkeit für Gemeinden... [Sammlung von Sonderdrucken, Briefkopien etc.] [References about successes in divining rods: With consideration of large water yield for communities... [Collection of offprints, letter copies etc.].] (in German).
