= Jacques Aymar-Vernay =

French dowser (born 1662)

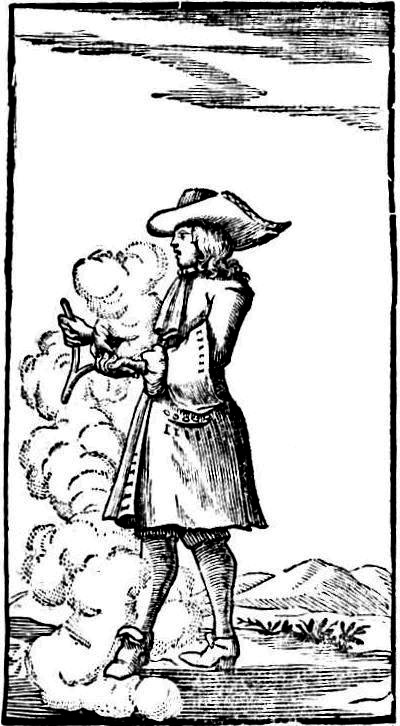
Aymar-Vernay dowsing with a divining rod.

Jacques Aymar-Vernay (born in 1662) was a stonemason from the village of Saint Marcellin in Dauphiné, France, who reintroduced dowsing with a divining rod into popular usage in Europe. He claimed to have discovered springs and treasures hiding in the earth using his rod, and even tracked down criminals using it. According to some accounts, when he neared the scene of a murder using a divining rod, he would break into a sweat, shudder and, in some instances, even faint.

In 1692, Aymar-Vernay was hired by authorities to locate a murderer. By swinging a pendulum he identified a 19-year-old boy, a hunchback, as the culprit. The boy was subsequently "broken on the wheel" (torturously executed). Aymar subsequently became something of a national celebrity for his "ability". When submitting to testing by Prince de Condé, however, he failed every single test.
