= Leicester Gataker =

English water finder (1874–1942)

Leicester Gataker

Leicester Gataker (1874–1942) was an English professional water diviner, or water finder.

At the end of the 19th century very few people had running water and the skills of a dowser were taken seriously. As an example the Sea - Copse - Hill Estate, Whippingham on the Isle of Wight was sold by auction at Ryde on 20 July 1899. The auction particulars at the time contained the following details:

"Mr. Leicester Gataker, the well-known Water-finder expert, has reported his opinion upon the three fields forming lots 6, 8, 10, 11, which the Auctioneers submit may reasonably be considered as representative of the water existing under the whole estate."

== Early life and career ==
Melmoth Leicester Swale Gataker was born in Bath, England in 1874. He was the son of Captain Melmoth Gataker of the Bengal Staff Corps. He was educated at Bath College and might have spent his life in a London office if he had not discovered his ability as a Water Finder. He had contemplated joining the church but his health prevented this. He started dowsing in the 1890s and was based originally in Weston Super Mare.

He was sufficiently confident of his abilities that he was prepared to work on the basis of “No Water, No Pay.” A letter to the Chatsworth Estate in Derbyshire dated 23 February 1895 sets out these terms on which he was prepared to be engaged As a result, he visited Pentrich Farm on 21 March 1895. The outcome is recorded in a letter from the estate dated 22 June 1895:

"You stated that you believed we should find water at a depth at a depth of between 60 and 70 feet. We found a supply at 69 feet and there is every probability that it will be sufficient for the requirements of the farm. You are no doubt aware that we had before sunk a well to a considerable depth without success. I was much surprised to find that you first indicated the locality of the water with your hands and no rod, only using the rod as a secondary aid to confirm your indication."

Alfred William Wills

This correspondence and other letters like it are used by Leicester Gataker to produce a brochure in 1901 called The Water Under the Earth to promote his business.

In the brochure Leicester Gataker has an assistant, a Mr A W Wills. Alfred William Wills was the son of another Alfred Wills and their business was Alfred Wills & Son, a plumbing business. Alfred first met Leicester Gataker in 1896. The partnership enabled Leicester Gataker to provide the actual water extraction in addition to the dowsing. The work included overseas contracts. Gataker was engaged by the Aboukir Company in Egypt and took Alfred along. Alfred would be paid £100 for six weeks’ work. They were successful in Egypt and their reputation was such that they were asked to do further work for His Highness the Khedive, Abbas II in Cairo. Although originally only a supplier of plumbing Alfred William Wills would also become a dowser in his own right.

Alfred William Wills continued successfully with his plumbing and building business and was an influential figure in Liberal Party politics. However he did not continue with the water finding part of the business. His obituary in the Bath Chronicle in 1949 contains the following:

"Ambitious he induced his father to add the provision of water supplies to a growing general business. The result was that he carried out big contracts abroad as well as over Great Britain."

There is no mention of the part Leicester Gataker played in this, or indeed of Leicester Gataker anywhere in the article. It would appear that by the time of his death the part that dowsing had paid in the creation of his fortunes was not something that would be advertised.

== Ampthill Affair ==
Leicester Gataker estimated his failure rate at 10%. The most widely reported unsuccessful case concerned the Ampthill Urban District Council in Bedfordshire.

Ampthill like many other boroughs had a perennial problem of obtaining good regular water supplies. The local wells were inadequate and typhoid was a problem. In 1896 the Local Government Board ordered the council to provide an adequate water supply. In July of that year the council rejected the advice given by the county’s geologist and turned instead to Leicester Gataker. He divined water in a field belonging to a Mr Fountaine of Little Park Farm. Trial borings began in that field and in March 1897 Leicester was called back again to re-locate the springs.

In 1897 and again in 1898 several ratepayers objected to the payment to Leicester Gataker for water divining. The Local Government auditor for Bedfordshire, Mr William A Casson upheld those objections and surcharged the council for those fees. That meant that unless they appealed successfully, whichever councillors had authorised the fees would have to pay them personally. The fees in themselves were not great: £13 8s 7d for one year and £17 13s 6d for the second. However the reasons given for refusing could have been catastrophic to Leicester Gataker and all other water diviners if they had been upheld. The auditor in announcing his first decision in 1897 stated that:

"In seeking for water the district council have disregarded the reports of experts and have gone for guidance to a man who has a reputation for discovering water by some unusual or peculiar method not possible to ordinary persons. The question I have to settle is whether this is legal or not."

In coming to his second decision in 1899 William Casson read the monograph written by Professor Barrett on Divining Rods in the Proceedings of the Society of Psychical Research which is generally favourable to dowsing. However he went on to say:

"Professor Barrett admits that their general ideas of water are absurd, as they imagine springs exist like buried treasure, located to an area of a few square inches, or as underground rivers which they profess to trace within an inch on either side. Mr Gataker had with a view to obtaining the fee paid to him by the council, made pretence to a power within the meaning of the decision in the case of “Reg v Maria Giles”, in which it was held that, “The pretence of a power, either physical, moral, or supernatural, and the obtaining money by the false assertion of such a power, whatever it may be, is an indictable offence.” The consideration in the agreement for Mr Gataker’s employment was therefore an illegal one, and the agreement for such employment void in law."

This was extremely serious, because on its worst construction it meant that Leicester Gataker had committed a criminal offence for which he could be prosecuted. Maria Giles was known in Bedfordshire as “the canning woman” and in February 1868 she was prosecuted for “pretended witchcraft.”

William Casson regarded divination as a survival from times when magic and witchcraft were generally believed in. He went on to say:

Where the practice of divination is not deliberately fraudulent it is perhaps explicable on the hypothesis of self-deception, and the fact that where scientific tests are applied to diviners the experiments generally fail shows that much depends on what an eminent geologist who had written to me described as the use of an eye trained to notice the surface features of the ground.

In the event the councillors did appeal to the Local Government Board and that appeal was successful. To ensure this was reported in The Times, Leicester Gataker sent the paper a copy of the report from the Leighton Buzzard Reporter of 5 November 1898. The Board gave the following reasons:

"1. The Board do not consider that it has been proved that Mr Gataker committed an indictable offence; or that, if he did so the members of the district council were aware that his pretences were illegal.
"AND
"2. The Board cannot but consider the action of the district council as unwise, but it does appear to them, having regard to the recommendations the council received as to Mr Gataker’s capabilities, that the council can be considered as having acted with such recklessness that the disallowance and surcharge can be confirmed."

A later article in The Times reports the answer given by the President of the Local Government Board to a question in Parliament on 7 August 1899. The question is whether or not the appeals had been allowed and if so could water diviners be legally employed at the cost of the rates. The reply refers to the two appeals from Ampthill and Mr Chaplin, the member for Sleaford in Lincolnshire goes on to say:

"The Board did not deem it necessary to consult the law officers of the Crown on the case. They were advised by their own legal adviser that the reasons assigned by the auditor for making the disallowance did not support the action he took in point of law."

In the end the decision in the Ampthill case, however it was arrived at, proved entirely favourable to the water diviners. As a consequence water finders such as the firm of John Mullins & Sons were being employed by local councils well into the 20th century.

== Later life ==
Leicester Gataker married Annie Madeline Young on 14 February 1899. After honeymooning on the Continent they returned to Charlton House in Weston Super Mare. By 1904 however they had moved to Bournemouth where Leicester Gataker would live for the rest of his life.

In a letter to The Times in 1905 he set out his history of success as proof of his good faith and repeated the terms upon which he was willing to do business. He also wrote about how water divining had affected his health:

To get through the amount of water-finding I have done few would believe the strain there is on the nervous system owing to the great concentration involved. I know only too well what this means, inasmuch as I had three years of acute neurosis due entirely to the amount of water-finding I have had to do, and I am not the only one whose health has been in some way or another affected.

— The Times, 21 January 1905; pg. 14; Issue 37610; col D

He died after a long illness in 1942.
