= International Society of Biometeorology =

International scientific organization

The International Society of Biometeorology (ISB) is a professional society for scientists interested in biometeorology, specifically environmental and ecological aspects of the interaction of the atmosphere and biosphere. The organization's stated purpose is: "to provide one international organization for the promotion of interdisciplinary collaboration of meteorologists, physicians, physicists, biologists, climatologists, ecologists and other scientists and to promote the development of Biometeorology".

The International Society of Biometeorology was founded in 1956 at UNESCO headquarters in Paris, France, by S. W. Tromp, a Dutch geologist, H. Ungeheuer, a German meteorologist, and several human physiologists of which F. Sargent II of the United States became the first President of the society.

ISB affiliated organizations include: the International Association for Urban Climate, the International Society for Agricultural Meteorology, the International Union of Biological Sciences, the World Health Organization, and the World Meteorological Organization. ISB affiliate members include: the American Meteorological Society, the Centre for Renewable Energy Sources, the German Meteorological Society, the Society for the Promotion of Medicine-Meteorological Research e.V., International Society of Medical Hydrology and Climatology, and the UK Met Office.

== Publications ==
ISB publishes the following journals:

- Bulletin of the Society of Biometeorology
- International Journal of Biometeorology
