= Rhabdomancy =

Divination technique

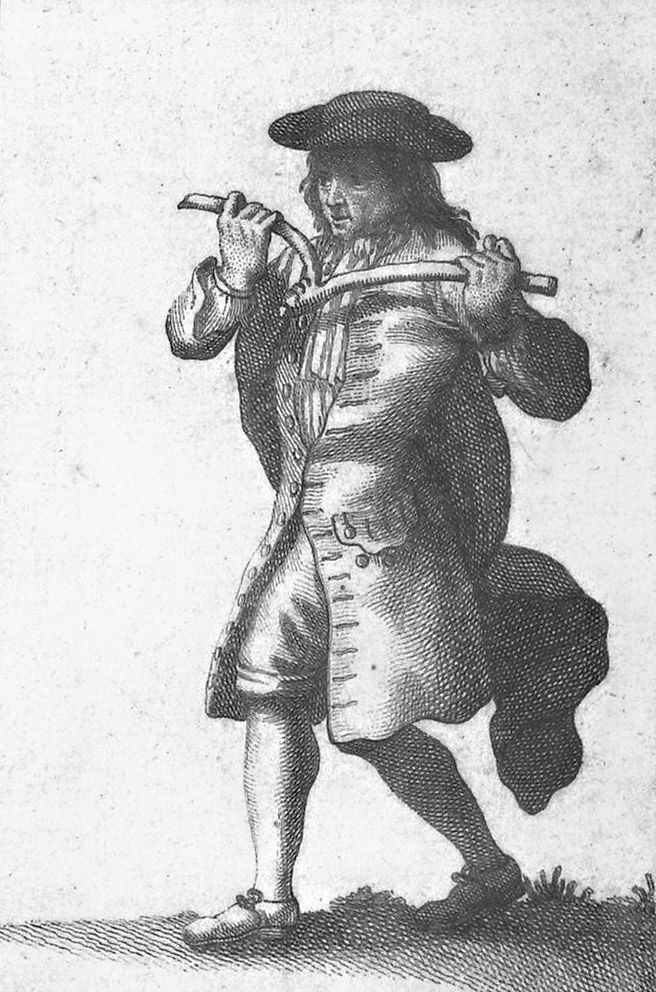
A dowser at work, (Jean-Frederic Bernard,1733–1736)

Rhabdomancy is a divination technique which involves the use of any rod, wand, staff, stick, arrow, or the like.

One method of rhabdomancy was setting a number of staffs on end and observing where they fall, to divine the direction one should travel, or to find answers to certain questions. It has also been used for divination by arrows (which have wooden shafts)—otherwise known as belomancy. Less commonly it has been assigned to the I Ching, which traditionally uses a bundle of yarrow shoots. Another type of rhabdomancy is dowsing in its traditional form of using a wooden stick, usually forked.

Rhabdomancy has been used in reference to a number of Biblical verses. St Jerome connected Hosea 4:12, which reads "My people ask counsel at their stocks, and their staff declareth unto them" (KJV), to Ancient Greek rhabdomantic practices. Thomas Browne, in his Pseudodoxia Epidemica, notes that Ezekiel 21:21 describes the divination by arrows of Nebuchadnezzar II as rhabdomancy, though this can also be termed belomancy. Numbers 17 has also been attributed to rhabdomancy.

W. F. Kirby, an English translator of the Kalevala, notes that in Runo 49, Väinämöinen uses rhabdomancy, or divination by rods, to learn where the Sun and Moon are hidden, but this interpretation is rejected by Aili Kolehmainen Johnson (1950).

== Etymology ==
The word first appears in English in the mid-17th century (used in Thomas Browne's Pseudodoxia Epidemica, 1646), where it is an adaptation of Late Latin rhabdomantia, from a presumed (unrecorded) ancient Greek *rhabdomanteia, from the ancient Greek ῥάβδος (rhabdos) a rod. Liddell & Scott are "dubious" about the word's existence in Classical Greek, though the word is well attested in Patristic Greek. Note that none of the divinatory practices denoted by rhabdomancy in English are documented from ancient Greek sources.
