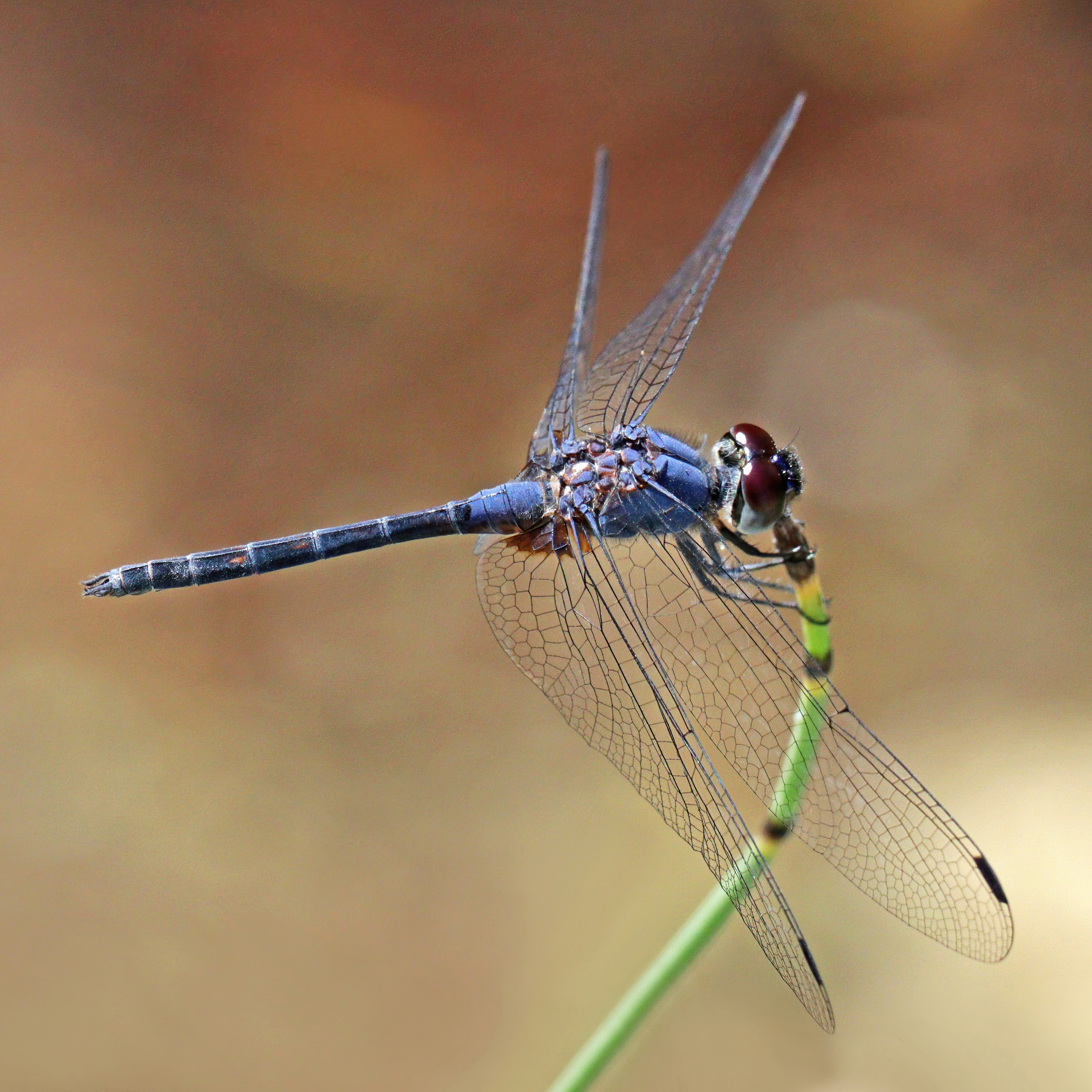
- Male in Cyprus

Conservation status
- Least Concern (IUCN 3.1)

Scientific classification
- Kingdom: Animalia
- Phylum: Arthropoda
- Class: Insecta
- Order: Odonata
- Infraorder: Anisoptera
- Family: Libellulidae
- Genus: Trithemis
- Species: T. festiva

Binomial name
- Trithemis festiva (Rambur, 1842)

Synonyms
- Libellula infernalis Brauer, 1865; Trithemis prosperina Selys, 1878

= Black stream glider =

Species of dragonfly

The black stream glider (Trithemis festiva), also known as the indigo dropwing is a species of dragonfly in the family Libellulidae. It is a very widespread species, occurring from Greece, Cyprus and Turkey, throughout Asia to New Guinea.

== Description ==
Black stream glider is a medium-sized dragonfly with purple color on its body structure.

In the male, the frontal area appears darker purplish grey. The eyes are dark brown above, with a purple colored tinge, which is bluish grey, lateral and beneath. The thorax is black, covered with purple pruinescence, which helps it appear deep blue. The legs are black and wings are transparent with a dark opaque brown mark at the base of hind wing, with a black spot on tip of the wing. The abdomen is covered with fine blue pruinescence.

The female looks brown in the front and extends above. The eyes are dark brown above and appear more grey-ish below. Thorax is greenish-yellow to olivaceous, with the presence of a medial dark brown lateral stripe. In addition, a Y-shaped inverted stripes can be observed on the sides. Legs are black with anterior femora being yellow on the inner side. Wings are transparent with dark reddish-brown tip with a black spot, similar to the male. The abdomen appears bright yellow with medial, lateral and ventral stripes, colored black, however, the medial and lateral black stripes form a confluence at abdominal segments to enclose a wedge-shaped yellow spot.

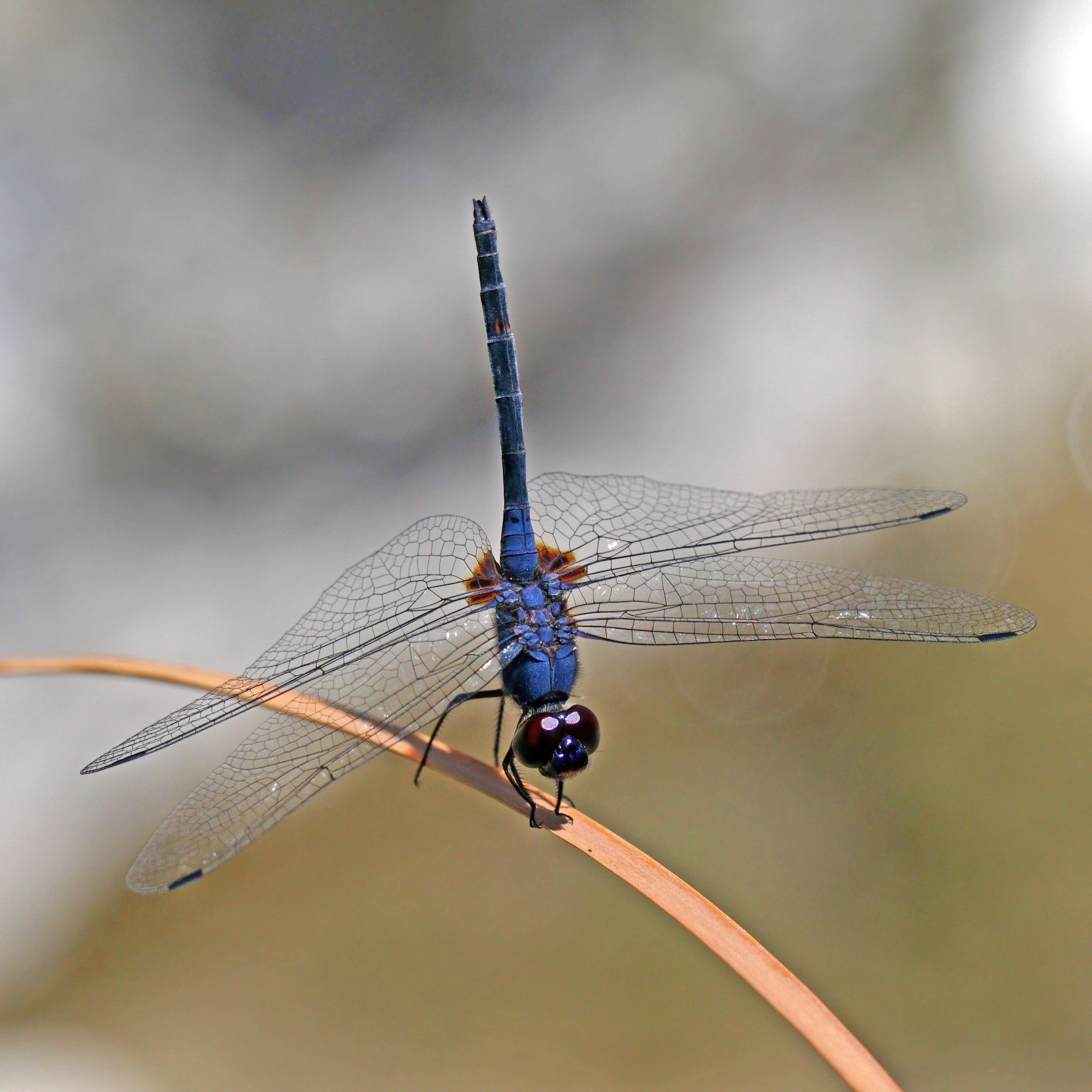
male

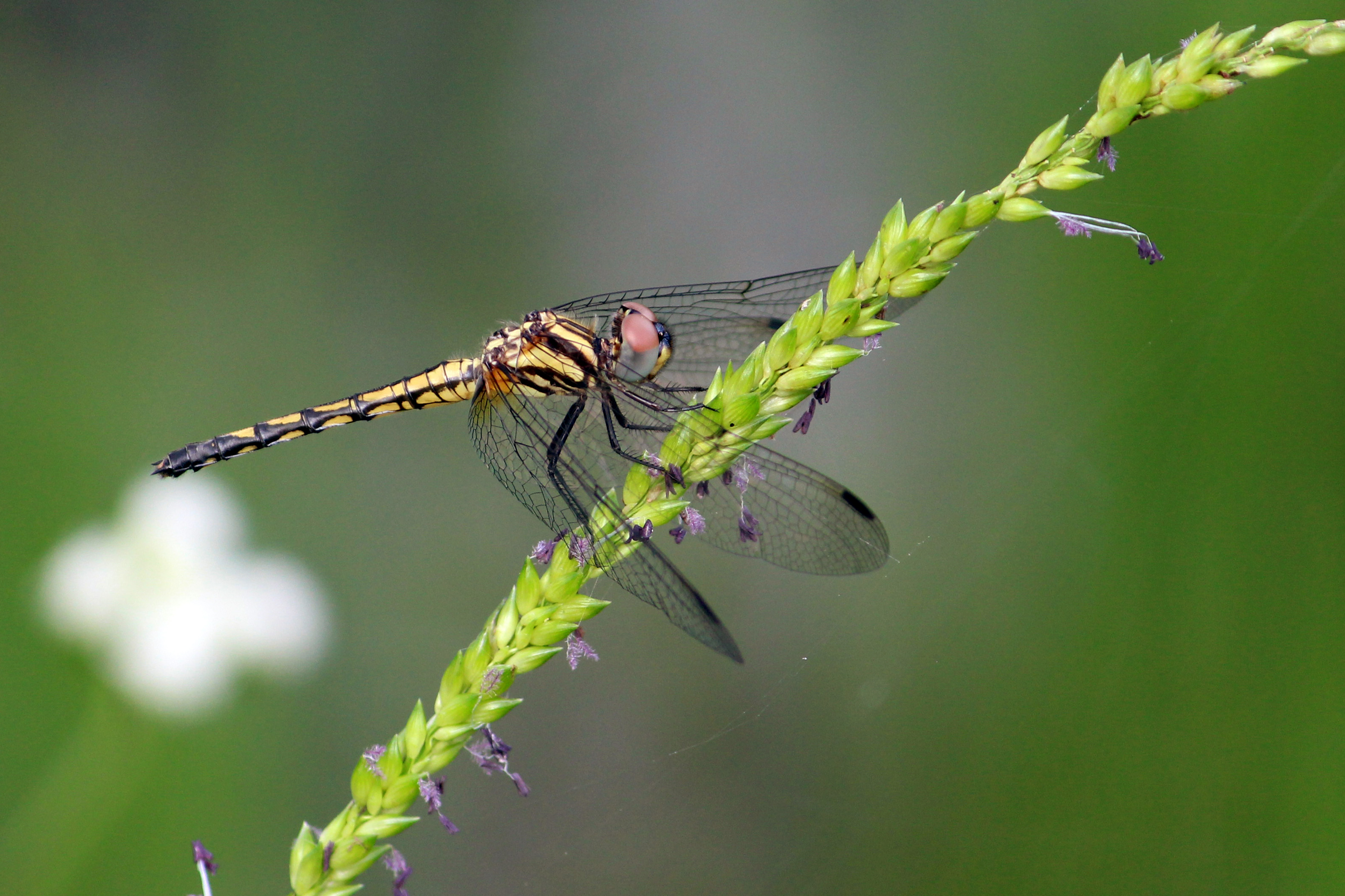
female

== Habitat ==
This dragonfly is commonly seen and has been mostly observed near slow flowing streams and canals, accompanying dense forest ranges. It usually perches on boulders adjacent to streams, rivers and canals. They have also been witnessed perched on tip of aquatic plants, dried plants and similar plants that grow near banks of a sluggish stream or river.
