= Imperial Forestry Institute =

English research institute

The Imperial Forestry Institute (IFI) was a research institute founded at Oxford in 1924. Originally the Institute remained distinct from the School of Forestry, Oxford, however they were both headed by Robert Scott Troup, the Professor of Forestry at Oxford University. However in 1935, as the role of the Institute had grown, the leadership of the two organisations was separated, with a new role, the Director of the Imperial Forestry Institute, with John N. Oliphant, previously Deputy Director of Forestry, Malaya, appointed to that role. Whereas the School of Forestry provided undergraduate instruction which would prepare students for posts in the British Isles or in overseas parts of the British Empire. The Institute provided post graduate study, an opportunity immediately taken up by Forestry officers from the colonies.

== Origins ==
The proposal for the Institute arose at the First British Empire Forestry Conference 1920, with the call for the creation of an impartial Committee, which would consist of representatives of Government the relevant Government departments and other relevant experts. This committee was established and in 1921 submitted a report based on visits the Universities of Oxford, Cambridge, Bangor, and Edinburgh and evidence from other academic bodies involved in forestry. This report advocated the setting up of the IFI at Oxford.
