= Leaf angle distribution =

The leaf angle distribution (or LAD) of a plant canopy refers to the mathematical description of the angular orientation of the leaves in the vegetation. Specifically, if each leaf is conceptually represented by a small flat plate, its orientation can be described with the zenith and the azimuth angles of the surface normal to that plate. If the leaf has a complex structure and is not flat, it may be necessary to approximate the actual leaf by a set of small plates, in which case there may be a number of leaf normals and associated angles. The LAD describes the statistical distribution of these angles.

== Examples of leaf angle distributions ==
Different plant canopies exhibit different LADs: For instance, grasses and willows have their leaves largely hanging vertically (such plants are said to have an erectophile LAD), while oaks tend to maintain their leaves more or less horizontally (these species are known as having a planophile LAD). In some tree species, leaves near the top of the canopy follow an erectophile LAD while those at the bottom of the canopy are more planophile. This may be interpreted as a strategy by that plant species to maximize exposure to light, an important constraint to growth and development. Yet other species (notably sunflower) are capable of reorienting their leaves throughout the day to optimize exposure to the Sun: this is known as heliotropism.

== Importance of LAD ==
The LAD of a plant canopy has a significant impact on the reflectance, transmittance and absorption of solar light in the vegetation layer, and thus also on its growth and development. LAD can also serve as a quantitative index to monitor the state of the plants, as wilting usually results in more erectophile LADs. Models of radiation transfer need to take this distribution into account to predict, for instance, the albedo or the productivity of the canopy.

== Measuring LAD ==
Accurately measuring the statistical properties of leaf angle distributions is not a trivial matter, especially for small leaves. Clinometers can be used but may be rather bulky or inconvenient. Most leaves are quite light and tend to move with the slightest breeze or air turbulence. Nevertheless, when these environmental conditions are suitable or can be controlled, it is possible to acquire data on leaf orientation.

This may be done, for instance, with a Spatial Coordinate Apparatus, which is an articulated mechanical device capable or recording the position in three-dimensional space of three separate points forming a small triangle. The orientation of the triangle is computed from these coordinates.

Yet another approach is to use a laser scanner: this instrument can record the angular and distance coordinates of the intersection of a laser beam with objects within its range. The LAD of canopy leaves can be derived from such measurements.

Extensive data sets of LAD have been recorded, especially during intensive field campaigns, such as the First ISLSCP Field Experiment (FIFE) or the SAFARI 2000 field campaign. See the external links below for getting access to these data.

== LAD functions ==
In general, LAD are modelled with one- or two-parameters functions including ellipsoidal, rotated-ellipsoidal and Beta functions. Its forms or parameters can be estimated from in-situ data such as hemispherical photography and lidar ranging data. Comparison between different LAD functions with in-situ measurements show that, two-parameter functions (especially Beta function) may perform better than one-parameter functions.

== See also ==
- Orixa japonica, a plant with an unusual leaf angle distribution
