= Pathophysiology (journal) =

- Discipline: Pathophysiology
- Language: English
- Edited by: J. Steven Alexander

Publication details
- History: 1994-present
- Publisher: MDPI on behalf of the International Society for Pathophysiology
- Frequency: Quarterly

Standard abbreviations
- ISO 4: Pathophysiology

Indexing
- CODEN: PTHOE7
- ISSN: 0928-4680
- OCLC no.: 643069281

Links
- Journal homepage; Online access (MDPI); Online archive (Elsevier); Journal page at Elsevier's website

Pathophysiology is a quarterly peer-reviewed medical journal covering pathology and pathophysiology. It was established in 1994 and was originally published by Elsevier on behalf of the International Society for Pathophysiology. It was established by Toshikazu Yoshikawa, who was also its first editor-in-chief. The current editor-in-chief is J. Steven Alexander (Louisiana State University Health Sciences Center in Shreveport). The journal is abstracted and indexed in Chemical Abstracts, EMBASE, and Scopus. It is now published by MDPI since 2020.
