= Wilting =

Reduced plant functioning caused by dehydration

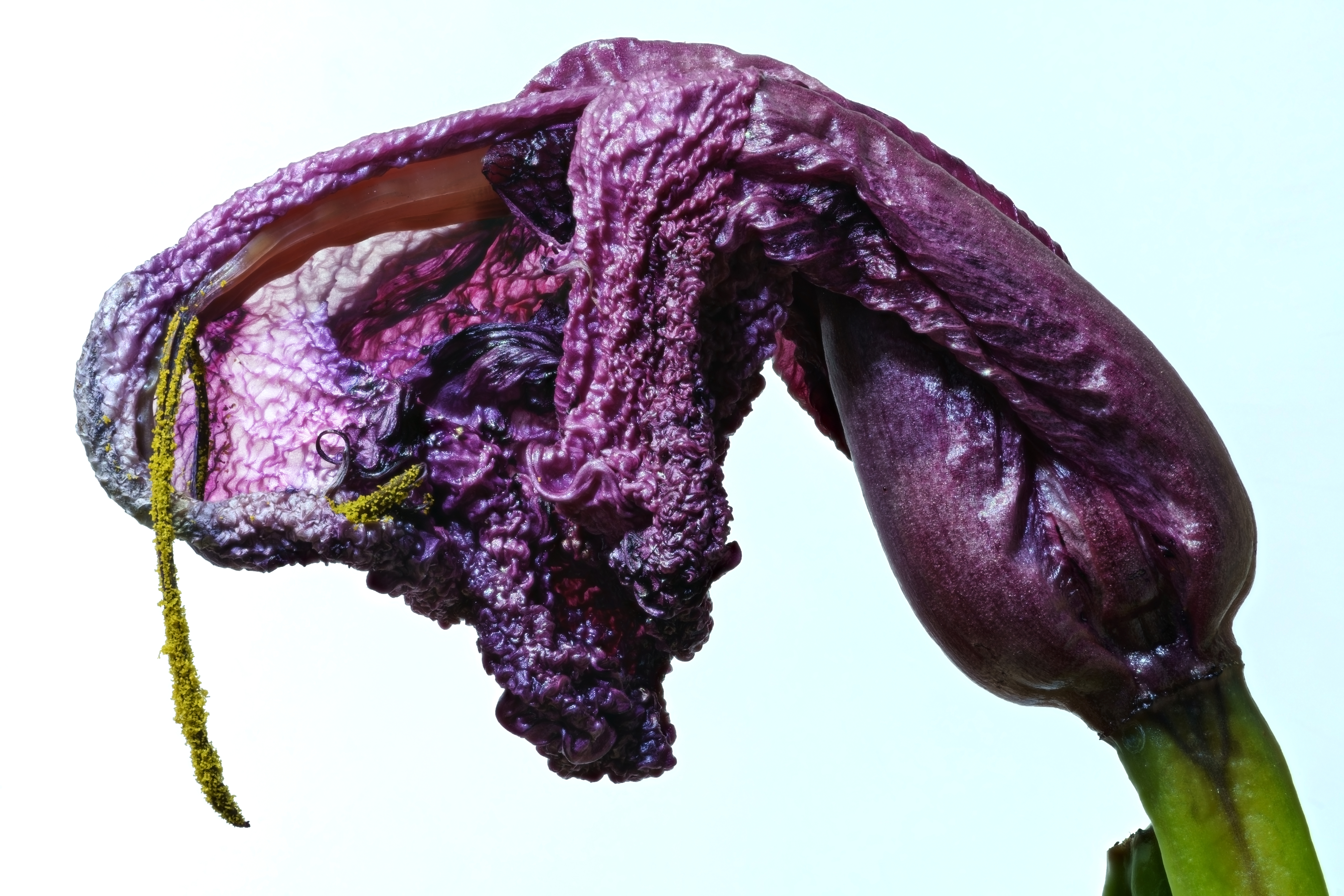
Wilted flower of Tigridia pavonia

Time lapse video of flower wilting

Wilting is the loss of rigidity of non-woody parts of plants. This occurs when the turgor pressure in non-lignified plant cells falls towards zero, as a result of diminished water in the cells. Wilting also serves to reduce water loss, as it makes the leaves expose less surface area. The rate of loss of water from the plant is greater than the absorption of water in the plant. The process of wilting modifies the leaf angle distribution of the plant (or canopy) towards more erectophile conditions.

Lower water availability may result from:

- drought conditions, where the soil moisture drops below conditions most favorable for plant functioning;
- the temperature falls to the point where the plant's vascular system cannot function;
- high salinity, which causes water to diffuse from the plant cells and induce shrinkage;
- saturated soil conditions, where roots are unable to obtain sufficient oxygen for cellular respiration, and so are unable to transport water into the plant; or
- bacteria or fungi that clog the plant's vascular system.

Wilting diminishes the plant's ability to transpire, reproduce and grow. Permanent wilting leads to the plant dying. Symptoms of wilting and blights resemble one another. The plants may recover during the night when evaporation is reduced as the stomata closes.

In woody plants, reduced water availability leads to cavitation of the xylem.

Wilting occurs in plants such as balsam and holy basil. Wilting is an effect of the plant growth-inhibiting hormone, abscisic acid.

With cucurbits, wilting can be caused by the squash vine borer.
