= Geopathology =

Pseudoscientific theory

Geopathology (also Geopathy) is a pseudoscientific theory that links the Earth's inherent radiation with the health of humans, animals and plants.

The term is derived from Greek γεω- (geō-), combining form of γῆ (gê, “earth”) and πάθος (páthos, “suffering”) - ie pathology, widely used to describe infirmities.

The term is more widely used in the adjectival form ie 'geopathic' (sometimes 'geopathological') and often linked to 'stress', creating the terms 'geopathic stress' and 'geostress'.

Gustav Freiherr von Pohl has been described as the modern 'father' of geopathic stress. von Pohl conducted a study in the Bavarian town of Vilsbiburg in 1929 which purported to link focus points of 'earth-radiation' (ger. Erdstrahlen) with incidence of cancer.

Ley lines (a supposition introduced by Alfred Watkins in 1925) have also been suggested to create geopathic stress.

== Geopathic stress (GS) ==
It is suggested that the Earth has a natural vibration, but features like underground watercourses, drainage pipes, underground tunnels and even simple geological faults distort this vibration. Such distorted vibrations are held to rise upwards through the Earth's surface and create a pernicious effect on the health and/or behaviour of all biological life. The distortions are amplified during night hours and consequently the impact is greater if the focal point of the adverse radiation is a bedroom, also noting that the subject, during the time of sleep, will be continually located in the path of such radiation.

== Published academic papers and research ==
- Gerhard W. HACKER; Annabell EDER; Christoph AUGNER; Gernot PAUSER. "Geopathic Stress Zones and Their Influence on the Human Organism" (PDF). www.med-grenzfragen.at.
- Hacker, Gerhard W.; Pawlak, Elisabeth; Pauser, Gernot; Tichy, Gottfried; Jell, Hermann; Posch, Gabriele; Kraibacher, Günther; Aigner, Alfred; Hutter, Jörg (2005). "Biomedical Evidence of Influence of Geopathic Zones on the Human Body: Scientifically Traceable Effects and Ways of Harmonization". Complementary Medicine Research. 12 (6): 315–327. doi:10.1159/000088624. PMID 16391480. S2CID 10301463.
- Augner, Christoph; Hacker, Gerhard W.; Jekel, Ilse (June 2010). "Geopathic Stress Zones: Short-Term Effects on Work Performance and Well-Being?". The Journal of Alternative and Complementary Medicine. 16 (6): 657–661. doi:10.1089/acm.2009.0499. PMID 20569033.
- S. D. AGHAV, P. S. TAMBADE (2015). "Investigating effects of Geopathic Stress on Health Parameters in Young Healthy Volunteers" (PDF). International Journal of Chemical and Physical Sciences (2319–6602).

== See also ==
- Dowsing
- Electromagnetic radiation and health
- Geobiology (pseudoscience)
- Radiesthesia
- List of topics characterised as pseudoscience
