= Geobiology (pseudoscience) =

Pseudoscientific study of the Earth's natural radiation on human, animal and plant biology

Geobiology is a field which studies the effects of the Earth's radiation, such as telluric currents and other electromagnetic fields, on biological life. The term is derived from Ancient Greek gē (ge) meaning 'earth' and βίος; (bios) meaning 'life'. Its findings have not been scientifically proven; thus, it is considered a form of pseudoscience.

== Claims ==
Within geobiology, distinct patterns of Earth radiation, mainly Hartmann lines (named after Ernst Hartmann) and Curry lines (after Manfred Curry; also called Wittmann lines after Siegfried Wittmann) are posited on occasion to have a negative effect on health and even the viability of biological life. Other similar patterns, named after practitioners of geobiology, include Peyré lines (after Francois Peyré), Romani waves (after Lucien Romani), and the Benker cube (after Anton Benker).

It is also claimed that groundwater may create radiation caused by the friction of water against mineral deposits, as well as geological faults, due to a claimed difference in the electric charge of the masses on each side of the fault generating radiation. These are claimed by practitioners to have harmful effects in a phenomenon collectively called geopathic stress. A practitioner of geobiology may also seek out radiation derived from human infrastructure, such as those from overhead and underground power lines and telecommunication infrastructure.

== Techniques ==
Practitioners of geobiology will typically use a dowsing rod, pendulum or their hands to ascertain the location of radiation, and then use this information to make an assessment on its effect on a residential dwelling or workplace and upon localised natural life. Practitioners may also claim be to able to locate and model a building on a basis similar to the theories of Feng shui, Vastu Shastra, or use of Sacred geometry.

== Scientific reception ==
No solid scientific foundation for these phenomena has been made. A task group of the World Health Organization investigating the effects of extremely low frequency (ELF) electric and magnetic fields on the health of the general public found "no substantive health issues related to ELF electric fields at levels generally encountered by members of the public". The results of techniques used by practitioners of geobiology, such as dowsing or other forms of radiesthesia, have been attributed to the ideomotor phenomenon.

== See also ==
- List of topics characterised as pseudoscience
