= British Empire Forestry Conferences =

The British Empire Forestry Conferences were a series of conferences organised to co-ordinate the forestry industry across the British empire.

== Second conference, Canada 25 July – 7 September 1923 ==
The initial session held in Ottawa was addressed by William Lyon Mackenzie King, the Canadian prime minister.

== Third conference, Australia and New Zealand, 1928 ==
The conference brought together delegates from Forest Services across the British Empire alongside trade representatives who gathered in Perth, West Australia, under the chairmanship of Lord Clinton.

== Fourth conference, South Africa, 1935 ==
The conference was held in South Africa in September 1935. The opening session was opened by Deneys Reitz, minister of agriculture and Forestry for the Union of South Africa. During the course of five weeks sessions were held in Durban, Pietermaritzburg, Pretoria and Capetown. The conference ended on 7 October in Capetown.

== Fifth conference, London, 1947 ==
This took place at Church House, Westminster, on 15 June 1947.
