= Jim T. Enright =

James T. Enright (1932-2004) was a professor of behavioral physiology at the Scripps Institution of Oceanography. He has conducted research on circadian rhythms and sensory physiology in both crustaceans and humans, publishing 29 papers between 1980 and 1998. He was named as an AAAS Fellow in 1981 for his work in biological timing mechanisms and marine ecology. He was awarded, also in 1981, the Alexander von Humboldt Foundation's Senior U.S. Scientist Award for his work in visual physiology and optical illusions.
