= Radiesthesia =

Pseudoscientific human ability to detect radiation

Radiesthesia describes a physical ability to detect radiation emitted by a person, animal, object or geographical feature. One of its practitioners, J. Cecil Maby, defined it as "The faculty and study of certain reflexive physical responses of living tissue to various radiations ... resulting in displacement currents and other inductive effects in living tissues." He distinguished it critically from the psychic facility of divination. Despite this distinction, there is no scientific evidence for the existence of the phenomenon and it is classed by the mainstream as pseudoscience.

== Definitions ==
One definition is "sensitivity to radiations of all kinds emanating from living beings, inanimate objects, mineral ores, water and even photographs".

The word derives from Latin root radi- referring to beams of light, radiation and aesthesia, referring to sensory perception.

The term is a neologism created by a French Catholic priest Alexis Timothée Bouly who was a celebrated dowsing practitioner in the early part of the 20th century. Bouly claimed to be able to detect unexploded ordnance from WW1 and also to detect molecular changes in laboratory experiments. He was the founder at Lille in 1929 of the Association of the Friends of Radiesthesia (Association des Amis de la Radiesthésie).

== Claims ==
Practitioners may claim to be able to detect the emitted radiation through use of their hands or more typically with dowsing rods or a pendulum.

Teleradiesthesia or tele-radiesthesia describes this sensitivity to radiation but without the need to be in physical proximity to the subject. Typically a practitioner will use an instrument such as a pendulum to perform analysis based on a map or photograph.

The practical application of radiesthesia, i.e. dowsing, is directed toward providing individual and environmental benefits, such as:

- diagnosis of infirmities
- detection of underground water
- detection of underground mineral sources
- detection of the Earth's telluric currents and magnetic fields
- location of lost objects
- location of missing persons or livestock

A distinction may be made in the application of radiesthesic techniques in the detection of physical phenomena e.g. water, minerals, objects, changed cell condition and using these techniques for analysis of supposed subtle energy fields or the 'aura' of an individual.

Researchers have cited an involuntary bodily reaction, that is, ideomotor phenomenon, as the initiator of the movement seen occurring in instruments such as dowsing rods or a pendulum. It is this reactive movement which typically acts as the indicator of the location or the state change of the subject or object under investigation.

== See also ==
- Dowsing – Pseudoscientific attempts to locate underground objects
- Geobiology (pseudoscience) – Pseudoscientific study of the Earth's natural radiation on human, animal and plant biology
- Radionics – Form of alternative medicine
- Rhabdomancy – Divination technique
