= Lorne Elias =

Canadian chemist, inventor

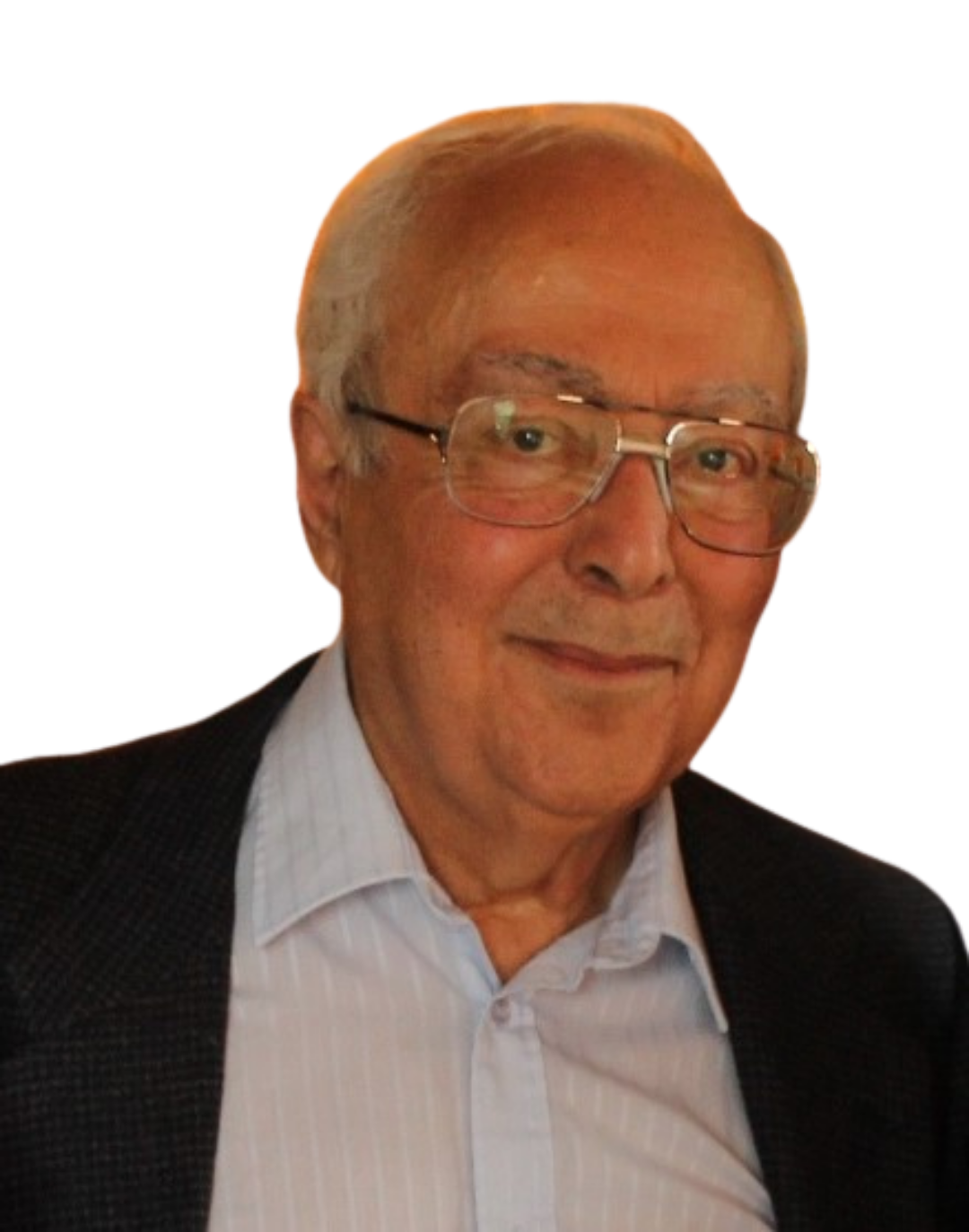
- Portrait of Lorne Elias, inventor of explosives vapour detector EVD-1
- Education: McGill University (PhD); Carleton University (BSc Hons)
- Known for: Explosives detection
- Scientific career
- Fields: Chemistry
- Workplaces: National Research Council Canada
- Thesis: A general direct-current method for the measurement of electrolytic conductance, and its application to nitromethane solutions of quaternary ammonium halides (1956)
- Doctoral advisor: H. Schiff

Lorne Elias is a Canadian chemist, inventor, and a pioneer in explosives detection technology. He invented the explosives vapour detector, EVD-1, a portable bomb detection instrument deployed at international airports in Canada in the 1980s. He contributed to the field of explosives detection for over three decades, and is called the father of vapour and trace explosives detection technology.

== Education ==
Lorne Elias obtained a Bachelor of Science in chemistry from Carleton University in 1952. He received a PhD in physical chemistry under the direction of H. Schiff from McGill University in 1956.

== Career and research ==
Elias conducted research on trace organic analyses at National Research Council Canada, from pesticides to narcotics and explosives. He invented the portable suitcase-sized explosives vapour detector, EVD-1, and the Trace Narcotics Detector. EVD-1 was based on gas chromatography with electron capture detector, and the Trace Narcotics Detector was based on gas chromatography with nitrogen-phosphorus detector. EVD-1 was the first portable bomb detection instrument in Canada, one of the 100 notable innovations from National Research Council Canada, and one of 50 Greatest Canadian Inventions. EVD-1 was capable of detecting minute amounts of dynamite, other explosives, and 2,3-Dimethyl-2,3-dinitrobutane (DMNB, a taggant or marker in plastic explosives). EVD-1 was deployed during the papal visit in 1984 and alarmed on a luggage of Pope John Paul II, due to a revolver in the luggage packed by bodyguards. Similarly, the EVD-1 detected signatures of black powder from the revolver of a security guard during President Reagan's visit to Canada. The EVD-1 technology was transferred from National Research Council Canada to industry, and units of EVD-1 were deployed at international airports in Canada after the 1985 Air India bombing. Elias, a pioneer who shaped the development of explosives detection technology deployed today, is called the father of vapour and trace explosives detection technology.

Elias was part of the International Civil Aviation Organization Ad Hoc Group of Specialists on the Detection of Explosives. He contributed in the development and evaluation of the ICAO detection markers for plastic explosives, which led to the Convention on the Marking of Plastic Explosives for the Purpose of Detection. He studied the permeability of detection markers (DMNB, ethylene glycol dinitrate EGDN, ortho-mononitrotoluene o-MNT and para-mononitrotoluene p-MNT) through various materials and their vapour pressures, and conducted research in encapsulating DMNB in order to extend the shelf life.

He retired from National Research Council Canada after 35 years, and continued with explosives detection research as a private consultant (JenEl TVD Research and Consulting Inc) for a number of government departments, including the U.S. Federal Aviation Administration, Transport Canada, and the Canadian Explosives Research Laboratory of Natural Resources Canada.

== Selected publications ==
Journal Articles

- Elias, L. (1975). "Airborne GC Analyzer for Study of Pesticide Vapor Drift". Journal of Chromatographic Science. 13 (4): 178–181. doi:10.1093/chromsci/13.4.178.
- Krzymien, M.; Elias, L. (1976). "A Continuous-Flow Trace Vapour Source". Journal of Physics E: Scientific Instruments. 9 (7): 584–586. Bibcode:1976JPhE....9..584K. doi:10.1088/0022-3735/9/7/021.
- Lawrence, A. H.; Elias, L.; Authier-Martin, M. (1984). "Determination of Amphetamine, Cocaine, and Heroin Vapour Pressures Using a Dynamic Gas Blending System and Gas Chromatographic Analysis". Canadian Journal of Chemistry. 62 (10): 1886–1888. doi:10.1139/v84-323.
- Lawrence, A. H.; Elias, L. (1985). "Detection of Amphetamine in Air by Solid Adsorbent Preconcentration and Gas Chromatographic Analysis". Analytical Chemistry. 57 (7): 1485–1488. doi:10.1021/ac00284a073.
- Lawrence, A. H.; Elias, L. (1985). "Application of Air Sampling and Ion-Mobility Spectrometry to Narcotics Detection: a Feasibility Study". Bulletin on Narcotics. 37 (1): 3–16. PMID 4063571.
- Neudorfl, P.; Elias, L. (1986). "Research Programme on Explosives Vapour Detection at NRC". Journal of Energetic Materials. 4 (1–4): 415–446. Bibcode:1986JEnM....4..415N. doi:10.1080/07370658608011352.
- Elias, L.; Lawrence, A. H. (1987). "Portable Trace Narcotics Detector for Field Use". Canadian Journal of Spectroscopy. 32: 14A–15A.
- Lawrence, A. H.; Elias, L. (1989). "A Single-stage Gas Chromatographic Injector Apparatus for Thermal Desorption of Sorbent Tubes". American Laboratory. 21: 88–93.

Book Chapters

- Elias, L.; Lawrence, A. (1992). "Chapter 10: On-site Sampling and Detection of Drug Particulates". In Gough, Terry A. (ed.). The Analysis of Drugs of Abuse. Wiley. pp. 373–400. ISBN 978-0-471-92267-4.
- Lawrence, A. H.; Elias, L. (1992). "Chapter 1: New Applications for Ion Mobility Spectrometry Detection Techniques". In Clement, R. E.; Siu, K. W.; Hill, H. H. Jr. (eds.). Instrumentation for Trace Organic Monitoring. Wiley. pp. 1–11. ISBN 9781315894621.
- Neudorfl, P.; McCooeye, M. A.; Elias, L. (1993). "Testing Protocol for Surface-Sampling Detectors". In Yinon, J. (ed.). Advances in Analysis and Detection of Explosives. Springer. pp. 373–401. ISBN 978-90-481-4241-5.

Conference Proceedings

- Seman, G.; Elias, L. (1978). Detection of Hidden Explosives on Passenger Aircraft Using Hand Searchers, Bio-Sensors and Vapour Detectors. New Concepts Symposium and Workshop on Detection and Identification of Explosives. pp. 119–138.
- Elias, L. (1978). Recent Projects at NRC Related to Explosives Detection. New Concepts Symposium and Workshop on Detection and Identification of Explosives. p. 265.
- Elias, L.; Neudorfl, P. (1990). Laboratory Evaluation of Portable and Walk-Through Explosives Vapour Detectors. 3rd Symposium on Analysis and Detection of Explosives. pp. 43-1 – 43-19.
- Elias, L. (1993). Workshop on Test Protocols and Procedures for the Evaluation of Trace Explosives Detecting Equipment. Final Report. Workshop on Test Protocols and Procedures for the Evaluation of Trace Explosives Detecting Equipment. Ottawa, Canada: National Research Council Canada.

== Patents ==
- Concentrator for Detection of Amine Vapors (1987) US 4,701,306A
- Trace vapor concentrator (1987) US 4,698,071A
- Method and Apparatus for the Introduction of a Vaporizable Sample into an Analytical Test Apparatus (1988) US 4,732,046A
- Sorbent Tube Trace Sample Releasing Apparatus (1990) US 4,890,502A
- Trace vapour concentrator (1990) CA 1,266,621A
- Method for Testing the Freshness of Fish (1990) US 4,980,294A
- Method of determining wood species (1991) CA 2,009,062A1
- Thermally-Releasable-Sample Collecting Device (1993) US 5,181,427A
- Method and apparatus for the detection of a hidden element exuding vapor (2001) WO2001092850A1
