= List of high commissioners of Bangladesh to Canada =

High Commissioner of Bangladesh to the Canada
- কানাডায় নিযুক্ত বাংলাদেশের হাইকমিশনার
- Incumbent; Nahida Sobhan since May 30, 2024
- Ministry of Foreign Affairs
- Style: The Honourable (formal); Mr. or Madam High Commissioner (informal); His Excellency (diplomatic)
- Reports to: Chief Adviser; Minister of Foreign Affairs
- Seat: 350 Sparks, Ottawa, Canada
- Nominator: The government of Bangladesh
- Appointer: The president of Bangladesh; on the advice of the; chief adviser
- Term length: Chief adviser’s pleasure
- Inaugural holder: Abdul Momin
- Formation: May 1972; 54 years ago
- Website: Official website

The Bangladeshi high commissioner to Canada is the official representative of the government of Bangladesh to the government of Canada.

== List of representatives ==
Commissioned	High Commissioner (Commonwealth)	Observations	Prime Minister of Bangladesh	Prime Minister of Canada	Term end
May 1972	Abdul Momin		Sheikh Mujibur Rahman	Pierre Trudeau	
February 1976	M. Ataur Rahman	1972: Republic of Bangladesh have decided to appoint Mr M. Ataur Rahman as Chief of Bangladesh Mission in Cairo. 2016: Honorary Consul Auckland New Zealand	Abu Sadat Mohammad Sayem	Pierre Trudeau	
March 1979	Hosen Ali		Ziaur Rahman	Joe Clark	
August 1981	K M Shafiullah		Azizur Rahman	Pierre Trudeau	
September 1986	A. N. M. Nuruzzaman		Mizanur Rahman Chowdhury	Brian Mulroney	
August 1990	Mohammad Mohsin	From 19 July 1988 to 25 June 1989: Foreign Secretary. From 1991 to 1996 he was the chief OIC representative in successfully brokering a historic final peace agreement between the Manila government and the Moro National Liberation Front (MNLF) affirming the peace and development process in Southern Philippines. The agreement was signed in Jakarta on 30 August 1996.	Shahabuddin Ahmed	Brian Mulroney	
February 1995	Mufleh R. Osmany	1993 -1995 he was Foreign Secretary.	Khaleda Zia	Jean Chrétien	
May 1998	M. Aminul Islam		Hasina Wazed	Jean Chrétien	
April 2001	Suhrab Hossain	Until 31 December 2015 he was Bangladeshi High Commissioner to Islamabad.	Latifur Rahman	Jean Chrétien	
February 2002	Mohsin Ali Khan		Khaleda Zia	Jean Chrétien	
April 2004	Rafiq Ahmed Khan	He was the Bangladesh Consul General in New York in two terms, first in 1996 and then in 2001–2004.	Khaleda Zia	Paul Martin	
March 2008	A. M. Yakub Ali		Fakhruddin Ahmed	Stephen Harper	
September 2012	Kamrul Ahsan		Sheikh Hasina	Stephen Harper	May 2016
8 August 2016	Mizanur Rahman	In 2008 he was appointed ambassador to the Netherlands.; In June 2008 he was appointed ambassador to Cairo.	Sheikh Hasina	Justin Trudeau	August 2020
16 August 2020	Khalilur Rahman	He was previously the Chief Coordinator for Corona Cell in the Ministry of Foreign Affairs.	Sheikh Hasina	Justin Trudeau	
