= Mine A.P. Improvised Type II =

- Type: Anti-personnel mine
- Place of origin: United Kingdom

Service history
- Used by: United Kingdom
- Wars: World War II

Specifications
- Length: 5 inches
- Width: 3 inches
- Height: 2.5 inches
- Filling: Nobel 808

The Mine A.P. Improvised Type II is a British Anti-personnel mine of World War II

== Design ==
=== Parts ===
The mine is a wooden box with a lid. The box can be divided into two half with one half contain the pressure switch with its pressure head that triggers the mine put between two wooden block the one on top smaller than the one below. The other half contains the detonator and gunpowder primer and Nobel 808 explosive charge surrounding the primer.

=== Detonation process ===
Pressure on the mine forces down the pressure head which then frees the striker which impacts the detonator which detonates the primer exploding the main Nobel 808 explosive charge.

=== Arming and disarming ===
To arm the mine just put in place the pressure switch head and put a wooden block on top of it then put the lid back on the mine. To disarm just remove the pressure switch head.

== History ==
This mine just like the Mine A.P. Improvised Type I was designed and highly manufactured by the 38th field park company Royal engineers. The high quantity likely means again they must have seen significant use.

== See also ==
- Mine diagram
