= C-4 (explosive) =

Variety of plastic explosive

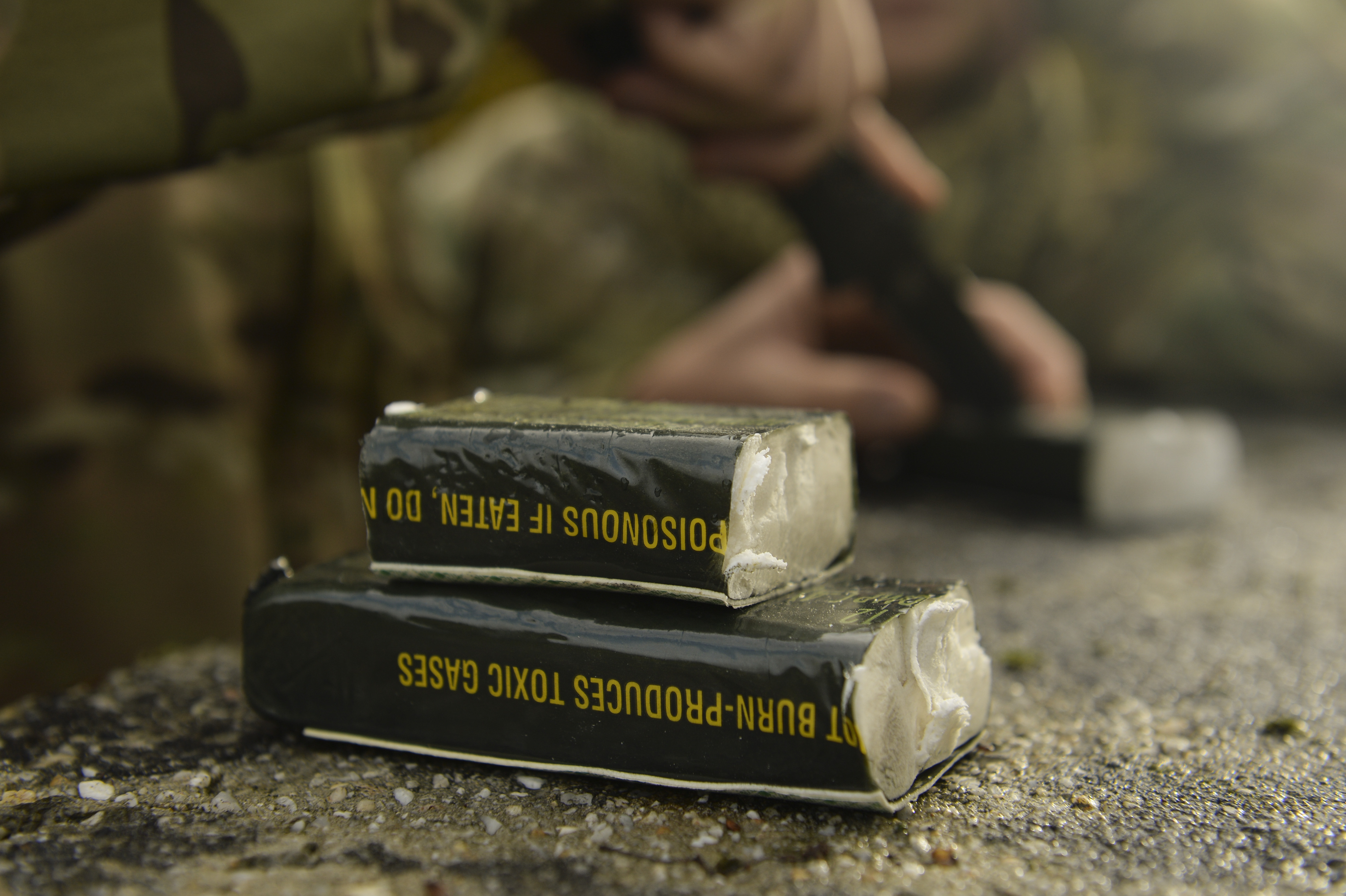
- Blocks of C-4 cut to size during a demo training session, showing the white plastic explosive material
- Type: High-yield chemical explosive
- Place of origin: United States

Service history
- Used by: United States
- Wars: Vietnam War; War on terror 2022 Russian invasion of Ukraine

Production history
- Designed: 1956
- Produced: 1956–current
- Variants: PE-4, M112

Specifications (M112)
- Mass: 1.25 lb (0.57 kg)
- Length: 11 in (28 cm)
- Width: 2 in (5.1 cm)
- Height: 1.5 in (3.8 cm)
- Filling: RDX
- Filling weight: 91%
- Detonation mechanism: PETN-based detonating cord
- Blast yield: High

C-4 or Composition C-4 is a common variety of the plastic explosive family known as Composition C, which uses RDX as its explosive agent. C-4 is composed of explosives, plastic binder, plasticizer to make it malleable, and usually a marker or odorizing taggant chemical. C-4 has a texture similar to modelling clay and can be molded into any desired shape. C-4 is relatively insensitive and can be detonated only by the shock wave from a detonator or blasting cap.

A similar British plastic explosive, also based on RDX but with a plasticizer different from that used in Composition C-4, is known as PE-4 (Plastic Explosive No. 4).

== Development ==
C-4 is a member of the Composition C family of chemical explosives. Variants have different proportions and plasticisers and include compositions C-2, C-3, and C-4. The original RDX-based material was developed by the British during World War II and redeveloped as Composition C when introduced to the U.S. military. It was replaced by Composition C-2 around 1943 and later redeveloped around 1944 as Composition C-3. The toxicity of C-3 was reduced, the concentration of RDX was increased, giving it improved safety during usage and storage. Research on a replacement for C-3 was begun prior to 1950, but the new material, C-4, did not begin pilot production until 1956. C-4 was submitted for patent as "Solid Propellant and a Process for its Preparation" March 31, 1958, by the Phillips Petroleum Company.

== Characteristics and uses ==
=== Composition ===
The Composition C-4 used by the United States Armed Forces contains 91% RDX ("Research Department Explosive", an explosive nitroamine), bound by a mixture of 5.3% dioctyl sebacate (DOS) or dioctyl adipate (DOA) as the plasticizer (to increase the plasticity of the explosive), thickened with 2.1% polyisobutylene (PIB, a synthetic rubber) as the binder, and 1.6% of a mineral oil often called "process oil". Instead of "process oil", low-viscosity motor oil is used in the manufacture of C-4 for civilian use.

The British PE4 consists of 88.0% RDX, 1.0% pentaerythrite dioleate and 11.0% DG-29 lithium grease (corresp. to 2.2% lithium stearate and 8.8% mineral oil BP) as the binder; a taggant (2,3-dimethyl-2,3-dinitrobutane, DMDNB) is added at a minimum of 0.10% weight of the plastic explosive, typically at 1.0% mass. The newer PE7 consists of 88.0% RDX, 1.0% DMDNB taggant and 11.0% of a binder composed of low molecular mass hydroxyl-terminated polybutadiene, along with an antioxidant and an agent preventing hardening of the binder upon prolonged storage. The PE8 consists of 86.5% RDX, 1.0% DMDNB taggant and 12.5% of a binder composed of di(2-ethylhexyl) sebacate thickened with high molecular mass polyisobutylene.

Technical data according to the Department of the Army for the Composition C-4 follows.

Theoretical maximum density of the mixture, grams per cubic centimeter	1.75
Nominal density, grams per cubic centimeter	1.72658
Heat of formation, calories per gram	−32.9 to −33.33
Max heat of detonation with liquid water, kilocalories per gram	1.59 (6.7 MJ/kg)
Max heat of detonation with gaseous water, kilocalories per gram	1.40 (5.9 MJ/kg)
Remains plastic with no exudation, Celsius	−57 to +77
Detonation pressure with density of 1.58 grams per cubic centimeter, kilobars	257

==== Manufacture ====
C-4 is manufactured by combining the above ingredients with binders dissolved in a solvent. Once the ingredients have been mixed, the solvent is extracted through drying and filtering. The final material is a solid with a dirty white to light brown color, a putty-like texture similar to modeling clay, and a distinct smell of motor oil. Depending on its intended usage and on the manufacturer, there are differences in the composition of C-4. For example, a 1990 U.S. Army technical manual stipulated that Class IV composition C-4 consists of 89.9±1% RDX, 10±1% polyisobutylene, and 0.2±0.02% dye that is itself made up of 90% lead chromate and 10% lamp black. RDX classes A, B, E, and H are all suitable for use in C-4. Classes are measured by granulation.

The manufacturing process for Composition C-4 specifies that wet RDX and plastic binder are added in a stainless steel mixing kettle. This is called the aqueous slurry-coating process. The kettle is tumbled to obtain a homogeneous mixture. This mixture is wet and must be dried after transfer to drying trays. Drying with forced air for 16 hours at 50 °C to 60 °C is recommended to eliminate excess moisture.

C-4 produced for use by the U.S. military, commercial C-4 (also produced in the United States), and PE-4 from the United Kingdom each have their own unique properties and are not identical. The analytical techniques of time-of-flight secondary ion mass spectrometry and X-ray photoelectron spectroscopy have been demonstrated to discriminate finite differences in different C-4 sources. Chemical, morphological structural differences, and variation in atomic concentrations are detectable and definable.

=== Detonation ===
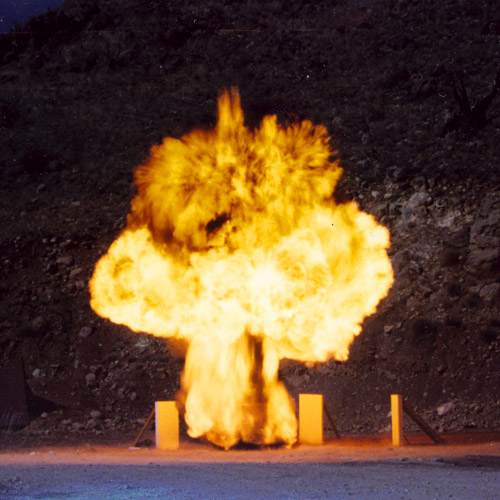
A detonation within a blast-resistant trash receptacle using a large C-4 explosive charge

C-4 is very stable and insensitive to most physical shocks. C-4 cannot be detonated by a gunshot or by dropping it onto a hard surface. It does not explode when set on fire or exposed to microwaves. Detonation can be initiated only by a shockwave, such as when a detonator inserted into it is fired. When detonated, C-4 rapidly decomposes to release nitrogen, water and carbon oxides as well as other gases. The detonation proceeds at an explosive velocity of 8,092 m/s (26,550 ft/s).

A major advantage of C-4 is that it can easily be molded into any desired shape to change the direction of the resulting explosion. C-4 has high cutting ability. For example, the complete severing of a 36-centimetre (14 in) deep I-beam takes between 680 and 910 g (1.50 and 2.01 lb) of C-4 when properly applied in thin sheets.

=== Form ===
Military grade C-4 is commonly packaged as the M112 demolition block. The demolition charge M112 is a rectangular block of Composition C-4 about 2 by 1.5 inches (51 mm × 38 mm) and 11 inches (280 mm) long, weighing 1.25 lb (570 g). The M112 is wrapped in a sometimes olive color Mylar-film container with a pressure-sensitive adhesive tape on one surface.

The M112 demolition blocks of C-4 are commonly manufactured into the M183 "demolition charge assembly", which consists of 16 M112 block demolition charges and four priming assemblies packaged inside military Carrying Case M85. The M183 is used to breach obstacles or demolish large structures where larger satchel charges are required. Each priming assembly includes a five-or-twenty-foot (1.5 or 6.1 m) length of detonating cord assembled with detonating cord clips and capped at each end with a booster. When the charge is detonated, the explosive is converted into compressed gas. The gas exerts pressure in the form of a shock wave, which demolishes the target by cutting, breaching, or cratering.

Other forms include the mine-clearing line charge and M18A1 Claymore mine.

=== Safety ===
Composition C-4 exists in the U.S. Army Hazardous Components Safety Data Sheet on sheet number 00077. Impact tests done by the U.S. military indicate composition C-4 is less sensitive than composition C-3 and is fairly insensitive. The insensitivity is attributed to using a large amount of binder in its composition. A series of shots were fired at vials containing C-4 in a test referred to as "the rifle bullet test". Only 20% of the vials burned, and none exploded. While C-4 passed the Army's bullet impact and fragment impact tests at ambient temperature, it failed the shock stimulus, sympathetic detonation and shaped charge jet tests. Additional tests were done including the "pendulum friction test", which measured a five-second explosion temperature of 263 °C to 290 °C. The minimum initiating charge required is 0.2 grams of lead azide or 0.1 grams of tetryl. The results of 100 °C heat test are: 0.13% loss in the first 48 hours, no loss in the second 48 hours, and no explosions in 100 hours. The vacuum stability test at 100 °C yields 0.2 cubic centimeters of gas in 40 hours. Composition C-4 is essentially nonhygroscopic.

The shock sensitivity of C-4 is related to the size of the nitramine particles. The finer they are the better they help to absorb and suppress shock. Using 3-nitrotriazol-5-one (NTO), or 1,3,5-triamino-2,4,6-trinitrobenzene (TATB) (available in two particle sizes (5 μm, 40 μm)), as a substitute for RDX, is also able to improve stability to thermal, shock, and impact/friction stimulus; however, TATB is not cost-effective, and NTO is more difficult to use in the manufacturing process.

Sensitivity test values reported by the U.S. Army.
Impact test with 2 kilogram weight / PA APP (% TNT)	>100
Impact test with 2 kilogram weight / BM APP (% TNT)	—N/a
Pendulum friction test, percent explosions	0
Rifle bullet test, percent explosions	20
Explosion temperature test, Celsius	263 to 290
Minimum detonating charge, gram of lead azide	0.2
Brisance measured by Sand test (% TNT)	116
Brisance measured by plate dent test	115 to 130
Rate of detonation at density	1.59
Rate of detonation meters per second	8000
Ballistic pendulum test percent	130

== Analysis ==
=== Toxicity ===
C-4 has toxic effects on humans when ingested. Within a few hours multiple generalized seizures, vomiting, and changes in mental activity occur. A strong link to central nervous dysfunction is observed. If ingested, patients may be administered a dose of active charcoal to adsorb some of the toxins, and haloperidol intramuscularly and diazepam intravenously to help the patient control seizures until it has passed. However, ingesting small amounts of C-4 is not known to cause any long-term impairment.

=== Investigation ===
If C-4 is marked with a taggant, such as DMNB, it can be detected with an explosive vapor detector before it has been detonated. A variety of methods for explosive residue analysis may be used to identify C-4. These include optical microscope examination and scanning electron microscopy for unreacted explosive, chemical spot tests, thin-layer chromatography, X-ray crystallography, and infrared spectroscopy for products of the explosive chemical reaction. Small particles of C-4 may be easily identified by mixing with thymol crystals and a few drops of sulfuric acid. The mixture will become rose colored upon addition of a small quantity of ethyl alcohol.

RDX has a high birefringence, and the other components commonly found in C-4 are generally isotropic; this makes it possible for forensic science teams to detect trace residue on fingertips of individuals who may have recently been in contact with the compound. However, positive results are highly variable and the mass of RDX can range between 1.7 and 130 ng, each analysis must be individually handled using magnifying equipment. The cross polarized light images obtained from microscopic analysis of the fingerprint are analyzed with gray-scale thresholding to improve contrast for the particles. The contrast is then inverted in order to show dark RDX particles against a light background. Relative numbers and positions of RDX particles have been measured from a series of 50 fingerprints left after a single contact impression.

Military and commercial C-4 are blended with different oils. It is possible to distinguish these sources by analyzing this oil by high-temperature gas chromatography–mass spectrometry. The oil and plasticizer must be separated from the C-4 sample, typically by using a non-polar organic solvent such as pentane followed by solid phase extraction of the plasticizer on silica. This method of analysis is limited by manufacturing variation and methods of distribution.

== Use ==
=== Vietnam War ===
U.S. soldiers during the Vietnam War era would sometimes use small amounts of C-4 as a fuel for heating rations, as it will burn unless detonated with a primary explosive. However, burning C-4 produces poisonous fumes, and soldiers are warned of the dangers of personal injury when using the plastic explosive.

Among field troops in Vietnam a rumor circulated that ingestion of a small amount of C-4 would produce a "high" similar to alcohol. In fact, the RDX in C-4 is a strong vasodilator (cf. nitroglycerin), and its ingestion produces only unpleasant (e.g., migraine, fatigue, fever) or dangerous effects (e.g., severe kidney damage, seizures, coma). Due to this toxicity, some troops made use of the explosive to induce temporary illness in the hope of being sent on sick leave.

=== Use by non-military groups ===
Terrorist groups have used C-4 worldwide in acts of terrorism and insurgency, as well as domestic terrorism and state terrorism.

On May 13, 1985, the Philadelphia Police Department dropped a C-4 bomb on the home of the MOVE organization, killing eleven people — including five children — and wiping out 61 homes in two city blocks in a subsequent fire.

Composition C-4 is recommended in al-Qaeda's traditional curriculum of explosives training. In October 2000, the group used C-4 to attack the USS Cole, killing 17 sailors. In 1996, Saudi Hezbollah terrorists used C-4 to blow up the Khobar Towers, a U.S. military housing complex in Saudi Arabia. Composition C-4 has also been used in improvised explosive devices by Iraqi insurgents.

=== Gallery ===
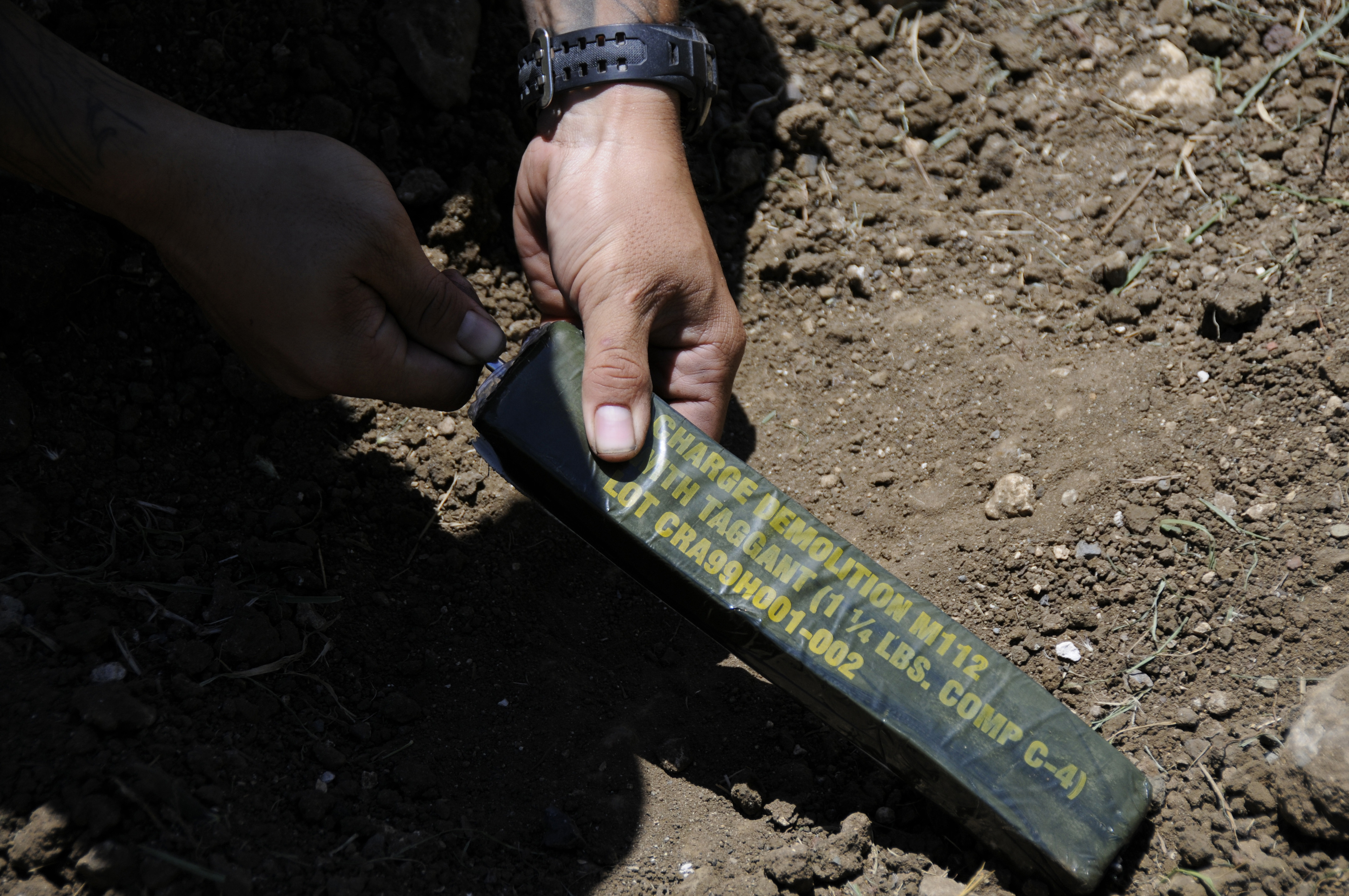
Inserting a blasting cap into a block of C-4 to ready it for detonation

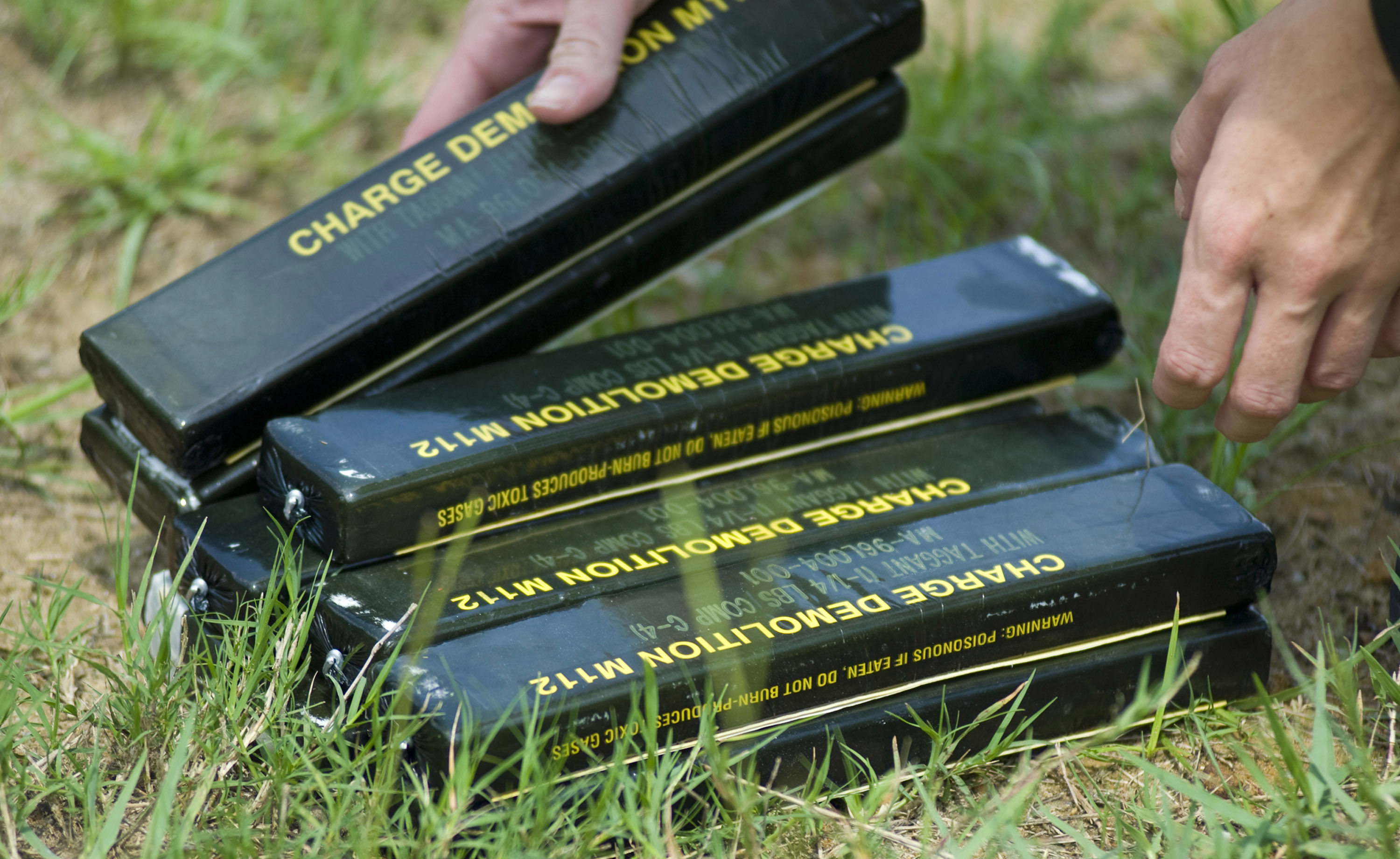
Wrapping on packaged C-4 indicate that it has been tagged for easier detection. Even if no taggant is used, sophisticated forensic means can still be employed to identify the presence of C-4.

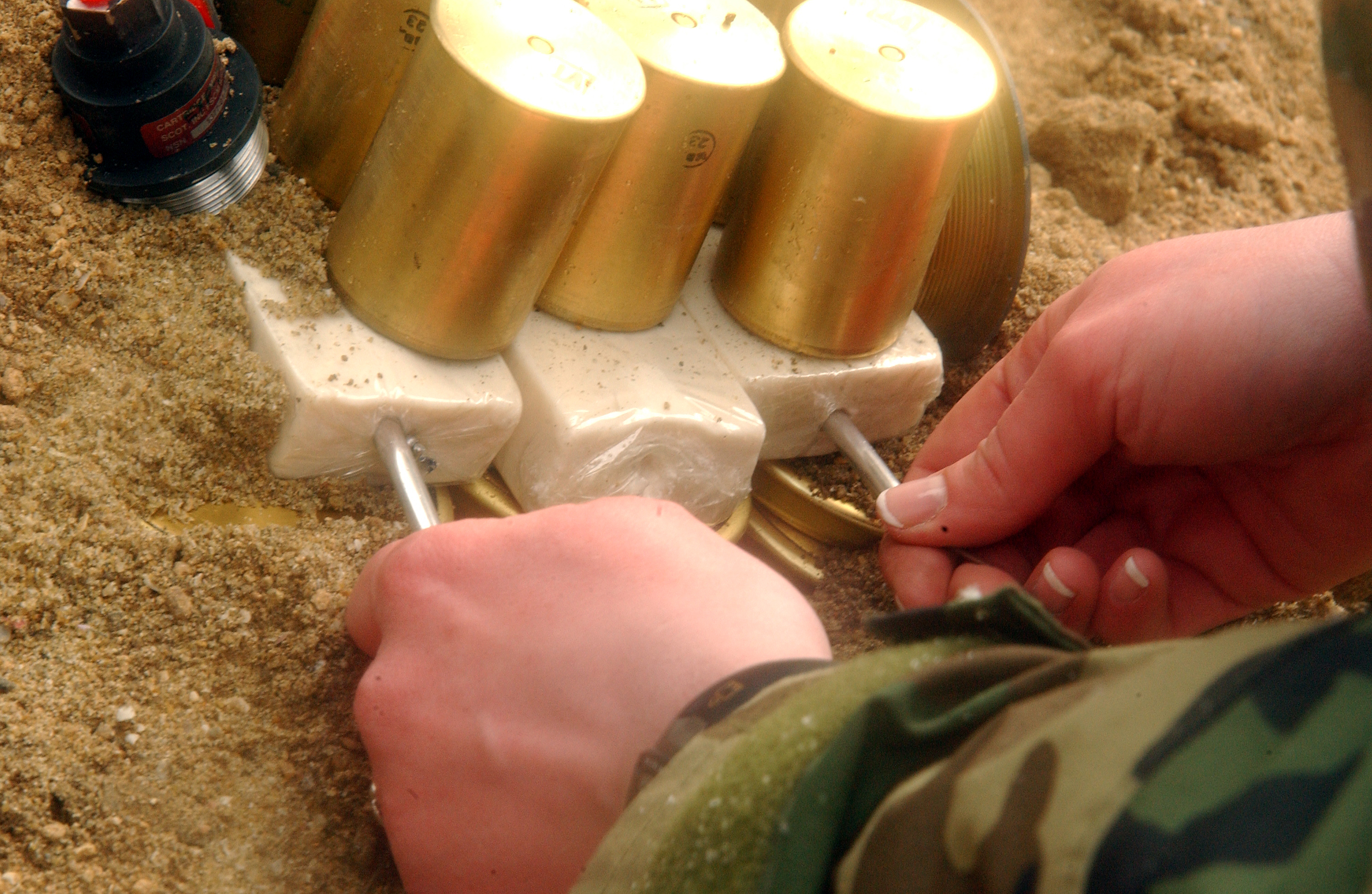
Inserting blasting caps into blocks of C-4 explosive (bottom) being used to destroy unexploded artillery components (cylinders)

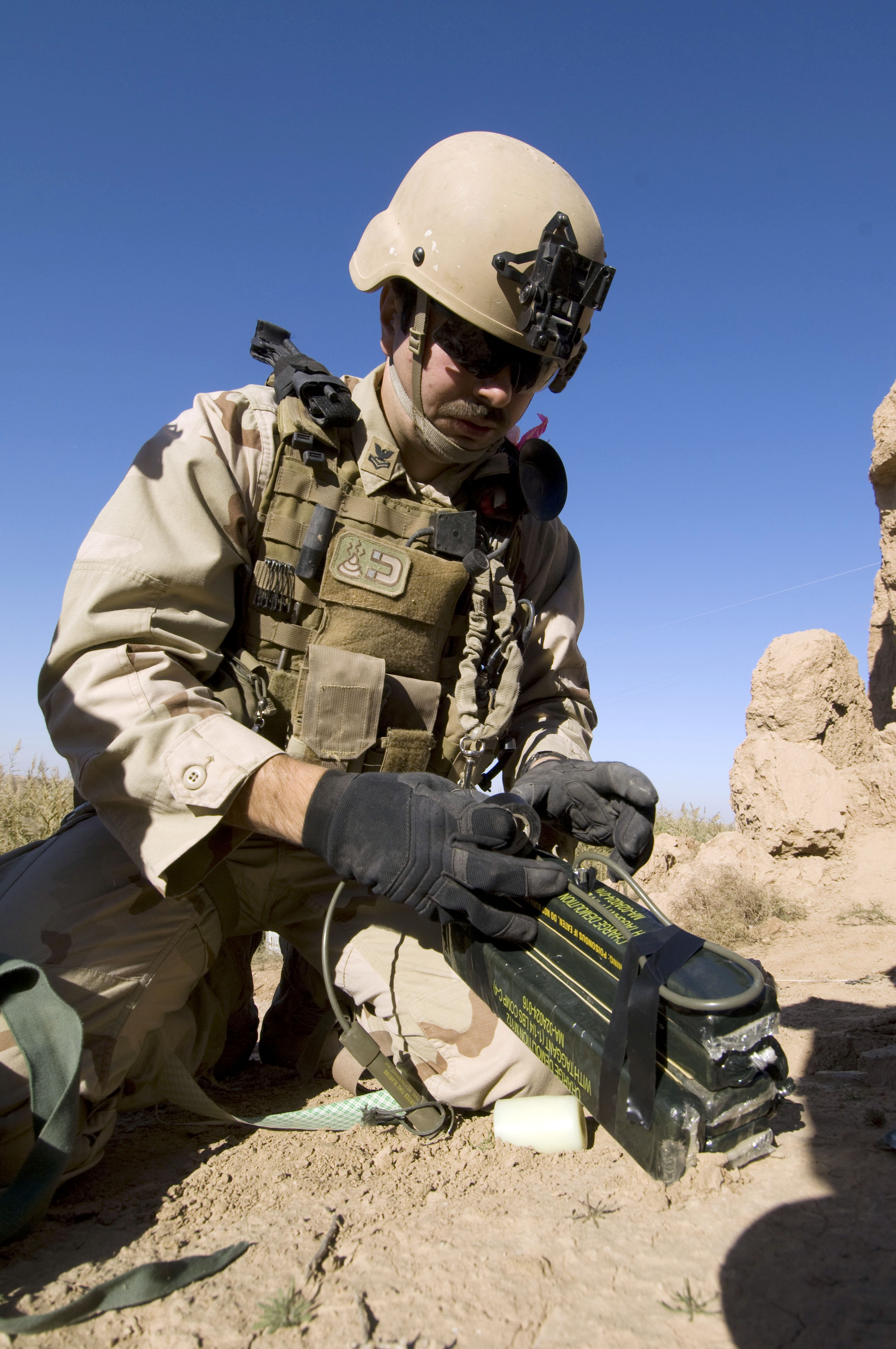
A demolition charge being assembled from multiple sticks of C-4

== See also ==
- Bomb
- Composition B
- Fuse
- Polymer-bonded explosive
- ANFO
- Semtex
- Use forms of explosives
