= Sayed Malike =

A New York City cab driver, Sayed Abdul Malike, was arrested in May 2003 after allegedly negotiating a purchase of explosives, armor and drugs with a sting operative, and investigating bridges and ships near Miami, Florida.

== Life ==
Malike legally entered the United States from Afghanistan on September 26, 1996, and was awarded political refugee status in 1998 with help from immigration lawyer Eric Levine. He had also traveled to Italy and Pakistan, and settled in Astoria, Queens. He is married with two children, although his wife lives in Pakistan.

In 2000, he launched a $5,000,000 lawsuit against the Port Authority of New York and New Jersey, complaining his civil rights had been ignored in an altercation with police at the 42nd Street bus station. brought about by being issued a fine for jumping to the front of a line of taxicabs. He allegedly ripped his shirt off and "went berserk", and began banging his head on the car shouting about the "Giuliani Police State", while he claims that officer William Finnie beat him. He told the jurors that he was a lowly immigrant driving a cab to raise funds for a human rights organisation in Afghanistan, but the suit was rejected.

Neighbours reported that he often brought women to his apartment, and grew irate when they made jokes about him being a terrorist and comparing him to Saddam Hussein.

== Investigation ==
On March 21, 2003, he entered a computer shop in Queens, New York and struck up a conversation with the sales clerk about the vastness of the internet, and ended up asking the clerk about finding bombmaking instructions online. The clerk contacted the FBI, sparking an investigation.

On a trip to Florida a week later, Malike boarded a sightseeing vessel in the Port of Miami, and asked Captain John Martin about how close his ship could come to the I-95 bridge above it, where to rent a jet-ski and how close one could come to cruise ships in the area, prompting Martin to contact the Coast Guard with his concerns. The FBI was dispatched and conducted an interview with Malike, who assured them he was just a tourist taking photos with his camera phone, denied having any source of income other than his taxi occupation, left his film with them and was released.

When he returned to New York, he was contacted by the store clerk and directed to undercover agent Joaquin Garcia who posed as an illegal arms dealer. Malike then told Garcia that he wanted to purchase five stolen bulletproof vests, night vision goggles, a "half-case of C-4", Viagra, 50 Valium and 50 sleeping pills, and bulletproof-plating and a camera to mount on his car, stating that he needed the equipment to build a gem mine in Afghanistan and would therefore need enough C-4 "to blow up a mountain", a statement widely repeated in media outlets after his arrest.

On April 18, Garcia brought him "dummy material" packaged in a wooden crate to look like C-4 and told him it would cost $10,000 for his requested collection. Malike declined and said he didn't have the money nor the space to store the stuff currently.

A month later, Malike phoned Garcia and asked him if he could purchase just 100 Valium pills and 50 sleeping pills for $150, and met up with him for a fourth time.

== Arrest ==
Immediately after Renner sold him Valium and placebo sleeping pills, the 43-year-old Malike was arrested on charges of "unlawful possession of Valium" and lying to law enforcement about his interactions with the store clerk, his alleged disinterest in explosives, his purposes in Florida and denying he had other streams of income. He was arraigned the following day.

He was given Heidi Cesare as his court-appointed defence attorney, and was arraigned without bail the following day as federal attorney Catherine Friesen said that his actions suggested he "may either be a terrorist or have delusions of undertaking terrorist-type activities".

He pleaded guilty to the charges of lying to officials and was sentenced to 37 months, which his attorney Alan M. Gardner appealed.
