= Rafiq Ahmed Khan =

Rafiq Ahmed Khan is a retired diplomat and former High Commissioner of Bangladesh to Canada. He was the Consul General of Bangladesh in New York City.

== Career ==
Khan served as a personal assistant in the Permanent Mission of Pakistan to the United Nations in 1967. In 1978, he was the first secretary of the Bangladesh High Commission to the United Kingdom. He served in the permanent mission of Bangladesh to the United Nations. He was the Director General of Europe and the West Wing at the Ministry of Foreign Affairs.

Khan served as the consul general of Bangladesh in New York City.

In April 2004, Khan was appointed High Commissioner of Bangladesh to Canada, replacing Mohsin Ali Khan. In 2005, the government gave him and Dr Iftekhar Ahmed Chowdhury, Permanent Representative of Bangladesh to the United Nations, a one-year extension. He deposited an instrument of accession for Bangladesh to the Convention on the Marking of Plastic Explosives. According to RTV, he prevented the return of Noor Chowdhury, convicted assassin of President Sheikh Mujibur Rahman in the 15 August 1975 Bangladeshi coup d'état. The coup led to Khan's foster father, Khondaker Mostaq Ahmad, becoming the President of Bangladesh. In March 2008, A. M. Yakub Ali replaced him as the High Commissioner of Bangladesh to Canada.

== Personal life ==
Khan's foster father was Khondaker Mostaq Ahmad. He married Juyena.
