= Taggant =

Marker applied to material for detection purposes

A taggant is any chemical or physical marker added to materials to allow various forms of testing or detection. Physical taggants can take many different forms but are typically microscopic in size, included at low levels, and simple to detect. They can be utilized to differentiate authentic product from counterfeits, provide identifying information for traceability purposes (e.g. lot number, company name), determine mixing homogeneity and cross-contamination, and to detect dilution of proprietary products. Taggants are known to be widely used in the animal feed industry, plastics, inks, sheet and flexible explosives, and pharmaceuticals.

An RF taggant is a radio frequency microchip used in automated identification and data capture (see RFID). In such cases, electronic devices use radio waves to track and identify items, such as pharmaceutical products, by assigning individual serial numbers to the containers holding each product. This technology may prevent the diversion or counterfeiting of drugs by allowing wholesalers and pharmacists to determine the identity and dosage of individual products.

A software taggant is a cryptographic signature added to software that enables positive origin identification and integrity of programs. Software taggants use standard PKI techniques (see public key infrastructure) and were introduced by the Industry Connections Security Group of IEEE in an attempt to control proliferation of malware obfuscation via executable compression.

== History ==
The word taggant originates from the trademarked name "Microtaggant Identification Particles". Microtaggants were originally developed by 3M for the post-detonation identification of explosives. In 1985, Microtrace, LLC acquired the technology and began to utilize Microtaggants for anti-counterfeiting and brand protection. Since 1985, the word taggant has become widely utilized and refers to multiple variations.

== Explosive taggants ==
There are two types of taggant which have been considered for use with explosives. One is to help detect the presence of a bomb in, for example, airport screening of luggage; and the other to assist the police in identifying the explosive after the detonation of such a bomb.

=== Detection taggants ===
These are volatile chemicals which will slowly evaporate from the explosive and can be detected in the atmosphere by either detection dogs or specialised machines. They are intended to enhance the detectability of the explosive by instruments or animals thus revealing the presence of a bomb containing the explosive to be detected. Although various technologies exist to detect untagged explosives, detection taggants help to increase their reliability. The inclusion of detection taggants in explosives is mandatory in some countries. Following the bombing of PanAm 103 over Scotland, the International Civil Aviation Organization (ICAO) was instrumental in effecting a worldwide requirement for placing a detection taggant in plastic bonded explosives.

There is a choice between four possible detection taggant chemicals which must be added to plastic explosives under the 1991 International Civil Aviation Organization's Convention on the Marking of Plastic Explosives for the Purpose of Detection. In the United States the marker is always 2,3-dimethyl-2,3-dinitrobutane, usually called DMDNB or DMNB. Dogs are very sensitive to it and can detect as little as 0.5 parts per billion in the air, as can specialised ion mobility spectrometers. Other taggants in use are ethylene glycol dinitrate, known as EGDN and used to mark Semtex, ortho-mononitrotoluene (o-MNT), and para-mononitrotoluene (p-MNT).

=== Identification (or post detonation) taggants ===
These have been considered for introduction in industrial explosives so that the manufacturer and batch number can be determined if they are used illegally. The taggant must survive the detonation of the product and not be contaminated by the environment afterwards. Several different technologies have been considered, but the most common are microscopic polymer/metallic particles. Taggant evidence was crucial in the 1980 conviction of James L. McFillin in Maryland for the 1979 truck bombing murder of Nathan A. Allen, Sr.

A contention claimed for opposing mandated taggants is that most terrorist attacks use homemade explosives (HME) which would allegedly not be tagged. Examples given included, for instance, the 1993 World Trade Center bombing, the Oklahoma City and the Omagh bombings. Contamination of the site is also cited as a problem, since different taggants might be present at a crime scene from, for example, explosives used to obtain the building materials.

Switzerland passed a law in 1980 requiring taggants in explosives manufactured there, and that the code must be changed every six months. So far it is the only country which requires identification taggants. Imported explosives must be tagged only if competing products are also manufactured in Switzerland.

In the United States, the NRA opposed the mandated use of taggants in firearm propellants after tests revealed a dangerous increase in burn rates. It was claimed that a chemical incompatibility with the propellent powders would cause such an increase in pressures that many firearms would burst after using a taggant-laced powder that had been stored for as little as several months. However, these tests were performed on gunpowder with a taggant concentration of 500,000 parts per million (in other words, one-half), which is 2,000 times greater than the official recommended taggant concentration of 250 parts per million.

== Taggants for brand protection ==
When used as a chemical marker, taggants can be used for authentication of products and documents. Taggants are sometimes used by brand owners and governments to authenticate commonly counterfeited items. Taggants are integrated into the material of the item itself or into the packaging. Once integrated, the taggants can only be verified with specially engineered readers.

=== Common taggant anticounterfeiting features ===
- Taggants are uniquely encoded materials or chemistries that act as virtual "fingerprints"
- Taggants can be invisible to the naked eye or visible (covert or overt)
- Taggants can be detectable with specially-engineered equipment or detected with low cost detectors for field testing
- Taggant technology should be extremely difficult to reverse engineer
- Once integrated into an item, taggants should mark the item permanently and should not be removable

=== Common taggant anticounterfeiting applications ===
- Tax Stamp authentication
- Banknote authentication
- Cigarette anticounterfeiting
- Alcohol anticounterfeiting
- Pharmaceutical anticounterfeiting
- Fast-moving consumer goods anticounterfeiting
- Building materials
- Consumer products
