= M. Ataur Rahman (diplomat) =

Bangladeshi diplomat (1924–1991)

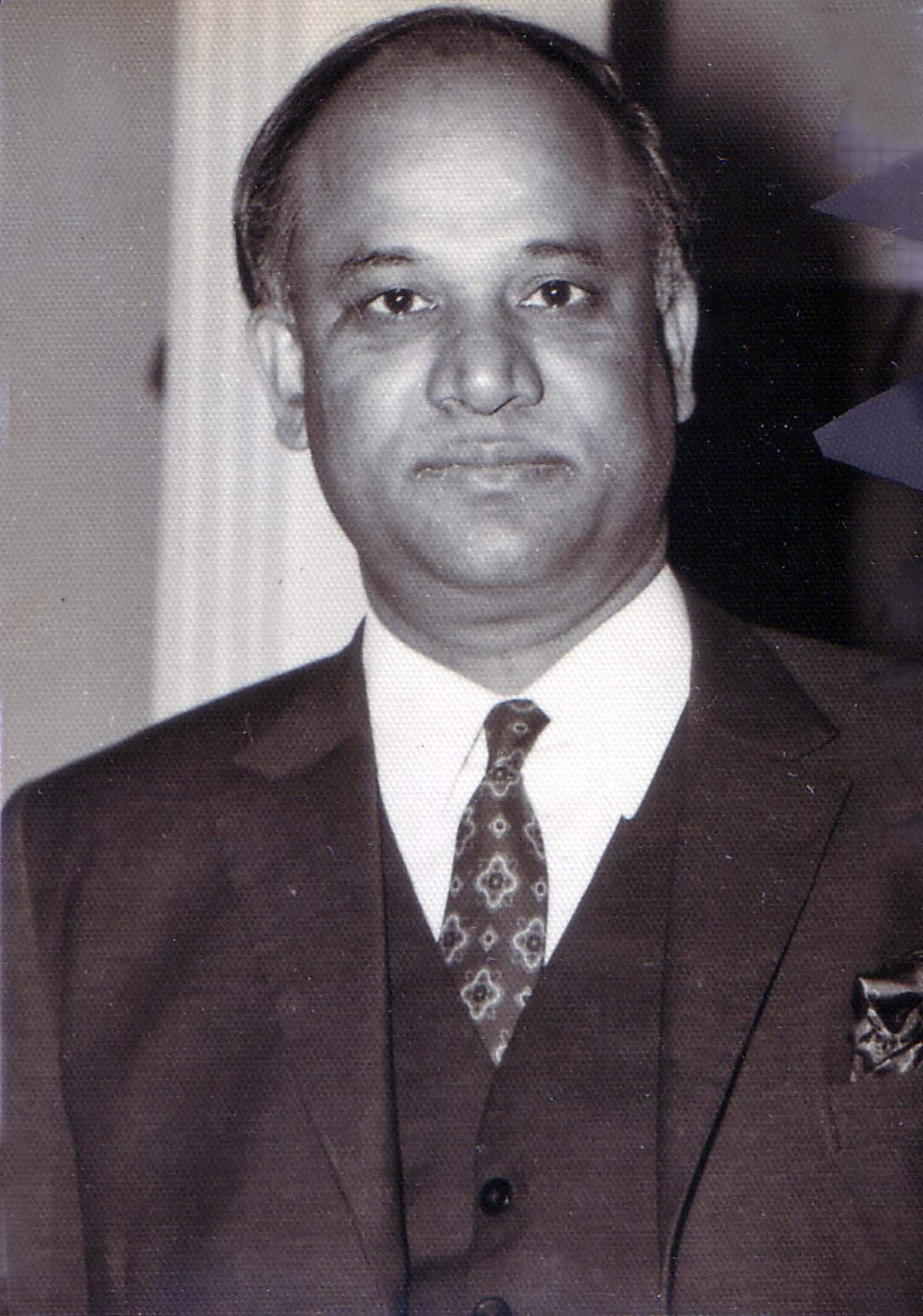

Personal details
- Born: 1 August 1924 Malda District, Bengal Presidency, British India
- Died: 23 March 1991 (aged 66)
- Resting place: Chandipur, Rajshahi, Bangladesh

M. Ataur Rahman (1 August 1924 – 23 March 1991) was a Bangladeshi diplomat. He served as head of Bangladesh's mission in Cairo from August 1973 to February 1976 and subsequently as High Commissioner of Bangladesh to Canada from February 1976.

== Career ==
Rahman entered government service on 5 October 1949 in the Pakistani province of East Bengal. He continued in the foreign service following the independence of Bangladesh in 1971.

In the immediate aftermath of independence, Rahman was assigned responsibilities for diplomatic outreach in West Asia. Contemporary analysis of Bangladesh's early foreign policy identifies him as a career diplomat engaged in the country's regional diplomatic efforts during this period.

From August 1973 to February 1976, Rahman served as head of the Bangladesh mission in Cairo. He was subsequently appointed High Commissioner of Bangladesh to Canada, taking up the post in February 1976.

Later accounts of Bangladesh's diplomatic history note his involvement in the country's engagement with states in the Arab and African regions during its formative years.
