= Semtex =

General purpose plastic explosive

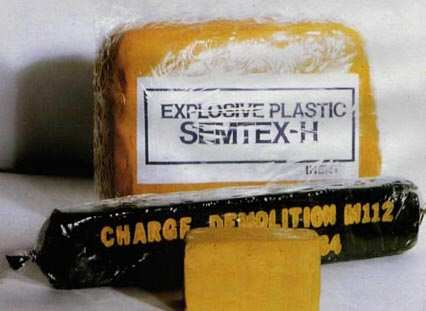
Samples of semtex and other plastic explosives

Semtex is a general-purpose plastic explosive containing RDX and PETN. It is used in commercial blasting, demolition, and in certain military applications.

Semtex was developed and manufactured in Czechoslovakia, originally under the name B 1 and then under the "Semtex" designation since 1964, (Note: Various sources state that production started in 1964 or 1966. Explosia's brief historical document states it was 1964, but most other credible sources state it was in 1966. Most of these also state that development was started at the same time, in response to a request from Vietnam for a counterpart to the United States manufacture of C-4.) labeled as SEMTEX 1A, since 1967 as SEMTEX H, and since 1987 as SEMTEX 10.

Originally developed for Czechoslovak military use and export, Semtex eventually became popular with armed groups and insurgents because, prior to the 2000s, it was extremely difficult to detect, as in the case of Pan Am Flight 103.

== Composition ==
The composition of the two most common variants differ according to their use. The 1A (or 10) variant is used for mining, and is based mostly on crystalline PETN. The versions 1AP and 2P are formed as hexagonal booster charges; a special assembly of PETN and wax inside the charge assures high reliability for detonating cord or detonator. The H (or SE) variant is intended for explosion hardening.

Composition of Semtex
Compound	Semtex 1A	Semtex H	Semtex 2P
PETN	76%	39.3%	58.45%
RDX	4.6%	39.7%	22.9%
binder: styrene-butadiene	9.4%	10.2%	9.2%
plasticizers: n-octyl phthalate, tributyl citrate	9.4%	9.1%	8.45%
antioxidant: N-phenyl-2-naphthylamine	0.6% (includes pigment)	1%	0.5%
pigment	unknown% Sudan IV	0.7% Sudan I	variable

== History ==
Semtex was invented in the late 1950s by Stanislav Brebera and Radim Fukátko, chemists at VCHZ Synthesia, Czechoslovakia (now Czech Republic). The explosive is named after Semtín, a suburb of Pardubice where the mixture was first manufactured starting in 1964. The plant was later renamed to become Explosia a.s., a subsidiary of Synthesia.

Semtex was very similar to other plastic explosives, especially C-4, in being highly malleable; but it is usable over a greater temperature range than other plastic explosives, since it stays plastic between −40 and +60 °C. It is also waterproof. There are visual differences between Semtex and other plastic explosives, too: while C-4 is off-white in colour, Semtex is red or brick-orange.

The new explosive was widely exported, notably to the government of North Vietnam, which received 14 tons during the Vietnam War. However, the main consumer was Libya; about 700 tons of Semtex were exported to Libya between 1975 and 1981 by Omnipol. It has also been used by Islamic militants in the Middle East, and by the IRA and the INLA in Northern Ireland. On 21 December 1988, 340 g (12 ounces) of Semtex brought down a Boeing 747 over Lockerbie, Scotland killing all 259 passengers and crew aboard the aircraft and 11 bystanders on the ground.

Sales declined after Semtex became closely associated with terrorist attacks. Rules governing the explosive's export were progressively tightened over the years, and since 2002 all of Explosia's trading has been controlled by a government ministry. As of 2001, only approximately 10 tons of Semtex were produced annually, almost all for domestic use.

Also in response to international agreements, Semtex has a detection taggant added to produce a distinctive vapor signature to aid detection. First, ethylene glycol dinitrate was used, but was later switched to 2,3-dimethyl-2,3-dinitrobutane (DMDNB) or p-mononitrotoluene (1-methyl-4-nitrobenzene), which is used currently. According to the manufacturer, the taggant agent was voluntarily being added by 1991, years before the protocol became compulsory. Batches of Semtex made before 1990, however, are untagged, though it is not known whether there are still major stocks of such old batches of Semtex. According to the manufacturer, even this untagged Semtex can now be detected. The shelf life of Semtex was reduced from ten years before the 1990s to five years now. Explosia states that there is no compulsory tagging allowing reliable post-detonation detection of a certain plastic explosive (such as incorporating a unique metallic code into the mass of the explosive), so Semtex is not tagged in this way.

On 25 May 1997, Bohumil Šole, a scientist who claimed to have been involved with inventing Semtex, blew himself up with explosives at a spa in Jeseník. Šole, 63, was being treated there for psychological problems. It was unclear what explosives were used. Twenty other people were hurt in the explosion, while six were seriously injured. According to the manufacturer, Explosia, he was not a member of the team that developed the explosive in the 1960s.

According to the producer's 2017 catalog, several variants of Semtex are offered: Semtex 1A, Semtex 1H, Semtex 10, Semtex 10-SE, Semtex S 30, Semtex C-4, Semtex PW 4, and Semtex 90.
