= Explosive vapor detector =

Detection technology

Explosive vapor detectors (EVD) are explosives detection instruments whose principle of operation is the selective analysis of collected vapor samples from the air, in contrast to explosives trace detectors (ETD) which require the physical collection of particulate samples from surfaces. EVDs are not limited to explosives, and may also be used to detect narcotics and other illicit or dangerous substances such as biological agents or chemical warfare agents.

EVDs can be classified into two types: portable EVDs, and pre-concentrated sample EVDs. Portable units have detection limits in the ranges of parts per million or parts per billion, similar to those of ETDs or explosive detection dogs. Pre-concentrated sample EVDs have sensitivities in the range of parts per quadrillion (10^{−15}).

== Principle of operation ==
The detection process is based on two broad steps: sampling and analysis. In portable instruments, sampling and the analysis are done on the same device.

=== Sampling ===
A sample of air is collected from a target volume, which may be the interior truck, pallet, box, or other container, using a vacuum aspiration system. The device that collects this sample is typically known as a "sampler". In portable instruments, the collected air sample is directly injected into the detector. Pre-concentrated sample EVDs, which are stationary and have much higher sensitivities, filter and adsorb high quantities of air and have additional steps prior to analysis.

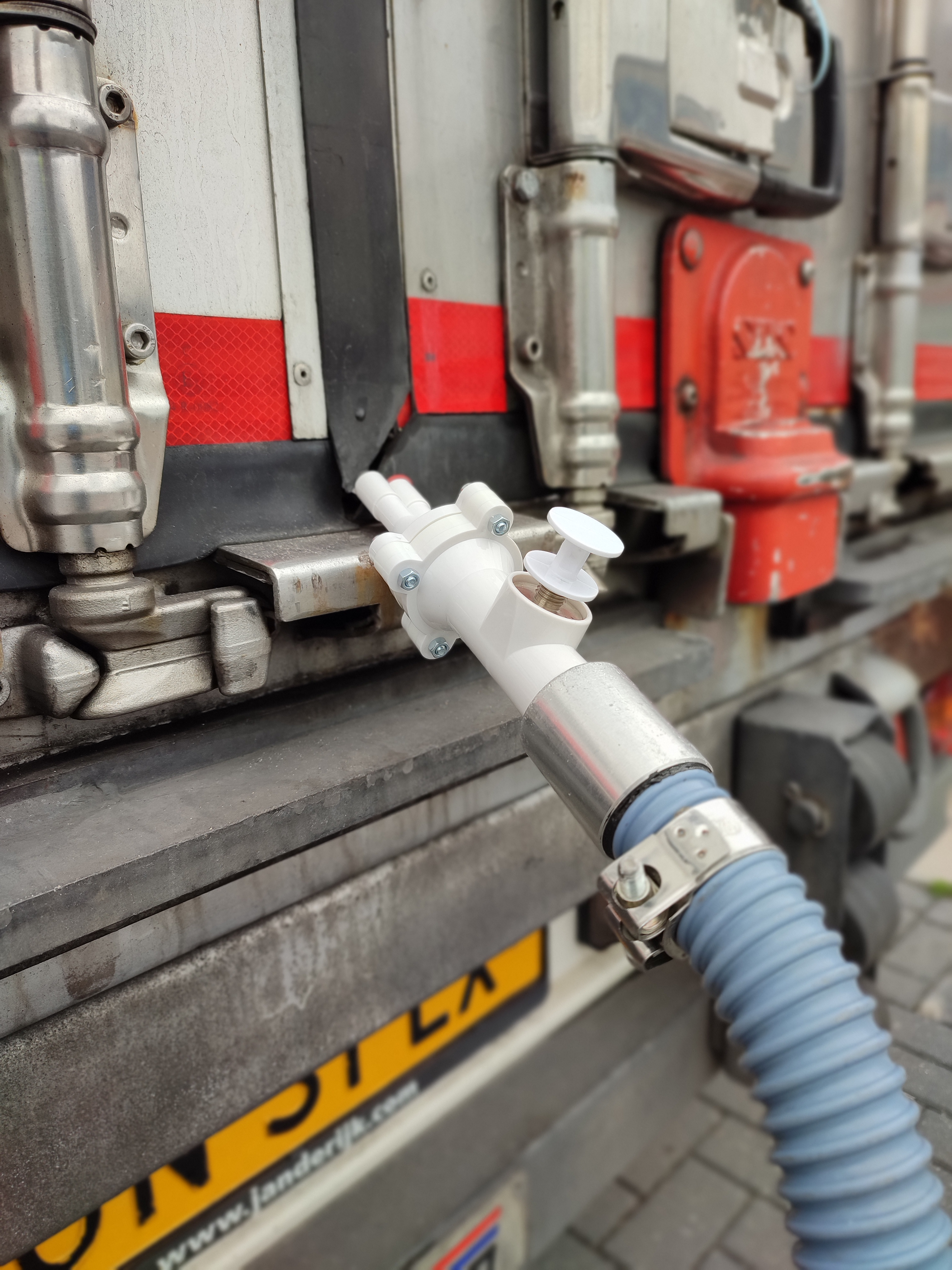
Air sampling pump in an airport

In pre-concentration sample EVDs, the collected air crosses a cartridge where a percentage of the sampled vapors are retained. The cartridge is typically based on a chemical adsorbent such as TENAX or a superabsorbent polymer. In order to survey a large volume, the air sampled is typically collected at a rate of over 100 liters per minute; the type of sampler capable of this high collection rate is termed a high volume sampler (HVS). Once the sample is taken, it is ready for analysis.

=== Analysis ===
In the case of portable instruments, vapors are directly injected into an analyzing device, and in pre-concentrated sample devices, the cartridge containing the sampled air is inserted into the analyzer, where the trapped vapors are released from the sorbent. Common methods of vapor liberation are thermal and laser desorption. In both types of instrument, vapors are carried to an ionization region in a clean gas media, where the vapors are to be ionized. Radioactive sources, secondary electrospray ionization or photoionization are example methods used to ionize collected vapors. These ions are then analyzed; in more sensitive devices, a common technique used for this purpose is mass spectrometry, due to higher requirements in terms of sensitivity and selectivity. If the analysis for explosive vapors is positive, an alarm will result. Most analyses will also provide quantitative concentration levels of the gases detected.

In portable devices, the detector is typically an ion mobility spectrometer.

== Sensitivity and selectivity ==
The number of compounds in a multi-component media, such as the atmosphere, increases exponentially with the partial pressure (p). For instance, when analyzing the atmosphere with a detector sensitive to a partial pressure p = 0.8 atm, only one compound is detectable; at p = 0.01 atm, 5 compounds can be classified, etc. For an analytical instrument to distinguish these components from each other at decreasing p, one needs to increase the sensitivity, as well as the resolution or the selectivity of the sensor. In the case of EVDs, the detection requirements in terms of sensitivity and selectivity are quite demanding, since the vapor pressure of most explosives or drugs is in the order of parts per trillion or even parts per quadrillion. In addition, if the target substance is well packed and wrapped, the vapor pressure is decreased further, typically 3 to 5 orders of magnitude lower. Portable instruments do not have the capacity to detect at this level, and only pre-concentrated sample techniques can reach the requirements to detect these materials at extremely low concentrations.

== Advantages and disadvantages ==
EVDs are often compared to explosives trace detectors (ETDs), as they largely fulfill the same purposes; portable EVDs have similar performance to comparable ETDs, but there are significant differences when comparing the advantages and disadvantages of the stationary pre-concentrated sample EVDs:

=== Advantages ===
- EVD technology allows for the scanning of complete trucks or containers in one analysis, which reduces screening costs significantly versus other techniques, such as imaging or explosives trace detectors, where the cargo must be unloaded and individually screened.
- EVDs generate quantitative results, avoiding human interpretation which is prone to errors, reducing the false alarm rate.
- The extremely high sensitivity results in a high detection rate.
- EVDs preserve the privacy of the items to be scanned, since it is a non-intrusive technology when compared to imaging techniques.

=== Disadvantages ===
- The technical requirements of EVDs are demanding and are typically based on mass spectrometry, so they are expensive instruments. However, long-term operation costs can be lower.
- Vapor pressure is highly dependent on temperature, so the detection capacity of EVDs at low-temperature scenarios (<10 °C (50 °F)) is limited.

== Applications ==
The main application of EVDs is in security. Other applications include atmospheric analysis, food fraud control, demining, and medical applications such as the detection of illnesses like cancer, tuberculosis, or diabetes by breath analysis.

== Regulations ==
The European Civil Aviation Conference approved the implementation of EVDs in the European Union for use in air cargo screening as of March 2023, according to the Commission Implementing Regulation (EU) 2023/566. The regulation entered in force in April 2023, with the main objective to increase the level of security in the EU.
