= A. M. Yakub Ali =

High Commissioner of Bangladesh to Canada
- In office March 2008 – September 2012
- Preceded by: Rafiq Ahmed Khan
- Succeeded by: Kamrul Ahsan

High Commissioner of Bangladesh to Sri Lanka
- In office 6 June 2003 – 11 July 2006
- Preceded by: Ashraf-ud-Doula
- Succeeded by: Md Shahdat Hossain

A. M. Yakub Ali is a retired diplomat and former High Commissioner of Bangladesh to Canada. He is the former High Commissioner of Bangladesh to Kenya and Sri Lanka.

== Career ==
Ali is a veteran of the Bangladesh Liberation War of 1971.

Ali joined the foreign affairs cadre of the Bangladesh Civil Service in 1981. He has served in Bangladesh embassies in Morocco, France, and the United States. He was the Permanent Delegate of Bangladesh to UNESCO in France. He was the second secretary at the Embassy of Bangladesh in France. He was the Minister (political) at the Bangladesh Embassy in the United States. He was then the Counselor (Head of Chancery) at the Embassy. He was an advisor to the World Bank.

Ali was the High Commissioner of Bangladesh to Sri Lanka. In April 2006, he was appointed the High Commissioner of Bangladesh to Kenya.

Ali was appointed High Commissioner of Bangladesh to Canada in March 2008, replacing Rafiq Ahmed Khan. In May 2011, he received Prime Minister Sheikh Hasina in Canada. He told the Prothom Alo that it would not be possible to extradite SHBM Nur Chowdhury from Canada, according to a letter sent by Lawrence Cannon, Minister of Foreign Affairs of Canada, to Dipu Moni, Bangladesh's Minister of Foreign Affairs. In September 2012, Kamrul Ahsan replaced him as the High Commissioner of Bangladesh to Canada.

Ali is a member of the Association of Former Ambassadors.

== Personal life ==
Ali is married to Mehera Yakub.
