= Saiful Hoque =

Bangladeshi diplomat

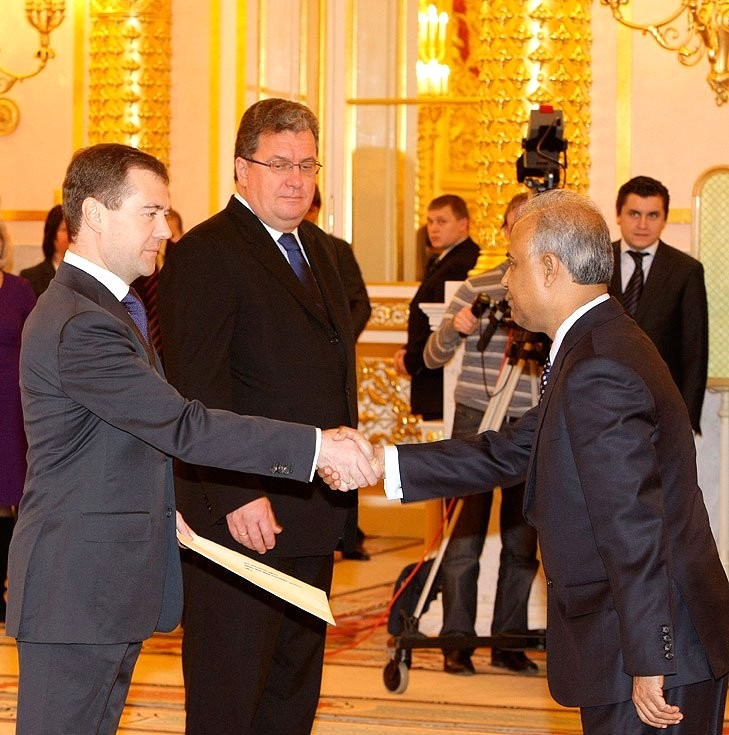
- Hoque presenting his credentials to Dmitry Medvedev (2009)

Ambassador of Bangladesh to Russia
- In office 26 August 2009 – 24 December 2019
- Preceded by: Mohamed Mijarul Quayes
- Succeeded by: Kamrul Ahsan

Personal details
- Education: Taras Shevchenko National University of Kyiv

S. M. Saiful Hoque is a Bangladeshi diplomat and businessperson. He was Ambassador of Bangladesh to Russia from 2009 to 2019.

Hoque graduated from Taras Shevchenko National University of Kyiv, Ukraine in 1979.

Hoque served as the director, International Programme Development of Human Development Research Centre (HDRC) since 1999.

Hoque is also an Advisor of Bangladesh Center for Culture, Science and Information in St. Petersburg, Russia.

During the celebration of the 49th Independence and National Day of the People's Republic of Bangladesh at the Sri Lankan embassy in Moscow on 28 March 2019, Hoque expressed gratitude toward the Russian Navy sailors who helped to clear the Chittagong harbor of mines and sunken ships after ties between the Soviet Union and Bangladesh were established in 1971.
