= Inscentinel =

Inscentinel was a British firm based at Rothamsted Experimental Station in Hertfordshire. They specialise in the development of insect olfaction technologies for the detection of trace chemicals, specifically Hymenoptera training techniques and technologies.

== History ==
Inscentinel was founded in 2000, and was a spin-out resulting from a joint venture project between Unilever and Rothamsted Research. The firm was backed with venture capital, funding from the British Government, and other investment.

== Technology ==
Conventionally, detection of chemicals at low vapour pressures has been based on mass spectrometry, gas chromatography and the use of sniffer dogs. Insect olfaction is sensitive down to parts per trillion and the use of insects to conduct searches for illegal drugs, and explosives—particularly in security applications such as demining—is envisaged. The technology has been tested by QinetiQ for Geneva International Centre for Humanitarian Demining. Potential health uses are also reported, such as for TB. Inscentinel is a patent holder. The species of bee used is Apis mellifera.
