= Mohsin Ali Khan =

Bangladeshi diplomat

Mohsin Ali Khan is a Bangladeshi diplomat and former Foreign Secretary. He is the former high commissioner of Bangladesh to Canada. He was the executive director of Bangladesh Legal Aid and Services Trust.

== Early life ==
Khan was born to Rokeya Khan. He has two siblings, Shawkat Ali Khan, and Masud Khan.

== Career ==
In 1988, Khan was a director of the Ministry of Foreign Affairs. He was the Alternate Permanent Representative to Food and Agriculture Organization of the United Nations in Rome. He served as the political counsellor of the Bangladesh Embassy in Rome.

In October 2000, Khan was ambassador to Uzbekistan. Khan was the consul general of Bangladesh in New York City.

In February 2002, Khan was appointed the high commissioner of Bangladesh to Canada.

Rafiq Ahmed Khan replaced Khan as the high commissioner of Bangladesh to Canada in November 2003 as Khan was set to retire.

Khan was the executive director of Bangladesh Legal Aid and Services Trust.
