= Explosives trace detector =

Device detecting tiny amounts of explosives

Explosive trace detectors (ETD) are explosive detection equipment able to detect explosives of small magnitude. The detection is accomplished by sampling non-visible "trace" amounts of particulates. Devices similar to ETDs are also used to detect narcotics. The equipment is used mainly in airports and other vulnerable areas considered susceptible to acts of unlawful interference.

== Characteristics ==
=== Sensitivity ===
Detection limit is defined as the lowest amount of explosive matter a detector can detect reliably. It is expressed in terms of nano-grams (ng), pico-grams (pg) or femto-grams (fg) with fg being better than pg better than ng. It can also be expressed in terms of parts per billion (ppb), parts per trillion (ppt) or parts per quadrillion (ppq).

Sensitivity is important because most explosives have a low vapor pressure . The detector with the highest sensitivity is the best in detecting vapors of explosives reliably.

=== Light weight ===
Portable explosive detectors need to be as light weight as possible to allow users to not fatigue when holding them. Also, light weight detectors can easily be placed on top of robots.

=== Size ===
Portable explosive detectors need to be as small as possible to allow for sensing of explosives in hard to reach places like under a car or inside a trash bin.

=== Cold start up time and analysis time ===
The start up time for any trace detector is the time required by the detector to reach the optimized temperature for detection of contraband substances.

== Technologies ==
=== Colorimetrics ===
The use of colorimetric test kits for explosive detection is one of the oldest, simplest, and most widely used methods for the detection of explosives. Colorimetric detection of explosives involves applying a chemical reagent to an unknown material or sample and observing a color reaction. Common color reactions are known and indicate to the user if there is an explosive material present and in many cases the group of explosive from which the material is derived. The major groups of explosives are nitroaromatic explosives, nitrate ester and nitramine explosives, improvised explosives not containing nitro groups which includes inorganic nitrate based explosives, chlorate based explosives, and peroxide based explosives.

=== Immunoassay ===
Explosive detection immunoassay is a sensitive, antibody-based analytical method used to identify trace amounts of energetic compounds like TNT, RDX, PETN, and HMX in environmental samples, forensic scenes, or security screening. It relies on specific antigen-antibody binding reactions translated into optical or colorimetric signals.

- Lateral Flow Immunoassays (LFIA): Portable, paper- or membrane-based strips (similar to home test kits) that use colloidal gold or chemiluminescent labels for rapid on-site screening.
- Displacement Flow Biosensors: Systems where target explosives in a sample flow through a column or capillary and displace fluorescently labeled antigens bound to immobilized antibodies.
- ELISA (Enzyme-Linked Immunosorbent Assay): Laboratory- or field-adapted microplate/kit tests offering high sensitivity down to picogram or femtomole levels.
- Surface Plasmon Resonance (SPR) Immunosensors: Real-time, label-free optical biosensors that track antibody-antigen binding kinetics for trace explosives like TNT.

=== Ion mobility spectrometry ===
Explosive detection using ion mobility spectrometry (IMS) is based on velocities of ions in a uniform electric field. There are some variant to IMS such as Ion trap mobility spectrometry (ITMS) or Non-linear dependence on ion mobility (NLDM) which are based on IMS principle. The sensitivity of devices using this technology is limited to pg levels. The technology also requires the ionization of sample explosives which is accomplished by a radioactive source such as nickel-63 or americium-241. This technology is found in most commercially available explosive detectors such as the GE VaporTracer, Smith Sabre 4000 and Russian built MO-2M and MO-8. The presence of radioactive materials in these equipments cause regulatory hassles and requires special permissions at customs ports. These detectors cannot be field serviced and may pose radiation hazard to the operator if the casing of the detector cracks due to mishandling. Bi-yearly checks are mandatory on such equipment in most countries by regulating agencies to ensure that there are no radiation leaks. Disposal of these equipments is also controlled owing to the high half-life of the radioactive material used.

Electrospray ionization, mobility analysis (DMA) and tandem mass spectrometry (MS/MS) is used by SEDET (Sociedad Europea de Detección) for the “Air Cargo Explosive Screener (ACES)”, targeted to aviation cargo containers currently under development in Spain.

=== Nuclear quadrupole resonance ===
Nuclear quadrupole resonance (NQR) is a radio-frequency spectroscopic technique used to detect and identify explosive materials—such as RDX, TNT, and HMX—by targeting nitrogen-14 (N^{14}) nuclei without needing an external magnetic field.

=== Lab-on-a-chip ===
A lab-on-a-chip (LOC) platform combining immunoassays with microfluidics enables rapid, portable, and ultra-sensitive detection of trace explosives (such as TNT, DNT, and related energetic materials) or associated threat agents.

=== Thermo redox ===
This technology is based on decomposition of explosive substance followed by the reduction of the nitro groups. Most military grade explosives are nitro compounds and have an abundance of NO_{2} groups on them. Explosive vapors are pulled into an adsorber at a high rate and then pyrolized. The presence of nitro groups in the pyrolized products is then detected. This technology has significantly more false alarms because many other harmless compounds also have an abundance of nitro groups. For example, most fertilizers have nitro groups which are falsely identified as explosives, and the sensitivity of this technology is also fairly low. A popular detector using this technology is Scintrex Trace EVD 3000.

=== Laser-induced breakdown spectroscopy ===
Laser-induced breakdown spectroscopy (LIBS) is a rapid, in-situ analytical technique used to detect and identify chemical explosives through laser-generated microplasmas.

=== Chemiluminescence ===
This technology is based on the luminescence of specific compounds when they bind to explosive particles. Its sensitivity can reach the nanogram (ppb) level. It can be applied in non-electronic formats, such as sprays and test papers, as well as in electronic devices.

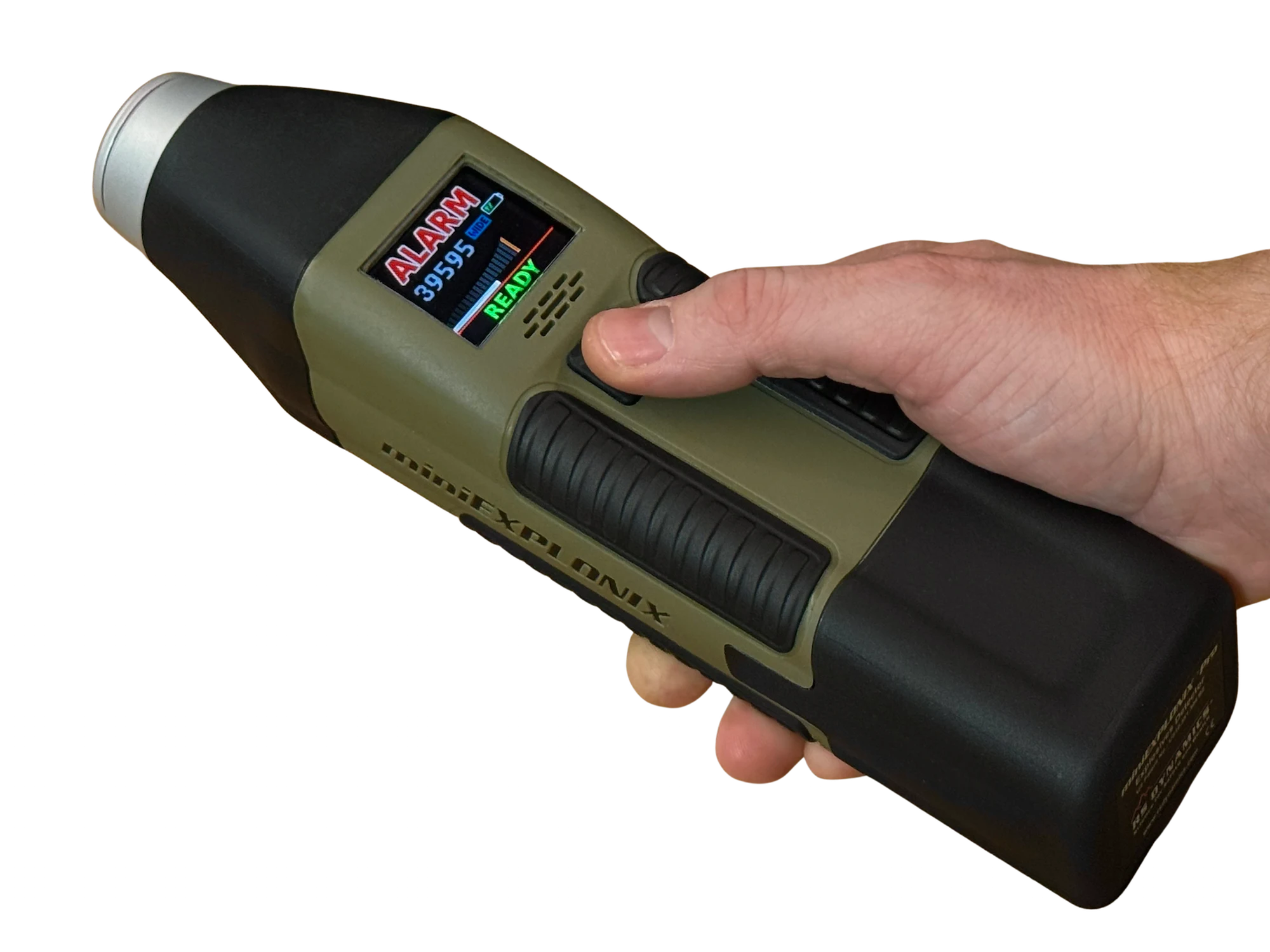
miniEXPLONIX Pro - swiss made fast & reliable explosive trace detector for field use with simple control

A key advantage of chemiluminescence-based electronic devices is their high reliability and resistance to interference from substances such as perfumes, dirt, and human sweat, as well as their ability to operate effectively under challenging environmental conditions, including variations in temperature and humidity. Therefore they are very capable in the field. These devices does not uses radioactive ionizing source.

These features are enabled by IRSSIL technology developed by RS DYNAMICS, powering the compact yet fast and capable miniEXPLONIX Pro detector, as well as the advanced EXPLONIX 2 analyzer.

=== Terahertz spectroscopy ===
THz radiation (0.3–10 THz) penetrates nonmetallic and nonpolar barriers like clothing, paper, and cardboard, interacting with unique low-energy intramolecular and phonon vibrational modes that act as spectral fingerprints for explosives.

=== Gamma-ray spectroscopy ===
Inertial Electrostatic Confinement (IEC) fusion devices detect explosives by using compact, tabletop D-D (deuterium-deuterium) fusion reactions to emit 2.45 MeV fast neutrons.

=== Amplifying fluorescent polymer ===
Amplifying fluorescent polymer (AFP) is a promising new technology and is based on synthesized polymers which bind to explosive molecules and give an amplified signal upon detection. When compounds that are not polymers are utilized for such purpose, the quenching of the fluorescence by the traces of explosives is not detectable. When amplifying fluorescent polymer in thin films absorbs a photon of light, excited state polymers (excitons) are able to migrate along the polymer backbone and between the adjacent polymer films. These sensors were originally made in order to detect trinitrotoluene. In AFP, binding of one TNT molecule results in quenching of fluorescence significantly due to the conjugated structure of the polymers. It has been reported that in practice the polymers result in 100-1000 fold increase of amplification of the quenching response.

"During its excited state lifetime, the exciton propagates by a random walk through a finite volume of the polymer film." Once TNT, or any other electron-deficient (i.e., electron accepting) molecule comes in contact with the polymer, a so-called low-energy ‘trap’ forms. "If the exciton migrates to the site of the bound electron-deficient molecule before transitioning back to the ground state, the exciton will be trapped (a non-radioactive process), and no fluorescence will be observed from the excitation event. Since the exciton samples many potential analyte binding sites during its excited state lifetime, the probability that the exciton will sample an occupied ‘receptor’ site and be quenched is greatly increased."

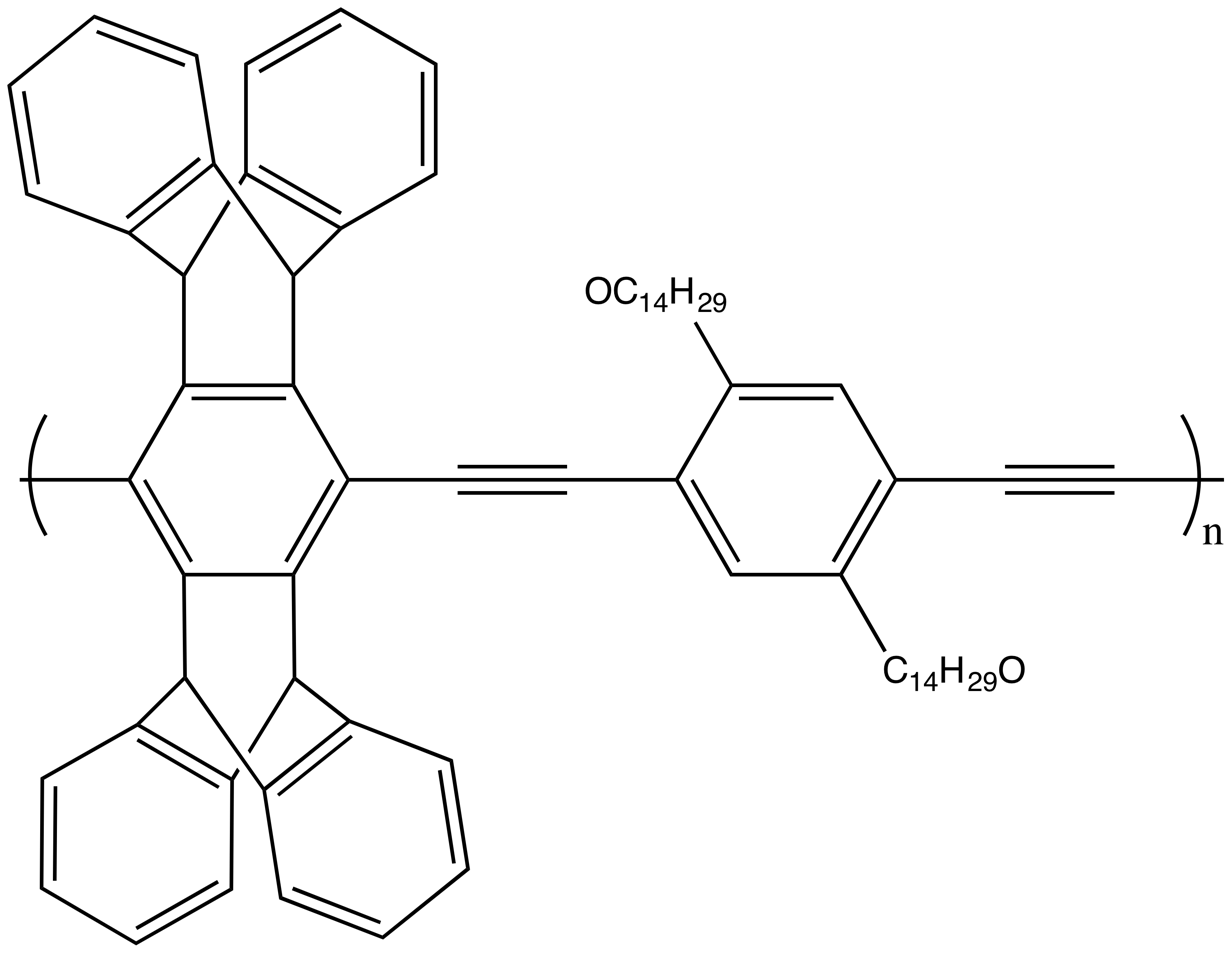
An example of an amplifying fluorescent polylmer

The explosive trace detectors utilizing AFPs, known as Fido Explosives Detectors, were originally developed under the Defense Advanced Research Projects Agency (DARPA) Dog’s Nose program and is now produced by FLIR Systems. The current generation, provides broad-band trace explosive detection and weighs less than 3 lbs. The sensitivity is in the order of femtogram (1 × 10^{−15} grams). This is the only such technology in the field that can achieve such sensitivity.

=== Mass spectrometry ===
Recently, mass spectrometry (MS) has emerged as another ETD technology. Adoption of mass spectrometry should lower false alarms rates often associated with ETD due to the higher resolution of the core technology. It also uses a non-radioactive ionization method generally secondary electrospray ionization (SESI-MS). Primarily used in desktop ETD systems, mass spectrometry can be miniaturized for handheld ETD.

=== Photoacoustic spectroscopy ===
A laser beam tuned to a specific absorption line of a target gas passes through a gas sample. When the laser intensity is modulated, the gas molecules absorb the light and release thermal energy via non-radiative relaxation, creating periodic acoustic pressure waves.The acoustic pressure waves force the prongs of the quartz tuning fork (QTF) to vibrate. Because quartz is piezoelectric, this mechanical deflection converts directly into an electrical voltage or current signal.
