= Abdul Momin (diplomat) =

Bangladeshi diplomat (1921–2007)

Personal details
- Born: 10 March 1921 Udrajpur, Dagonbhuyian, Feni, British India
- Died: 1 December 2007 (aged 86) Dhaka, Bangladesh
- Occupation: Diplomat, civil servant
- Known for: Diplomatic service during and after Bangladesh Liberation War

Abdul Momin (10 March 1921 – 1 December 2007) was a Bangladeshi diplomat and civil servant. He played a significant role during the Bangladesh Liberation War in 1971 by severing ties with the Government of Pakistan and pledging allegiance to the Provisional Government of Bangladesh. Momin later served as ambassador and held the position of Permanent Secretary of the Ministry of Foreign Affairs in Bangladesh.

== Early life ==
Momin was born on 10 March 1921 in Udrajpur, Daganbhuiyan Upazila, Feni District, East Bengal, British India. He did his bachelor's degree in history at Presidency College, Kolkata. His older brother, Abdur Rashid, was secretary of the government of Pakistan. His nephews, Harunur Rashid and Mamunur Rashid, were civil servants who contributed to the Bangladesh Liberation War. Like him, his younger brother, Abdur Razzak, joined the Pakistan Foreign Service and later served as the ambassador of Bangladesh to Sweden.

== Career ==
Momin joined the Bengal Civil Service in 1946, later transitioning into the Pakistan Foreign Service in 1950. Over the years, he served in various diplomatic missions in Rangoon, Washington, D.C., Baghdad, Shillong, Brussels, and Lisbon. In 1970, he was appointed as Pakistan's ambassador to Argentina.

During the Bangladesh Liberation War in 1971, Momin publicly declared his allegiance to Bangladesh. He was one of three ethnic Bengali ambassadors of Pakistan who defected along with Abul Fateh and Khurram Khan Panni. Following his declaration, he undertook assignments for the Mujibnagar government and continued to work in the foreign service of the newly independent nation.

Following independence, he became the Permanent Secretary of the Ministry of Foreign Affairs. He the appointed the first High Commissioner of Bangladesh to Canada in 1972. He also served as ambassador to China and France.

== Death ==
Momin died on 1 December 2007. Chief Adviser Fakhruddin Ahmed and Foreign Affairs Adviser Iftekhar Ahmed Chowdhury expressed his condolences and acknowledged Momin's role in establishing the foundation of Bangladesh's foreign policy.
