= Mine A.P. Improvised Type I =

- Type: Anti-personnel mine
- Place of origin: Great Britain

Service history
- Used by: Great Britain
- Wars: World War II

Specifications
- Length: 5 inches
- Width: 5 inches
- Height: 2 inches
- Filling: Nobel's 808
- Filling weight: 9 ounces

The Mine A.P. Improvised Type I was a British Anti-personnel mine of World War II.

== Design ==
=== Parts ===
The mine casing is a wooden hinged box divided into two parts the front and back of the box. The front contains the percussion igniter and is a smaller compartment than the back compartment which contains the fuse, detonator, primer and explosive charge of 9 ounces of Nobel's 808 explosive. Holes drilled through hinged box ensure all the internal parts can be fitted. A slot is cut out at the upper front of the box to allow the igniter which sticks out the front end to fit.2 staples in the upper part of the box takes an arming pin also embedded in the igniter pin.

=== Detonation process ===
Downwards pressure on the mine pushes the ignition pin out the mine. This releases the striker which impacts the percussion cap. This ignites the fuse which activates the detonator which ignited the primer which triggers the 9 ounces of Nobel's 808 explosive.

=== Arming and disarming ===
To arm the mine first place 2 four ounce charges in the back compartment of the mine. Then put a small amount of orange fuse in the fuse adapter. Then apply No 27 detonator to the remaking end of the fuse. Then insert the detonation mechanism (what makes it blow up fuse and ignition, detonator etc) that is currently outside the mine in through holes in the mine. Insert the gunpowder primer between the explosives. Then insert the detonator in the primer. Shut the mine lid and then insert the arming pin through the staples and into the ignition pin. Then the mine is armed. To disarm the mine pretty much reverse the process take out the arming pin take out the detonation mechanism and cut the orange fuse and then the mine is disarmed.

== History ==
This mine was designed and highly manufactured by 38th field park company Royal engineers. So as they were manufactured so much it would have probably been in a fair amount of use.
