= Kamrul Ahsan =

- কামরুল আহসান
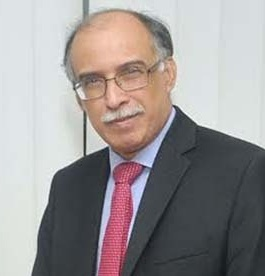
- Ahsan in 2016

Ambassador of Bangladesh to Russia
- In office 5 January 2020 – 14 September 2024
- Preceded by: Saiful Hoque
- Succeeded by: Md. Nazrul Islam

High Commissioner of Bangladesh to Canada
- In office September 2012 – May 2016
- Preceded by: A. M. Yakub Ali
- Succeeded by: Mizanur Rahman

High Commissioner of Bangladesh to Singapore
- In office 3 August 2007 – 5 September 2012
- Preceded by: Munshi Faiz Ahmed
- Succeeded by: Mahbub Uz Zaman

Personal details
- Education: Bangladesh University of Engineering and Technology

Kamrul Ahsan, a career foreign service officer, served as Bangladesh Ambassador to the Russian Federation from January 2020 to September 2024. During his tenure in Moscow, he was also concurrently accredited as his country's Ambassador to Belarus and Kazakhstan. Before joining in his position in Moscow, he served as Secretary for Bilateral and Consular Affairs in the Ministry of Foreign Affairs of Bangladesh.

Kamrul Ahsan also served as his country's high commissioner to Canada (September 2012 to May 2016), and Singapore (August 2007 to August 2012).

He was concurrently accredited as Bangladesh Ambassador to Argentina, Cuba, Venezuela and Jamaica from 2012 to 2016 with residence in Ottawa.

== Early life and education ==
Kamrul Ahsan was born at Noakhali in Bangladesh. He attended elementary and middle school in Comilla at Our Lady of Fatima High School and Comilla Zilla School respectively. He studied at Dhaka College at higher secondary level. He obtained his Bachelor of Science degree in Civil Engineering from Bangladesh University of Engineering and Technology (BUET) in 1984.

He also studied at Beijing Language and Culture University in China (1989–1991) and attended a course on security issues at the Asia Pacific Center for Security Studies in Hawaii, US (2000).

== Career ==
Ahsan worked as an Assistant Engineer at the Bangladesh Rural Electrification Board before joining the Ministry of Foreign Affairs of Bangladesh as an Assistant Secretary in 1988.

In his first diplomatic assignment, from 1992 to 1995, he served as Second Secretary and First Secretary at Bangladesh Embassy in Beijing, China. From 1995 to 1999, he served at Bangladesh High Commission in London, United Kingdom initially as First Secretary and later as Counsellor.

At headquarters in Dhaka from 1999 to 2001, he served as Director (Personnel), Director (South Asia and SAARC) and Director (Foreign Secretary's Office).

From 2001 to 2003, he served initially as Counsellor and then as the Deputy Chief of the Mission at the Bangladesh Embassy in Washington DC, United States. In September 2003, he was appointed as Bangladesh Consul General for Dubai and Northern Emirates, United Arab Emirates where he served till August 2007.

Kamrul Ahsan represented Bangladesh at different international negotiations. He was in the drafting group for Least Developed Countries (LDCs) during the Framework Convention on Climate Change Meetings in Geneva. He was Bangladesh delegate to the International Maritime Organization from 1996 to 1999. He attended the IISS Shangri La Dialogue, Asia's premier security summit, at Singapore from 2008 to 2012.

He also helped to form Bangladesh Business Chamber of Singapore.

== Honours ==
Kamrul Ahsan was the Dean of the Diplomatic and Consular Corps in Singapore. In Canada, he also served as the Dean of the Asia Pacific Diplomatic Corps.

Kamrul Ahsan was a member of the Board of Governors of Bangladesh Institute of International and Strategic Studies (BIISS). He is a Life Fellow of the Institution of Engineers, Bangladesh.

He contributed to a book titled ’Little Red Dot, The: Reflections Of Foreign Ambassadors On Singapore - Volume III’ published by Institute of Public Policy, Singapore.

== Personal ==
Kamrul Ahsan is married to Saira Nazneen Ahsan and has two sons - Zoheb Ahsan and Aaryan Ahsan.
