= Convention on the Marking of Plastic Explosives =

1991 multilateral anti-terrorism treaty

Convention on the Marking of Plastic Explosives for the Purpose of Detection
- Type: Anti-terrorism, aviation
- Signed: 1 March 1991
- Location: Montreal, Canada
- Effective: 21 June 1998
- Condition: 35 ratifications
- Parties: 155
- Depositary: Secretary-General of the International Civil Aviation Organization
- Languages: English, French, Russian, Spanish, and Arabic

The Convention on the Marking of Plastic Explosives for the Purpose of Detection is a multilateral anti-terrorism treaty that aims to prohibit and prevent the manufacture or storage of unmarked plastic explosives.

== Content ==
A state that ratifies the Convention agrees to prohibit the manufacture, storage, transport, or entry of unmarked plastic explosives in its territory. Plastic explosives are not prohibited by the treaty, but it mandates that when they are produced they are marked with a chemical taggant (specified in the treaty's Technical Annex) which can facilitate future identification purposes.

The Convention also establishes an International Explosives Technical Commission, which is composed of experts in the field of explosives manufacturing and explosives detection. The Commission can propose amendments to the Technical Annex of the treaty.

== Conclusion and ratifications ==
The Convention was concluded at the ICAO International Conference on Air Law in Montreal on 1 March 1991. It entered into force on 21 June 1998 after it had been ratified by 35 signatory states.

As of October 2018, the Convention has been ratified by 155 states, made up of 154 United Nations member states plus Niue.
