= DMDNB =

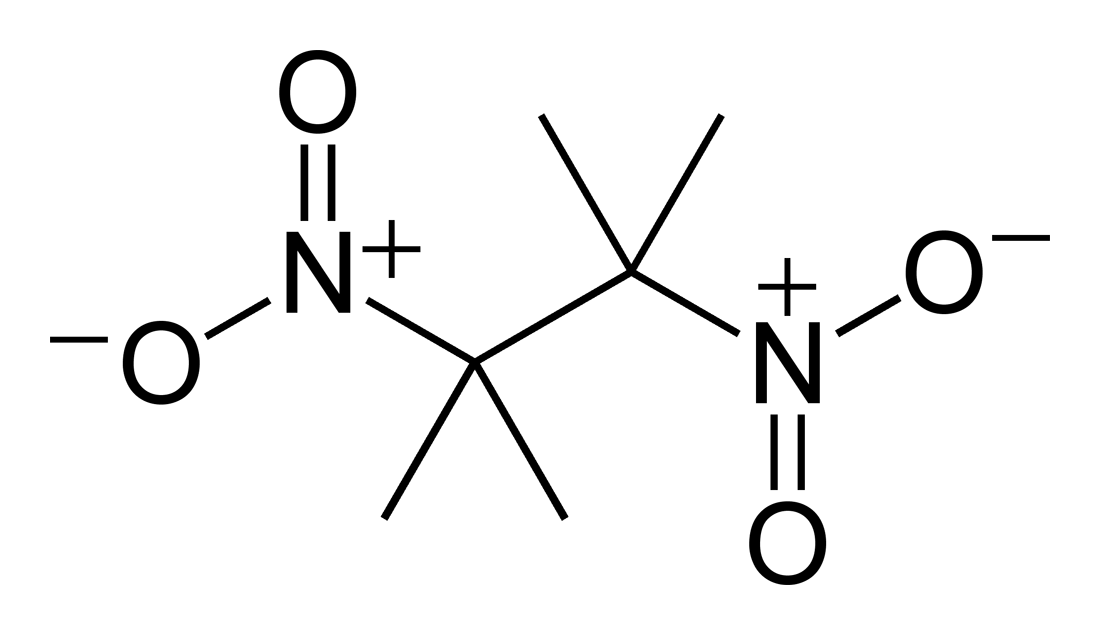

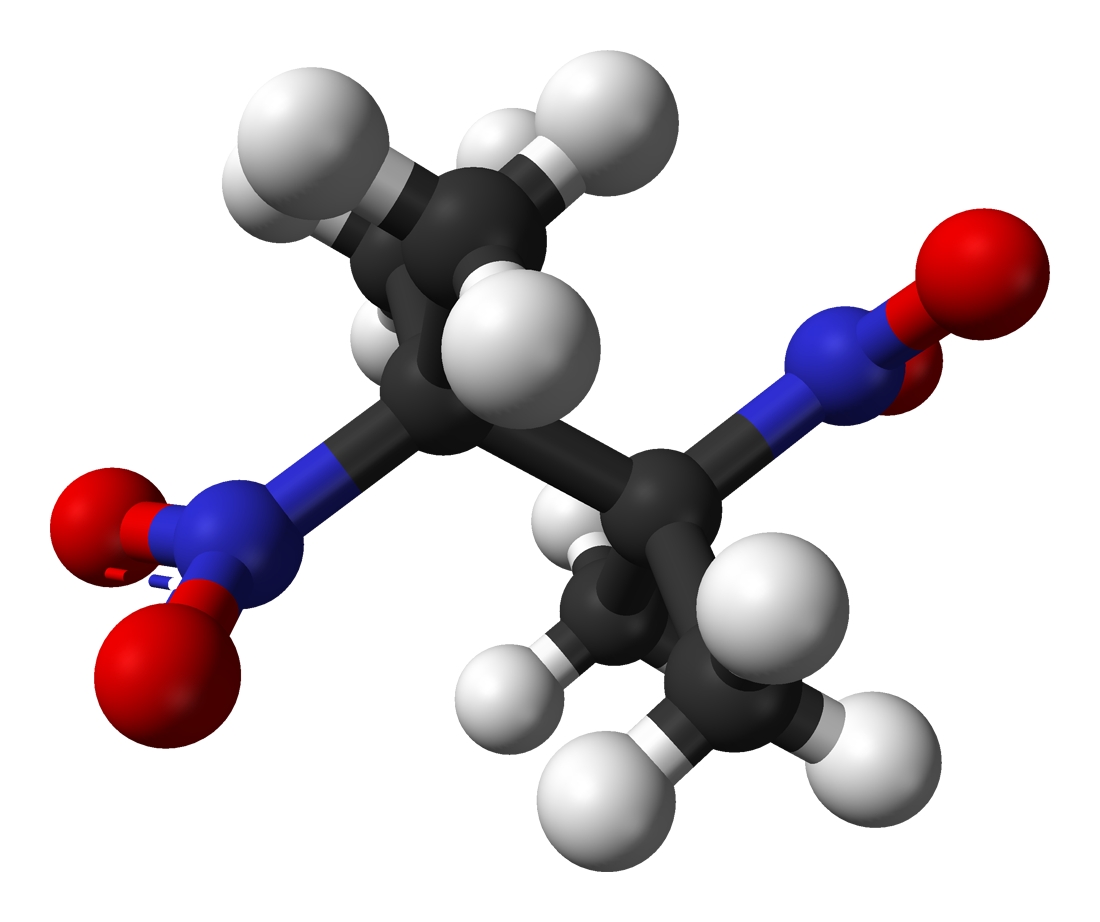

Names
- Preferred IUPAC name 2,3-Dimethyl-2,3-dinitrobutane
- Other names 2,3-Dimethyl-2,3-dinitro-n-butane, DMDNB, DMNB

Identifiers
CAS Number	3964-18-9
3D model (JSmol)	Interactive image
ChemSpider	69982
ECHA InfoCard	100.021.428
PubChem CID	77577
CompTox Dashboard (EPA)	DTXSID4063248
- InChI: InChI=1/C6H12N2O4/c1-5(2,7(9)10)6(3,4)8(11)12/h1-4H3 Key: DWCLXOREGBLXTD-UHFFFAOYAA
- SMILES: CC(C)(C(C)(C)[N+](=O)[O-])[N+](=O)[O-]

Properties
Chemical formula	C_{6}H_{12}N_{2}O_{4}
Molar mass	176.172 g·mol^{−1}
Melting point	210 to 214 °C (410 to 417 °F; 483 to 487 K)
- Except where otherwise noted, data are given for materials in their standard state (at 25 °C [77 °F], 100 kPa). Infobox references

DMDNB, or also DMNB, chemically 2,3-dimethyl-2,3-dinitrobutane, is a volatile organic compound used as a detection taggant for explosives, mostly in the United States where it is virtually the only such taggant in use. Dogs are very sensitive to it and can detect as little as 0.5 parts per billion in the air, as can specialised ion mobility spectrometers. Its presence allows more reliable explosive detection.
