= Plastic explosive =

Type of explosive material

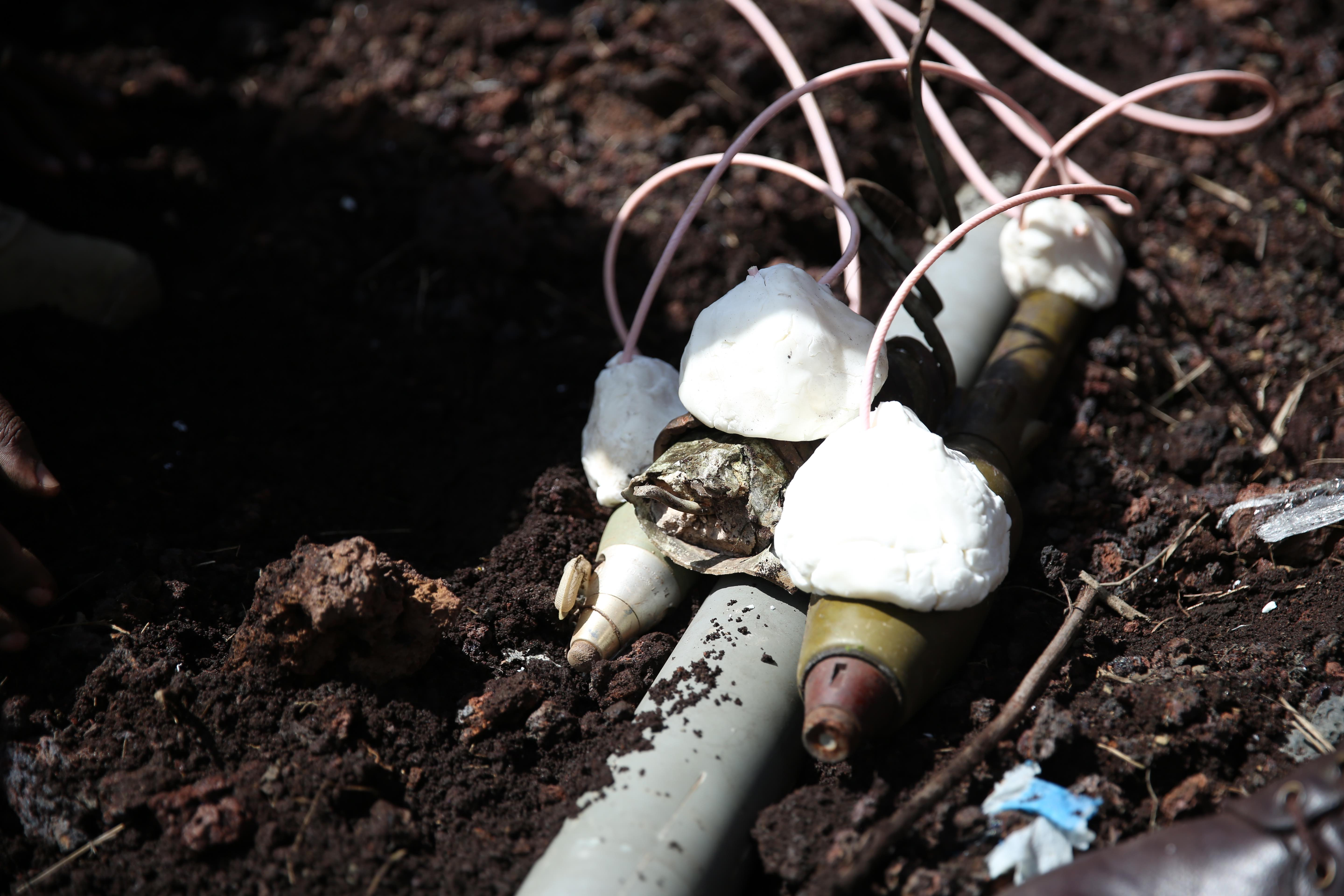
Disposal of munitions with plastic explosives; note the malleability of the white plastic explosive charges

Plastic explosive is a soft and hand-moldable solid form of explosive material. Within the field of explosives engineering, plastic explosives are also known as putty explosives.

Plastic explosives are especially suited for explosive demolition. Common plastic explosives include Semtex and C-4. The first manufactured plastic explosive was gelignite, invented in 1875 by Alfred Nobel.

== Usage ==
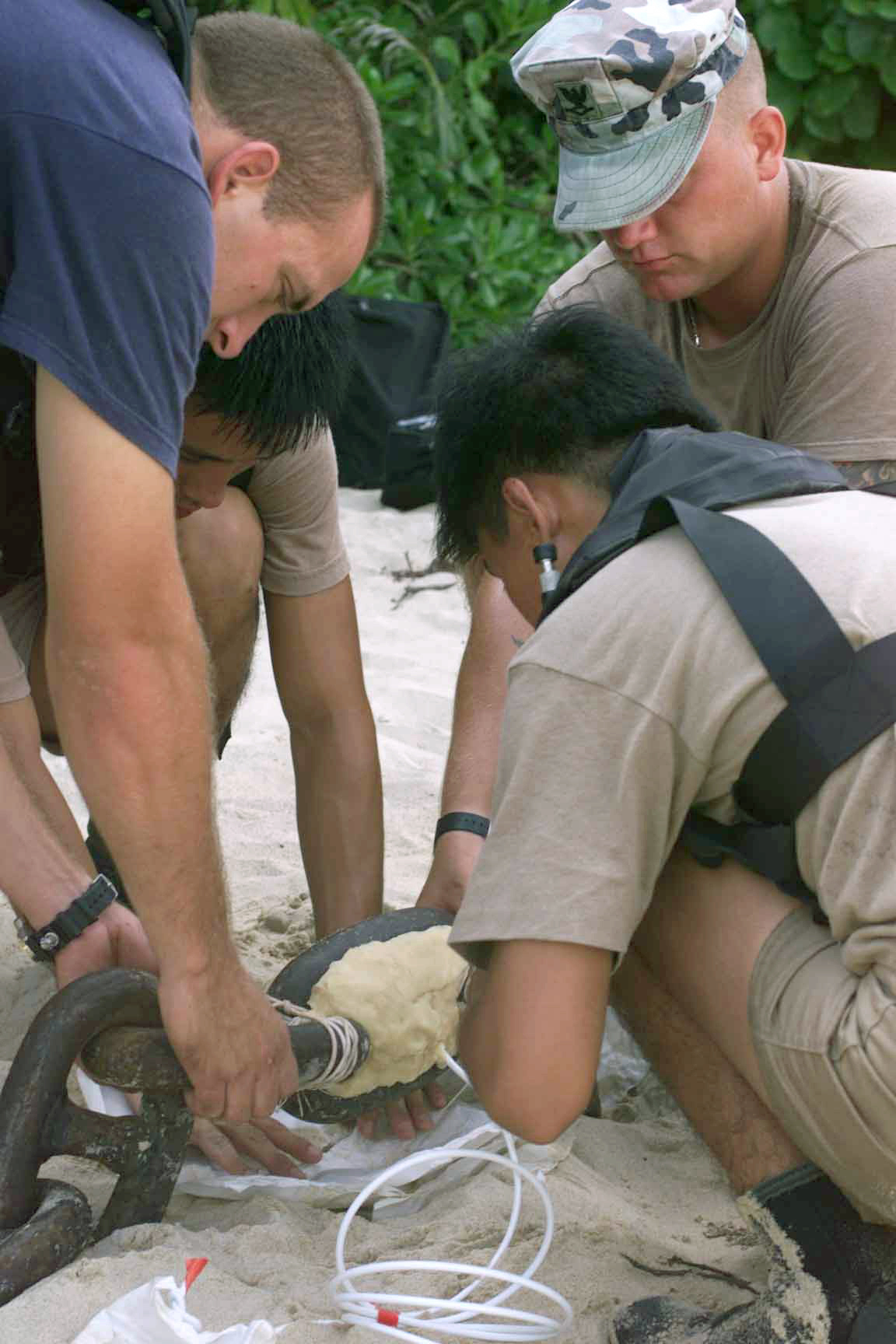
A C-4 charge packed onto a marine anchor chain

Plastic explosives are especially suited for explosive demolition of obstacles and fortifications by combat engineers, as they can be easily formed into ideal shapes for cutting structural members and have a high-enough velocity of detonation and density for metal cutting work.

An early use of plastic explosives was in the warhead of the Petard demolition mortar of the British Armoured Vehicle Royal Engineers (AVRE), which was used to destroy concrete fortifications encountered during Operation Overlord (D-Day). The original use of Nobel 808 supplied by the SOE was for sabotage of German installations and railways in Occupied Europe.

Plastic explosives are generally not used for ordinary blasting, as they tend to be significantly more expensive than other materials that perform just as well. A common commercial use of plastic explosives is for shock-hardening high-manganese steel, a material typically used for train-rail components and earth-digging implements.

Reactive armor in tanks uses plastic explosives sandwiched between two plates of steel. Incoming high-explosive shaped-charge anti-tank rounds pierce the outer steel plate, then detonate the plastic explosive. This disrupts the energy from the incoming round and shields the tank.

== History ==
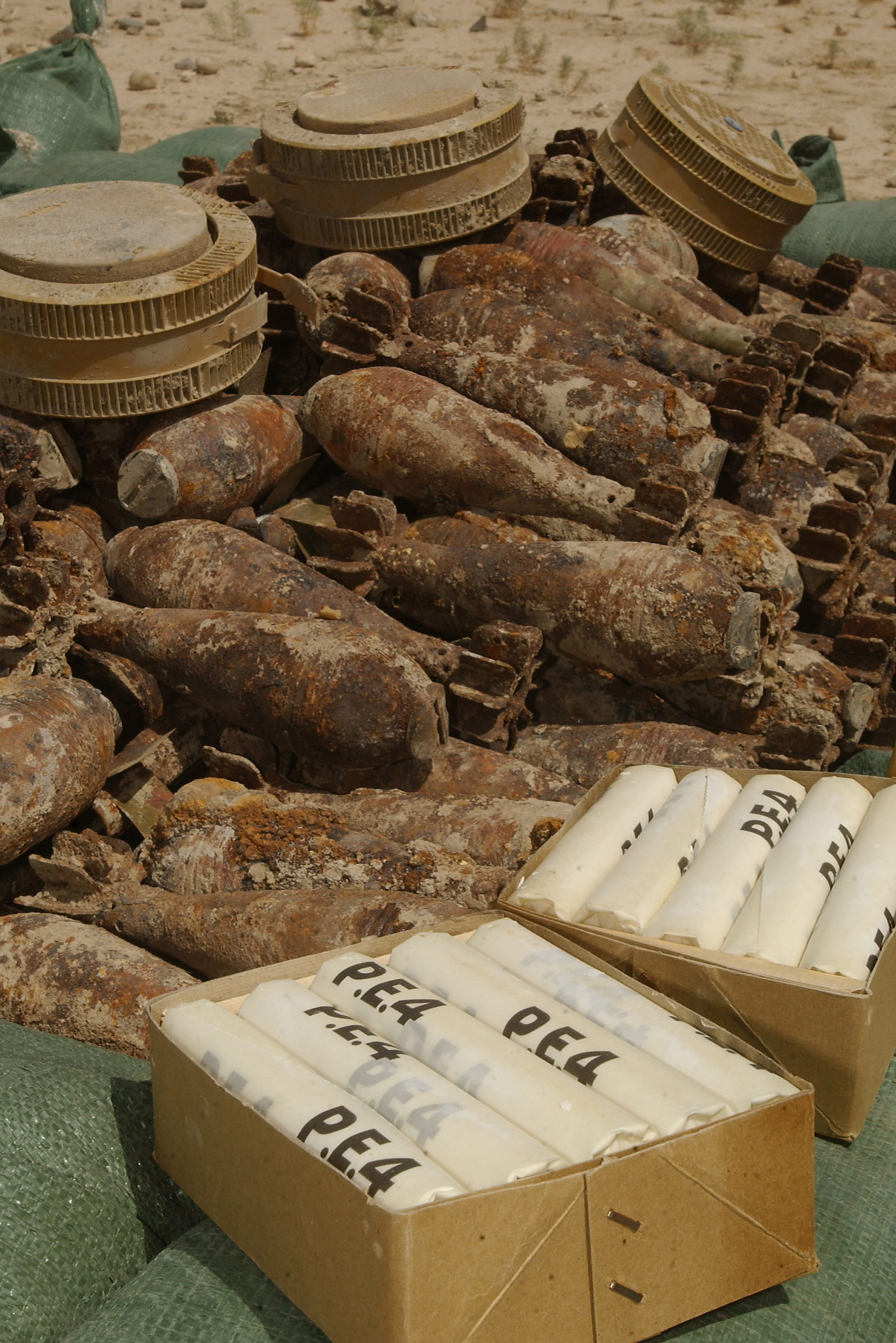
PE4 sticks, used alongside the L3A1 slab version by the British armed forces prior to the adoption of the later L20A1 block/L21A1 slab PE7 and L22A1 slab PE8 explosives

The first plastic explosive was gelignite, invented by Alfred Nobel in 1875. Prior to World War I, the British explosives chemist Oswald Silberrad obtained British and US patents for a series of plastic explosives called "Nitrols", composed of nitrated aromatics, collodion, and oxidising inorganic salts. The language of the patents indicate that at this time, Silberrad saw no need to explain to "those versed in the art" either what he meant by plasticity or why it may be advantageous, as he only explains why his plastic explosive is superior to others of that type.

One of the simplest plastic explosives was Nobel's Explosive No. 808, of the gelignite type, also known as Nobel 808 (often just called Explosive 808 in the British Armed Forces during the Second World War), developed by the British company Nobel Chemicals Ltd well before World War II. It had the appearance of green plasticine with a distinctive smell of almonds. During World War II it was extensively used by the British Special Operations Executive (SOE) at Aston House for sabotage missions. It is also the explosive used in HESH anti-tank shells and was an essential factor in the devising of the Gammon grenade. Captured SOE-supplied Nobel 808 was the explosive used in the failed 20 July plot assassination attempt on Adolf Hitler in 1944.

During and after World War II, a number of new RDX-based explosives were developed, including Compositions C, C2, and eventually C3. Together with RDX, these incorporate various plasticizers to decrease sensitivity and make the composition plastic. The origin of the obsolete term "plastique" dates back to the Nobel 808 explosive introduced to the US by the British in 1940. The samples of explosive brought to the US by the Tizard Mission had already been packaged by the SOE ready for dropping via parachute container to the French Resistance and were therefore labeled in French, as Explosif Plastique. It is still referred to by this name in France and also by some Americans.

== Types ==
=== Composition C ===
The British used a plastic explosive during World War II as a demolition charge. The specific explosive, Composition C, was 88.3% RDX and 11.7% non-oily, non-explosive plasticizer. The material was plastic between 0 and 40 °C (32–104 °F), but was brittle at colder temperatures and gummy at higher temperatures. Composition C was superseded by Composition C2, which used a mixture of 80% RDX and 20% plasticizer. Composition C2 had a wider temperature range at which it remained plastic, from −30 to 52 °C (−22 to 126 °F). Composition C2 was replaced by Composition C3, which was a mixture of 77% RDX and 23% explosive plasticizer. C3 was effective but proved to be too brittle in cold weather and was replaced with C4. There are three classes of C4, with varying amounts of RDX and polyisobutylene.

=== Semtex ===
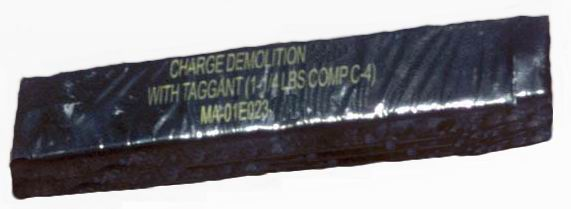
A 1.25-pound (570-gram) demolition charge of C4 explosive

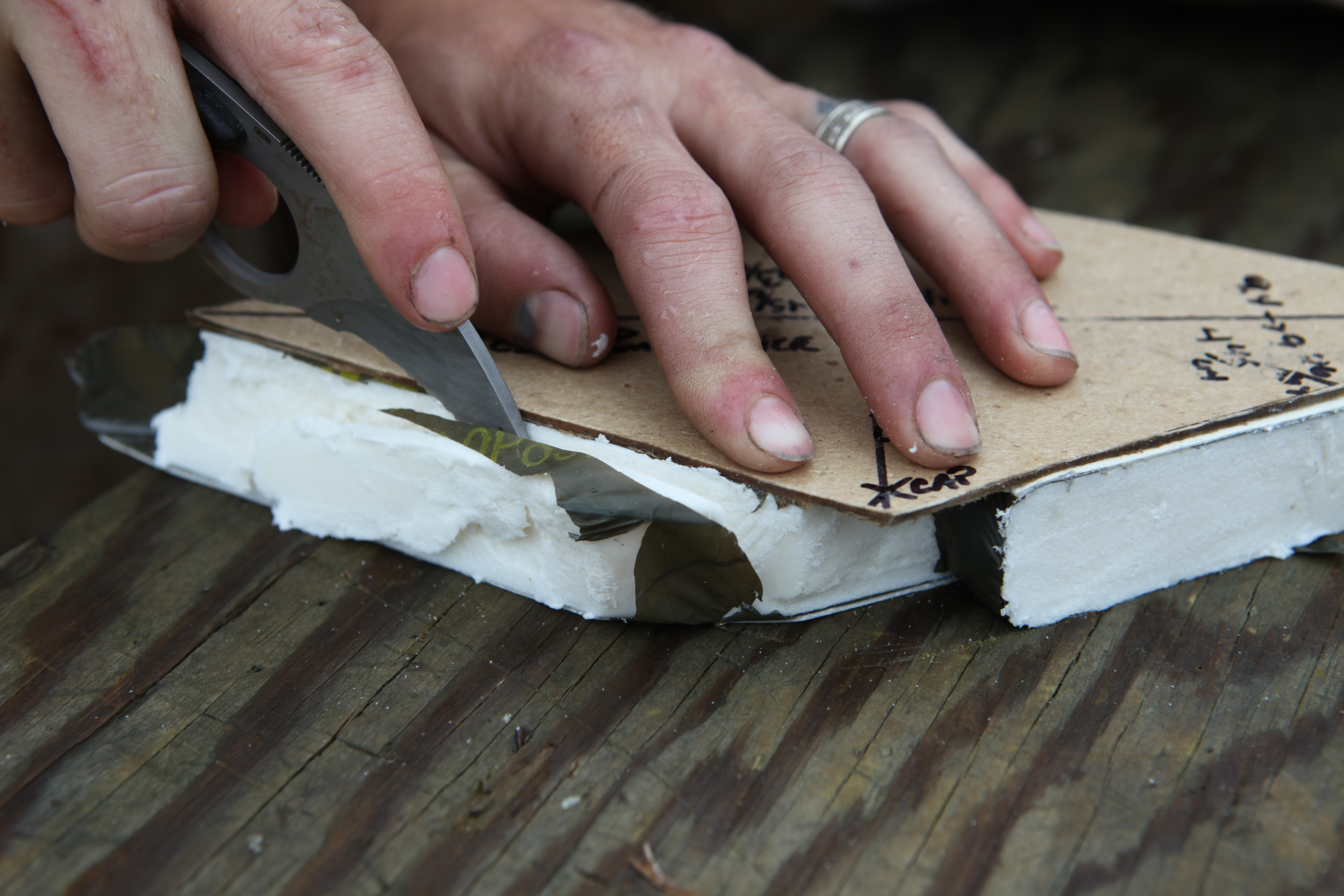
A Marine shapes a charge of C4 to cut through solid steel at a demolitions range

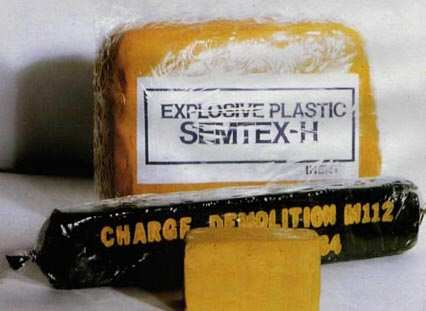
Two blocks of Semtex-1H (note the characteristic orange color) and an American M112 charge containing C4

== List of plastic explosives ==
- Australia: PE4, PE4-MC
- Austria: KNAUERIT SPEZIAL
- Czech Republic: Semtex-1H (orange-colored), Semtex 1A (red-colored), Semtex 10 (also called Pl Np 10; black-colored), Pl Hx 30 (gray-colored)
- Finland: PENO
- France: Hexomax, Composition C-4 PLASTRITE (FORMEX P1, Pla Np 87)
- Germany: Sprengkörper DM12, P8301, Seismoplast 1 (Sprengmasse, formbar)
- Netherlands: Knaverit S1 (light orange-colored)
- Greece: C3, C4
- India: PEK-1
- Israel: Semtex
- Italy: T-4 Plastico
- Norway: NM91 (HMX), C4, DPX10 (PE8)
- Pakistan: PE-3A
- Poland: PMW, NITROLIT
- Russia: PVV-5A Plastic Explosive
- Slovakia: CHEMEX (Composition C-4 equivalent), TVAREX 4A, Pl Hx 30
- South Africa: PE9 (Composition C-4 equivalent)
- Spain: PG2, PG4, GOMA 0, GOMA 1, GOMA 2
- Sweden: Sprängdeg m/46, NSP711 (PETN-based), NSH711 (cyclonite-based)
- Switzerland: PLASTEX produced by SSE
- Turkey: Composition C-4
- United Kingdom
  - MOD (Ministry of Defence) explosives: PE2 (sheet explosive, superseded by SX2), PE3A (superseded by PE4), PE4 (pure to off-white slab, block, or stick, superseded by PE7 and PE8 in MOD usage), SX2 (sheet explosive, superseded by SX4), PE7 (pure to off-white slab or block, Hexomax variant), PE8 (pure to off-white slab or block, current in-service slab charge), SX4 (sheet explosive), DPX (DPX1 used in L26A1 Bangalore Torpedo Demolition Charge, DPX9 used in SABREX and as a key component of SX4)
  - Non-MOD explosives: Composition C-4 (M5A1 and M112 charges produced by Mondial Defence Systems), Semtex (Several variants including Razor produced by Mondial Defence Systems, PW4 variant produced by Chemring))
- United States: Composition C-4 (pure white block or sheet, current in-service charges designated as M112 and M118), PETN and RDX based Sheet Explosive (Primasheet, Durasheet), DURABLOCK Advanced Demolition Explosive(ADX) Produced by Donovan Commercial Industries
- Yugoslavia/Serbia: PP–01 (Composition C-4 equivalent)

== See also ==
- Convention on the Marking of Plastic Explosives
