= Long-range locator =

A long-range locator is a class of fraudulent devices purported to be a type of metal detector, supposedly able to detect a variety of substances, including gold, drugs and explosives; most are said to operate on a principle of resonance with the material being detected.

== Theory of operation ==
Skeptics have examined the internals of many such devices and found those that have been examined to be incapable of operating as advertised, and have dismissed them as overpriced dowsing rods or similarly useless devices. Virtually all such devices claim to operate on a resonant frequency principle where the device is said to emit an electromagnetic signal, either through an antenna or a probe, that will respond to a specific substance such as gold, silver, or sometimes even paper money, and that the device will indicate the presence of such material by indicating a change in direction relative to the operator.

This theory of operation is not supported by scientific theory; the devices have not been shown to work in blind testing, and the resonance principle invoked has not been shown to work in laboratories (and is not consistently employed by LRL manufacturers). In addition, the Inverse-Square Law limits the effective possible signal strength of any putative LRL; moreover, not only does this attenuation apply to the supposed emissions from the LRL devices, but the return signals from the sought-after targets are further attenuated by the same constraints. Since most of these LRL devices are powered by low voltage, low current AA, AAA or 9v cells, the resultant power available for emissions is quite minuscule at best, and the return signal would suffer even greater attenuation. Examples exist of LRL devices having no internal power source at all, and these are advertised as being self-powered or powered by ambient static electricity; these are indistinguishable from dowsing rods.

== Scientific evaluation ==
Many such devices contain non-functional circuitry or naively constructed approximations of radio transmitters. A few do have functional circuitry, putting out a weak signal with a function generator or a simple timer circuit, but are still largely useless in comparison with a coil-based metal detector; others have been found to contain intentionally obfuscated or completely superfluous components (from individual components such as inductors or ribbon cables up to, in some cases, pocket calculators), often indicative of intentional fraud, incompetence, or both, by the designer. Such functioning circuitry as exists in such devices usually has no obvious way (motor, solenoid, etc.) to connect to any rotating joint in the device either, meaning the devices are often entirely dependent on the ideomotor effect to function.

== Media exposure and controversy ==
Author Tom Clancy came under fire for including the DKL Lifeguard, a long-range locator purported to be useful for detecting people, in critical passages of his novel Rainbow Six. A study by Sandia National Laboratories proved the Lifeguard to be completely useless, and other designs by the Lifeguard's creator Thomas Afilani have been shown to contain numerous dummy components with no clear function.

Accusing the manufacturers of fraud, the UK banned export of the GT 200, used by the government of Thailand, and the ADE 651, used by the government of Iraq, in January 2010.

== See also ==
- ADE 651
- Alpha 6 (device)
- GT200
- Quadro Tracker
- Sniffex
- TR Araña
