= Meirion Jones =

Welsh journalist

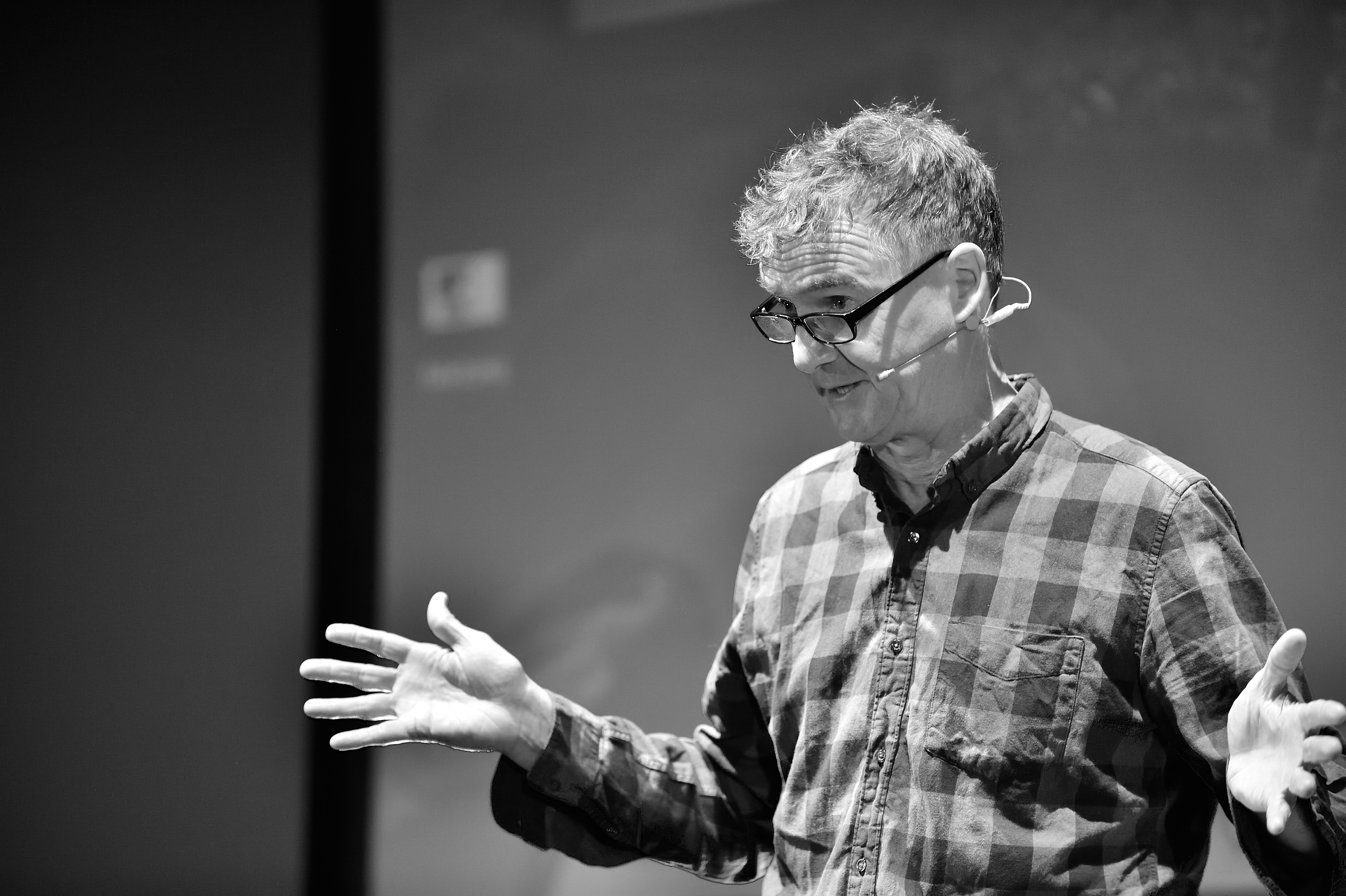
- Jones speaking at QEDcon, Manchester, October 2016
- Born: London, England
- Occupation: Investigative journalist

Meirion Jones is a Welsh journalist. He worked for the BBC from 1988 until 2015 and is now the editor of the Bureau of Investigative Journalism. Former Newsnight presenter Jeremy Paxman described Jones as "a dogged journalist with that obsessional, slightly nutty commitment that marks out all successful investigative reporters".

Jones has investigated many subjects, including the alleged fixing of the US presidential election in 2000, toxic waste dumping in Africa, how Britain helped Israel's nuclear weapons programme, market-rigging by multinationals, bogus bomb detectors, tsunami aid, terror and security, political scandals, and financial scams. He has written for many newspapers including The Guardian.

Jones also worked with journalist Liz MacKean in late 2011 on a Newsnight investigation which aimed to expose recently deceased BBC star Jimmy Savile as a prolific paedophile. Its suppression by their boss, then Newsnight editor Peter Rippon, ultimately led to a major scandal. Jones featured in Netflix's two-part documentary Jimmy Savile: A British Horror Story (2022).

== Early career ==
Jones was the first full-time editor of the Cardiff student paper Gair Rhydd. He once broke into the principal's office to copy and expose files about an Iraqi henchman. He worked for Your Computer magazine, reviewing computers and interviewing the likes of Douglas Adams. He then freelanced at New Scientist, where he wrote about a variety of subjects, from food poisoning to how to phase out the CFCs which were damaging the ozone layer.

== Career ==
Jones joined the BBC in 1988, working on the Today programme and then World at One and PM, before moving to Newsnight in 1996.

Jones and Greg Palast made more than a dozen investigative films on subjects such as oil and the war in Iraq, the Bin Laden family, the Bush family, the 2002 Venezuelan coup attempt against Hugo Chávez, and vulture funds. Jones and Palest also revealed how many black voters in Florida had been barred from voting in the 2000 election by a purge of the Florida Central Voter File.

In 2005–6, Jones made three films with Michael Crick on nuclear weapons of Israel which revealed for the first time how Britain had helped Israel's nuclear weapons programme. Papers obtained through Freedom of Information showed how the UK had secretly exported the heavy water to Israel to start up the Dimona nuclear reactor and had supplied Israel with samples of uranium-235, plutonium and lithium 6. Jones wrote a print version of the revelations which New Statesman ran as their cover story. In September 2016, Jones and Israeli nuclear historian Avner Cohen wrote a piece for Haaretz revealing that there had been an investigation into 1960s British nuclear weapons chief Nyman Levin.

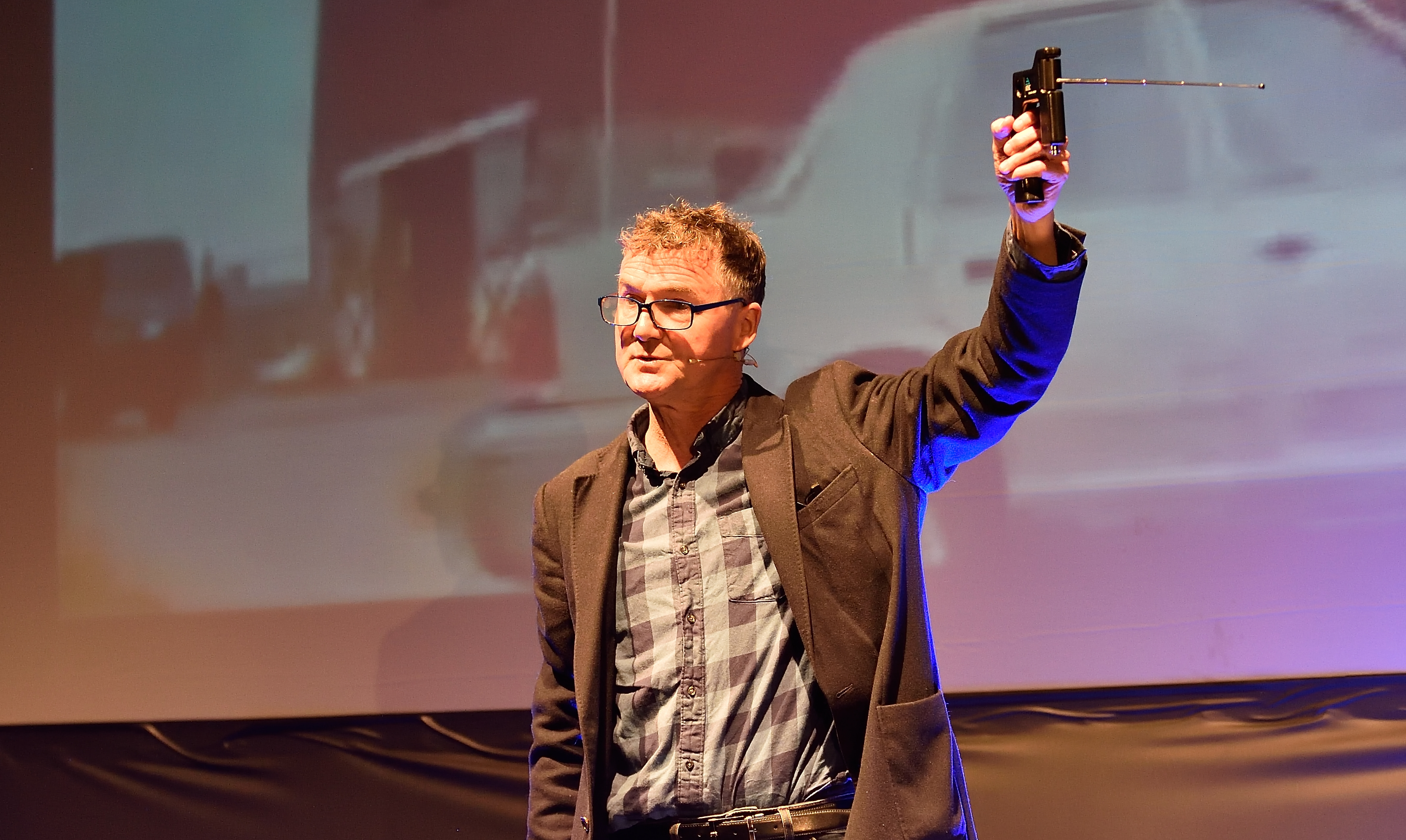
Jones lecturing at QED 2016 about the fake bomb detector ADE 651 that he helped expose.

On 22 January 2010, the British government announced that it would ban the export of "magic wand" type bomb detectors to Iraq and Afghanistan because of the danger to British and allied troops. The ban on the ADE 651, GT200, Alpha 6 and similar products was the result of an investigation by Jones and the BBC's former Baghdad correspondent Caroline Hawley broadcast that day which showed that the detectors did not and could not work. British businessman Jim McCormick sold $85 million of the bogus detectors to Iraq before the ban. The Inspector General of the Iraqi Interior Ministry told the BBC that hundreds of civilians in Baghdad had died as a result of because suicide bombers were able to smuggle explosives past checkpoints equipped with the bogus devices. On 23 April 2013, McCormick, was convicted of three counts of fraud involving the ADE651 at the Old Bailey in London, and was subsequently sentenced to ten years' imprisonment. The owner of the company which made the GT200, Gary Bolton, who sold thousands of the devices in Mexico Thailand and other countries was also convicted on 26 July 2013 on two charges of fraud and subsequently jailed for seven years.

Jones and Palast investigated Vulture fund operations, which attempt to divert into their own pockets the money given by Western governments to pay off the debts of poor countries. These films formed the centerpiece of a campaign backed by Oxfam and the Jubilee Debt Campaign to outlaw this practice through a Debt Relief Bill. The first film in 2007 exposed an American vulture who liked to call himself «Goldfinger» who was suing Zambia. It was rebroadcast in the US and seen by two Congressmen who immediately went to the White House and asked President Bush face-to-face to curb the vulture funds. In 2010 the UK parliament finally voted to outlaw such vulture fund operations by passing the Debt Relief Act.

Beginning in 2009, Jones made a series of films over three years exposing how toxic waste from the oil trader Trafigura came to be illegally dumped in Abidjan in Africa rather than safely disposed of in the Netherlands. According to the government of Ivory Coast 16 people died and thousands were poisoned by the waste. The films were made in the face of pressure from Trafigura's lawyers Carter-Ruck who were attempting to close down press coverage of Trafigura's role in the scandal. Ultimately Carter-Ruck even attempted to use a super-injunction to stop The Guardian reporting mentions of Trafigura in Parliament. In response to the pressure Jones set up a network of international journalists and investigators to share information on the dumping, informally known as "Team Trafigura". In April 2010, the International Consortium of Investigative Journalists gave the Daniel Pearl Award for Outstanding International Investigative Reporting to the members of that team for exposing "how a powerful offshore oil trader tried to cover up the poisoning of 30,000 West Africans".

On 15 October 2010, the multi-national Reckitt Benckiser was fined £10 million for rigging the market for Gaviscon following an investigation by Jones and Martin Shankleman.

Immediately following Jimmy Savile's death in October 2011, Jones and his colleague Liz MacKean began an investigation for Newsnight into rumours of his history of sexual abuse and paedophilia. They interviewed one victim on camera and others agreed to have their stories told anonymously. Jones and MacKean discovered that Surrey Police had investigated allegations of abuse against Savile. The programme was scheduled for broadcast on 7 December 2011, but the film was never shown and the BBC instead broadcast tributes to Savile for its Christmas schedule. The decision to pull the Newsnight investigation eventually led to a major crisis in public trust of the BBC. The later Pollard Review found that Jones and MacKean had found cogent evidence that Savile was an abuser and that the programme could have exposed Savile in 2011, but a flawed decision was made not to broadcast. There was no public mention of the Newsnight investigation into Savile at the time, but in early 2012, several newspapers reported that the BBC had investigated allegations of sexual abuse immediately after Savile's death, but the report was not broadcast. An article by Miles Goslett in The Oldie alleged there had been a cover-up by the BBC. Jones had met Savile a few times as a mid-teen, as his aunt had run Duncroft School for "intelligent but emotionally disturbed girls", which Savile visited. In 2010, Jones became aware of a critical memoir by a former pupil, which instigated his interest in Savile.

In 2014, Jones was the joint producer with Owen Phillips of the Panorama about the ex-News of the World undercover reporter Mazher Mahmood called “Fake Sheikh: Exposed” which starting from the case of Tulisa Contostavlos alleged that many of Mazher Mahmood's investigations had been dishonest. The broadcast was twice delayed and was finally transmitted on 12 November 2014. Following the programme the Crown Prosecution Service announced that they would reinvestigate 25 cases where people were convicted on Mahmood's evidence. Mazher Mahmood was convicted in October 2016 of conspiring to pervert the course of justice in the Tulisa Contostavlos case and sentenced to 15 months in prison.

In July 2016, Jones became investigations editor at the Bureau of Investigative Journalism. In 2021 he became editor of the Bureau.

== Awards ==
- 2013: the London Press Awards Scoop of the Year prize for his part in the investigation into Jimmy Savile
- 2010: Daniel Pearl Award (International Consortium of Investigative Journalists) for his investigation of the dumping of Trafigura's toxic waste in Africa.
