= Bruce Hood =

Bruce Hood may refer to:

- Bruce Hood (ice hockey) (1936–2018), Canadian ice hockey referee
- Bruce Hood (psychologist), British experimental psychologist
