= C-FAST =

Bogus hepatitis C virus detection device

C-FAST was a device purported to be able to detect infection with the hepatitis C virus (HCV) from a distance, using electromagnetic radiation emanating from the virus' genome. At a press conference in February 2014, Egyptian generals presented the device as a result of decades-long secret military research.

== Device ==
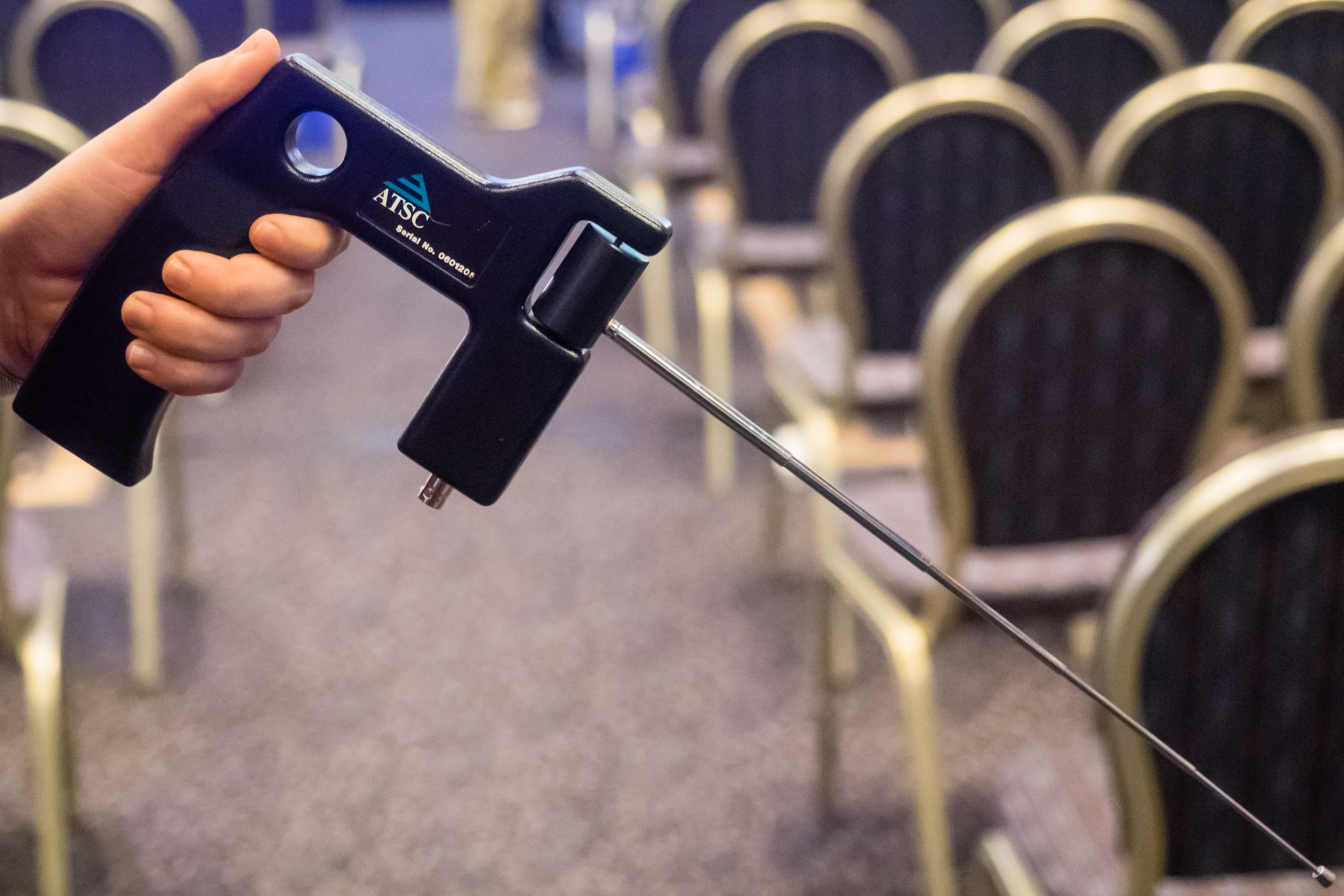
C-FAST's design is very similar to the fake bomb detector ADE 651 shown here

The government of Egypt filed an international patent for the device in 2010. The Guardian wrote about it in February 2013. A report on an international study evaluating C-FAST appeared in 2013 in an online journal published by the predatory publisher WASET. According to this report, the device detected hepatitis C with high specificity and sensitivity. The device was said to compare the received electromagnetic signal from a patient to the ideal signal emitted by a specific part of the HCV RNA genome that had been measured in a laboratory and stored on the device. If those signals agreed, the hand-held device would create a force, pointing the device's antenna towards the patient; if they didn't agree, no force was detected.

The device's design and claimed method of action were very similar to those of the bogus bomb detection device ADE 651, and it resembles a divining rod.

== Press conference ==
At the press conference on 24 February 2014, Egyptian major-general Ibrahim Abdel-Atti revealed the device, as well as a similar one ("I-FAST") for the detection of HIV infection. Both were adapted from a bomb detecting device. Another device was announced at the presentation, the "Complete Cure Device" (CCD), which was said to operate similar to a dialysis machine, curing hepatitis C and HIV by removing the viruses from the blood.

Field Marshal Abdel Fattah Al-Sisi, who had just been appointed Minister of Defense, attended the presentation, which might have had political significance, especially since Egypt has the highest rate of hepatitis C in the world and Al-Sisi was a candidate (and ultimately successful) in the presidential elections three months later.

== Reactions and further developments ==
Egyptian comedian, news commenter and physician Bassem Youssef mocked the devices on air.

The CCD was planned to be rolled out in Egyptian army hospitals in July 2014, but in that month it was announced that this roll-out had to be delayed to allow for further testing. The claims about the devices were strongly criticised by doctors and scientists.
