= Bruce Hood (psychologist) =

Canadian-British psychologist and philosopher

- Bruce Hood giving his Why We Fail to Reason & How to Speak Easily talk at QED 2015
- Born: Toronto, Ontario, Canada
- Citizenship: British/Canadian
- Scientific career
- Workplaces: University of Bristol, University of Cambridge, University of Dundee, Harvard University, Massachusetts Institute of Technology
- Thesis: Development of visual selective attention (1991)
- Website: brucehood.com

Bruce MacFarlane Hood is a Canadian-born British experimental psychologist and philosopher who specialises in developmental cognitive neuroscience. He is currently based at the University of Bristol and his major research interests include intuitive theories, self identity, essentialism and the cognitive processes behind adult magical thinking.

== Biography ==
Hood completed undergraduate studies in psychology, then received a Master of Arts and a Master of Philosophy from the University of Dundee. He received a PhD from University of Cambridge in 1991, studying the visual development of infants. After moving to the US he took a place as a visiting professor at MIT and faculty professor at Harvard University. He is currently a professor at the University of Bristol, where he conducts research at the School of Psychological Science and teaches the Developmental Psychology modules.

== Work ==
=== Cognitive development in childhood ===
In his research, Hood investigates various aspects of cognitive development in children. He is best known for discovering a naïve theory of gravity and looking at the origins of superstitious beliefs in children. Most notably, his research showed that children inherently prefer 'their' individual objects over duplicated ones a behaviour which persists into adulthood. Further, he investigates how children use gaze to infer about the mental states of humans they are interacting with.

=== Science of Happiness ===
Since 2018, Hood has been delivering the Science of Happiness course at University of Bristol as well as other universities and organizations. Modelled after the successful Psychology and the Good Life course initiated by Laurie Santos at Yale University, the programme has been shown to improve mental well-being and is the basis for the BBC podcast The Happiness Half-Hour co-presented by Hood.

=== Public engagement ===
Hood has been engaging in science outreach since the beginning of his career. In 2009, he published his first popular science bookSuperSense: Why We Believe in the Unbelievable. The book tackles how the human brain generates superstitious beliefs. Hood argues that humans evolved to "detect patterns in the world" and defines the supersense as the "inclination to infer that there are hidden forces that create the patterns that we think we detect". Contrary to prominent skeptics such as Richard Dawkins, Hood is convinced that superstitious beliefs are inevitable and even beneficial to humans. For instance, he argues that essentialism is beneficial to social interactions, since it allows humans to overcome objectification and attribute uniqueness to other humans. However, Hood clearly differentiates between secular and religious beliefs, where secular supernatural beliefs are universally applicable across cultures and religious beliefs are culturally specific. He also argues that secular superstitious beliefs do predispose humans to religious beliefs.

In 2012, Hood published his second popular science book The Self Illusion: Why there is no 'you' inside your head (published under the alternative title The Self Illusion: How the social brain creates identity in America). In this book, he argues that the human sense of self is a construct of the brain which facilitates experiencing and interacting with the world. "Who we are," Hood writes, "is a story of our self − a constructed narrative that our brain creates". Bruce uses a "a distinction that William James drew between the self as "I" and "me". Our consciousness of the self in the here and now is the "I" and most of the time, we experience this as being an integrated and coherent individual – a bit like the character in the story. The self which we tell others about, is autobiographical or the "me" which again is a coherent account of who we think we are based on past experiences, current events and aspirations for the future".

In October 2012, Hood devised the world's largest simultaneous memory experiment for the Society of Biology involving 2000 participants to demonstrate the phenomenon of false memories. This was officially recognised by the Guinness Book of Records in 2013.

Hood's third popular science book, The Domesticated Brain, was published in 2014 and explores the neuro-cognitive origins and consequences of social behaviour in humans. The book's thesis is that "over the most recent evolution, the last 20,000 years", humans have been "selecting each other for prosocial behaviour and that has changed our brains and the way we've become more codependent". He presented this topic at The Royal Society of Arts, The Royal Society and the 2014 Cheltenham Science Festival.

In 2019 Hood published Possessed: Why Do We Want More Than We Need? This book addresses the psychological mechanisms behind over-consumption and the link between materialism and self-identity building on the ideas of William James and Russell Belk's 'extended self-concept'. His most recent book The Science of Happiness (2024) has been published in 26 countries.

In addition to books, Hood has appeared in numerous popular science podcasts, radio shows, TV series and documentary movies. In 2011, Hood was chosen to present the prestigious Royal Institution Christmas Lectures entitled Meet Your Brain The lectures were first broadcast on BBC4 and again on BBC2 in 2012. Hood also appeared in the award-winning eco-documentary movie Living in the Futures' Past co-produced and presented by academy award winner Jeff Bridges.

=== Skepticism ===
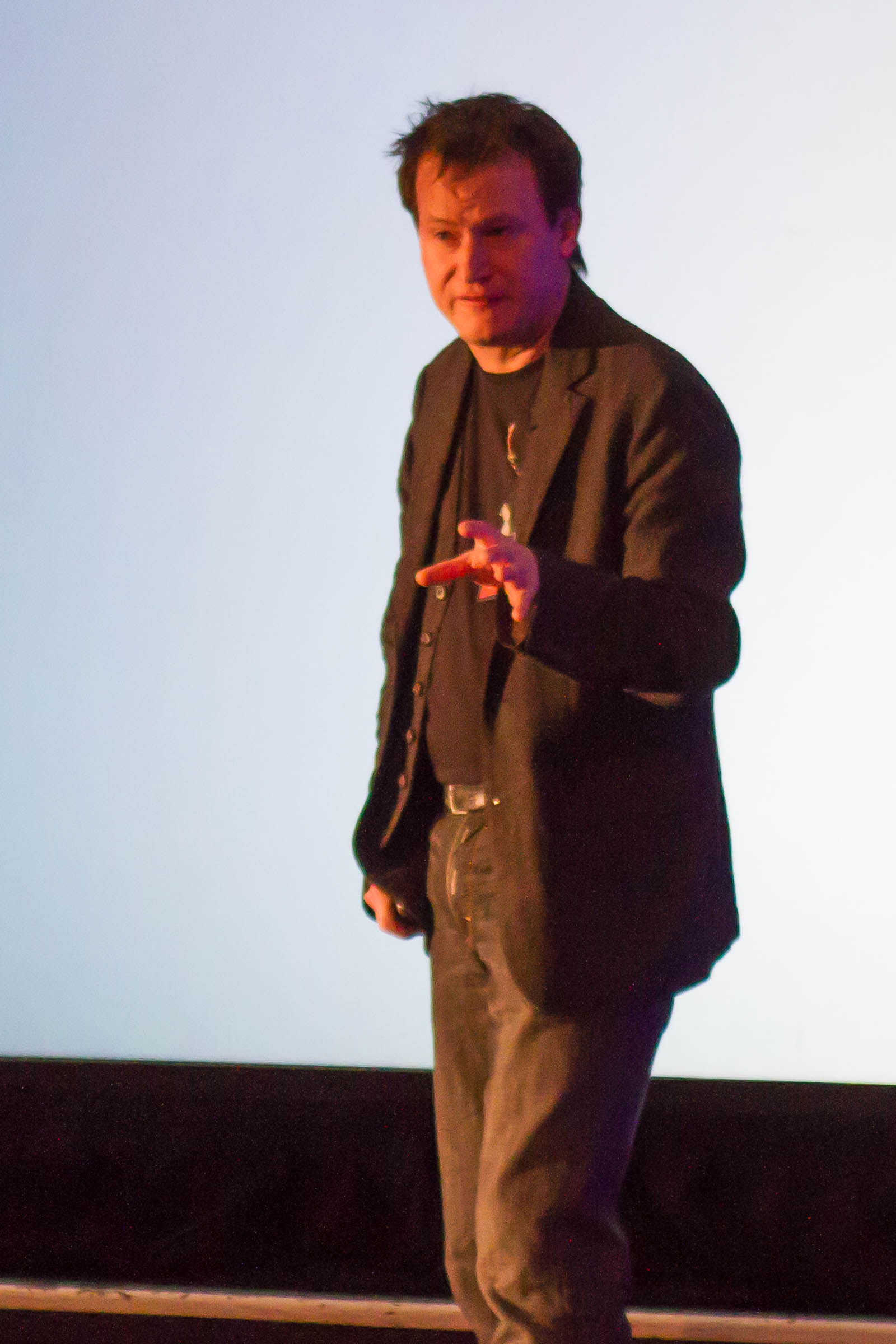
Professor Bruce Hood at the QED conference in Manchester 2011

Hood played a key part in exposing the ADE 651 bogus bomb detector and similar devices in January 2010. He got involved in exposing the scam upon realising that the devices were produced locally in Somerset (UK) and challenged the creator of the devices, Jim McCormick, to demonstrate their validity. Even though McCormick initially agreed to this, the demonstration was then delayed and McCormick later required Hood to sign a non-disclosure statement concerning their meeting. Hood had also contacted the BBC about McCormick and his fraudulent products, which ultimately resulted in the production of a BBC Newsnight documentary about ADE 651 and a related device, the GT200. In this documentary, Hood demonstrates that the perceived effect of the devices can be explained by the ideomotor phenomenon, which had fooled naive users.

My-Thesis.Org

In March 2026, Hood launched My-Thesis.Org, a global platform where graduate students present their research in short, accessible videos. Many of these are in the Three Minute Thesis (3MT) format, a competition that originated out of the University of Queensland. According to Hood, the purpose of the platform is to create a searchable database of research talks to counter the proliferation of AI generated experts, ensuring each presenter is verified through their university or recognized institution.The platform has recently partnered with the Canadian Association for Graduate Studies (CAGS) which represent over 60 higher education institutions.

== Awards and recognition ==
He was awarded a Sloan Fellowship in neuroscience in 1997, a Young Investigator Award from the International Society for Infant Studies and the Robert L. Fantz prize in 1999. He is the only individual to win the University of Bristol Engagement Award twice (2008–2012) and in 2013, Hood received The British Psychological Society Public Engagement and Media award. From 2014 to 2016, Hood was President of the Psychology Section of the British Science Association and in 2016, he received the inaugural Distinguished Contribution to Developmental Psychology award from the British Psychological Society. In 2019, he received an honorary Doctor of Science from Abertay University and is honorary life-time fellow of the Association Psychological Science and The Royal Institution of Great Britain. In 2025, Hood was awarded a National Teaching Fellowship in recognition of his contribution to higher education.

== Publications ==
=== Books ===
- Bruce Hood: The Science of Happiness: Seven Lessons for Living Well (2024), Simon & Schuster. ISBN 978-1398526372
- Bruce Hood: Possessed: Why We Want More Than We Need (2019), Oxford University Press. ISBN 978-0190699918
- Bruce Hood: The Domesticated Brain (2014), Pelican Books. ISBN 978-0141974866 OCLC 1084362158
- Bruce Hood: The Self Illusion: Why there is no 'you' inside your head (2012), Constable & Robinson. ISBN 978-1780330075
- Daniel Schacter, Daniel Gilbert, Daniel Wegner, Bruce Hood: Psychology (2011), Palgrave Macmillan. ISBN 978-0230579835
- Bruce Hood: SuperSense: Why We Believe in the Unbelievable (2009), Constable & Robinson. ISBN 978-1849010306

=== Key publications ===
- Hood, BM; Bloom, P (2008). "Children prefer certain individuals over perfect duplicates". Cognition. 106 (1): 455–62. doi:10.1016/j.cognition.2007.01.012. PMID 17335793. S2CID 7515552.

=== Popular science articles ===
- Bruce Hood on The Huffington Post
- Bruce Hood on Scientific American
