= Caroline Hawley =

British journalist (born 1967)

Caroline Hawley (born 1967 in Nigeria) is a British journalist who has been a special correspondent for the BBC News channel since 2007.

== Early life ==
Hawley is a daughter of British diplomat Sir Donald Hawley. She was educated at Wycombe Abbey, an independent school for girls in High Wycombe in Buckinghamshire, followed by Pembroke College, Oxford where she studied Arabic and Persian.

== Career ==
Hawley began her career in journalism on Newsweek as the magazine's Jerusalem correspondent from 1991 to 1994. She joined the BBC in 1994 working for the World Service as a newsroom journalist, before being posted to Cairo in 1999 and Jordan around 2001.

While the BBC's Baghdad correspondent, she was expelled from Iraq in 2002, but returned to the country after Saddam Hussein was removed from power the following year. She was appointed the BBC Middle East correspondent at the beginning of 2006. Hawley and her partner were dining in the Grand Hyatt in Amman, Jordan, when it was bombed in November 2005 by Al-Qaeda; they were unhurt. Hawley was based in Jerusalem from the beginning of 2006.

Hawley has reported on stories for the BBC's Newsnight programme including an investigation into the sale of fake bomb detectors such as the ADE 651 and GT200 to Iraq and other countries. Hawley's investigation led to a ban on UK exports of fake bomb detectors to Iraq and Afghanistan. On 23 April 2013, Jim McCormick, the founder of the company which made the ADE 651, was convicted of three counts of fraud at the Old Bailey in London, and was subsequently sentenced to ten years' imprisonment. The owner of the company which made the GT200, Gary Bolton, was also convicted on 26 July 2013 on two charges of fraud and subsequently jailed for seven years.

In 2026, she sat in for John Simpson on Unspun World.
