= Mostaan 110 =

Iranian counterfeit device designed by the Basij militia

Mostaan 110 or Musta'an 110 (Persian: مستعان ۱۱۰) is an Iranian counterfeit device designed by the Basij militia. The device was unveiled in April 2020 by the Islamic Revolutionary Guard Corps (IRGC), who claimed it was capable of remotely detecting COVID-19. These claims were met with wide skepticism from experts both inside Iran and internationally, and the device's capabilities have not been independently proven.

== Description ==
Mostaan 110 is a series of smaller devices, though the main device appears to be a wired handheld device slightly resembling a power drill, featuring a long forward-facing metal antenna mounted to the top. According to the IRGC, the device detects COVID-19 using electromagnetic radiation emitted by the antenna. The device is connected to a handheld dish-like device, apparently used to scan people.

== Claims ==
The IRGC claimed that the device can be used to detect moments of the coronavirus within a 100 m (330 ft) radius using electromagnetic radiation, with an accuracy rate of 80%.

IRGC Commander-in-Chief Hossein Salami stated that the device could be used for mass screening of people and scanning contaminated areas, claiming that its ability to specify which area is contaminated could minimize the amount of disinfectants being used in areas that are not contaminated. Salami hailed it as an "amazing invention" by Basiji scientists and a remarkable achievement for the IRGC.

Salami claimed that "dozens of countries" had contacted Iran about the device, but clarified that Iran would not share its technology with the United States until American sanctions against Iran were lifted.

== Reception ==
Mostaan 110's unveiling and the IRGC's claims were met with widespread criticism from both Iranian and international experts, who described it as pseudoscientific.

The Physical Society of Iran called the IRGC's description of the device "an unbelievable claim, as far as science fiction is concerned," and called it a pseudoscientific claim. According to the statement, the Human Knowledge Association is currently unable to detect 100-nanometer particles remotely. The Ministry of Health and Medical Education quickly issued a statement following the unveiling, clarifying that the ministry had not issued a license for the device.

Some commentators noted the device's strong resemblance and similarity to the ADE 651, a British device that was marketed as an effective explosive detection tool, but was actually a dowsing rod with no scanning capabilities whatsoever.

Mostaan 110's unveiling was met with mockery and criticism by Iranians on social media. Many Iranians expressed doubt about the veracity of the IRGC's claims, and some teased officials by asking them why the device, which the IRGC praised as a "breakthrough", was not being mass-produced to deal with the COVID-19 pandemic.

Responding to negative reactions to Mostaan 110, IRGC spokesman Ramezan Sharif defended the IRGC's claims, saying the device had been tested for at least 10 days in at least 10 hospitals and treatment centers for coronary patients in the country more than 10 days before its official unveiling.
