= National Anti-Corruption Commission (Thailand) =

Constitutional organization of Thailand

- คณะกรรมการป้องกันและปราบปรามการทุจริตแห่งชาติ

Agency overview
- Formed: April 1999
- Preceding agencies: OCCC; NCCC
- Type: Constitutional organization
- Jurisdiction: Kingdom of Thailand
- Headquarters: Tha Sai Subdistrict, Mueang Nonthaburi, Nonthaburi
- Annual budget: 2,239 million baht (FY2019)
- Agency executives: Pol Gen Watcharapol Prasarnrajkit, President (2020); Niwatchai Kasemmongkol, Secretary-General (2024)
- Website: Official website

The National Anti-Corruption Commission (Abrv: NACC; Thai: คณะกรรมการป้องกันและปราบปรามการทุจริตแห่งชาติ, RTGS: khana kammakan pong kan lae prap pram kan thutcharit haeng chat) is a constitutional organization of Thailand. It is sometimes confused with the Anti-Corruption Organization of Thailand (ACT), a private foundation.

== History ==
The Constitution of the Kingdom of Thailand B.E. 2517 (1974) Section 66 stated "The State should organize government service works and other works efficiently and should take all steps to prevent and suppress the quest for benefits by corruption means." The Counter Corruption Act was promulgated in 1975 and allowed the establishment of Office of the Commission of Counter Corruption (OCCC), but OCCC was granted little power to combat corruption.

The Constitution of the Kingdom of Thailand B.E. 2540 (1997) added checks and balances to assure integrity and transparency in government. New independent government agencies like the National Counter Corruption Commission, the Constitutional Court, the Administrative Court, the Office of the Auditor-General, the National Human Rights Commission, the Consumer Protection Organization, the Environmental Conservation Organization, and an Ombudsman were established.

In 1999, the Organic Act on Counter Corruption B.E. 2542 (1999) was enacted. It created the National Counter Corruption Commission (NCCC) as an independent commission in April.

The Constitution of the Kingdom of Thailand B.E. 2550 (2007) specified (in Chapter XI, Organs under the Constitution; Part 1, Independent Organs under the Constitution; Section 246), that the NCCC consists of a president and eight other members appointed by the king with the advice of the senate. Section 251 stated that the NCCC shall have an independent secretariat, the Secretary–General of the National Counter Corruption Commission as the superior responsible directly to the President of the NCCC.

In 2008, the NCCC's name was changed to National Anti-Corruption Commission (NACC).

== Organization ==
The NACC is presided over by the president of the NACC commission. As of February 2017 the president of the NACC commission is Police General Watcharapol Prasarnrajkit, a political appointee. An NCAA secretary-general, Warawit Sukboon, in the Office of the National Anti-Corruption Commission (ONACC), reports to the president. The NACC commission is occupied by a group of eight NACC commissioners and the president. Branches of the NACC include the operations branch, administrative branch, technical branch, and an administrative support unit attached to the ONACC.

The NACC's FY2019 budget is 2,239 million baht.

== Powers and duties ==
In brief, the NACC is charged with combating corruption by high-ranking government officials and politicians. A similar organization, the Office of Public Sector Anti-Corruption Commission (PACC) under the Ministry of Justice focuses on corruption by low-level governmental officials.

In accordance with the Constitution of the Kingdom of Thailand B.E. 2550, NACC shall have the following powers and duties:

1. to inquire into the facts, summarize the case, and prepare a verdict to be submitted to the Senate according to Section 272 and Section 279 para three
2. to inquire into the facts, summarize the case, and prepare a verdict to be submitted to the Supreme Court of Justice’s Criminal Division for Persons Holding Political Positions in accordance with Section 275
3. to investigate and decide whether a state official who holds an executive post or a Government official who holds a position from the Director level upwards or the equivalent has become unusually wealthy or has committed an offence of corruption, malfeasance in office or malfeasance in judicial office, including any state official or Government official at lower level who has colluded with the said state official or Government official to commit a wrongful offence or other offences that the National Counter Corruption Commission deems appropriate to investigate and decide the case in accordance with the Organic Act pertaining to the National Counter Corruption Commission.
4. to inspect the accuracy, actual existence, as well as change of assets and liabilities of persons holding positions under Section 259 and Section 264 as stated in the account and supporting documents submitted. Political office-holders as well as high-ranking officials must report their assets before assuming their posts and after they leave the posts. They are not required to declare assets while in office. NACC financial disclosure rules do not apply to National Council for Peace and Order (NCPO) members. Also exempt are members of the NCPO-appointed 200-member National Reform Steering Assembly.
5. to supervise and observe the ethics of persons holding political positions
6. to submit an inspection report and a report on the performance of duties together with remarks to the Council of Ministers, the House of Representatives, and the Senate annually and to publish that report in the Government Gazette and disseminate it to the public
7. to carry out other actions as provided by the law

== Operations ==
As of February 2017 since its inception in 1999, the NACC has accepted 3,383 cases for investigation. Of those, investigators found evidence of corruption or malfeasance in about a third, 1,191 cases. Of the thousands of cases processed by the committee, only 105 led to convictions not overturned on appeal. The majority of convictions have not involved rich or powerful defendants. All but one involve infractions by mid- or low-level administrators such as mayors, school directors, policemen, clerks, and registrars.

The NACC has 2,192 "ongoing" cases. Some date back to 1999, the year of the agency's founding. One such case involves an allegation of fraud against a schoolteacher in Chiang Mai. She learned of the allegation in February 2017. The teacher, Jiamjit Boonyarak, is accused of embezzling students' dorm fees and stealing from other projects in 1998. An investigation was not launched until July 2011. On 9 February 2017, the NACC formally informed Jiamjit of the allegations for the first time so she could prepare her defense.

One reason for the NACC's poor conviction rate may be that NACC employees are harassed and threatened in the performance of their duties, necessitating the use of bullet-proof vehicles by NACC staff.

Many of the NACC's efforts are aimed at public awareness activities such as public service videos.

The Bangkok Post has pointed out that the NACC is responsible for "...keep[ing] the Election Commission of Thailand (EC) in check...." It claims that the EC is thought by many to be politically biased, but that the NACC itself lacks credibility and has made no progress in its handling of public complaints about the EC's seeming political favouritism.

== Notable cases ==
Not all cases are equal in the eyes of the NACC, according to Srisuwan Janya, a government transparency activist, and Somchai Preechasilpakul, a law lecturer at Chiang Mai University. They maintain that the NACC shows selective enthusiasm by expediting cases against the political opposition while ignoring those brought against those in power.

=== GT200 bomb detector ===
As of 2018, fourteen years after the Thai military and police spent millions on fraudulent GT200 "bomb detectors", the NACC investigation is still "on-going". Surasak Keereevichien, an NACC member, stated in August 2018 that it is difficult for the anti-graft agency to ascertain whether there was any wrongdoing committed in the 1.13 billion baht purchase of fake "remote substance detectors". He said the NACC would come up with a decision on the matter "at an appropriate time. The NACC will not allow the statute of limitations to expire...." Surasak claimed that officials bought the devices despite their exorbitant price tag because they thought they would work. "Sometimes, it is not about the value of devices. It's more about belief, just like when you buy Buddha amulets," Surasak said. "Officials who used this device found it worth the price. But some people see the price as too high." When the GT200 scandal first came to light, the equipment was tested by the National Science and Technology Development Agency (NSTDA) and it found that the GT200 consisted of two pieces of plastic and lacked any electronic components, as was advertised in a brochure distributed to potential customers.

According to the Bangkok Post, "Because it was so thoroughly and risibly cheated, the army has never fully accounted for the GT200's cost, in baht and in human lives. Rough estimates put the economic cost at around 500 million baht." A related case—that of the Alpha 6 drugs detector—was declared "closed" in May 2018 after 10 years of investigation. Three minor officials are deemed responsible for the purchase of 493 of the "worthless [Alpha 6] boxes" at a cost of 350M baht. The British scammer who sold the devices to Thailand was found guilty of fraud in the UK and imprisoned in 2013. The Bangkok Post fumed that, "The disappointing and unsatisfactory outcome of this astoundingly long investigation shows up the enormous failings of the anti-graft commission." As one columnist summed up the investigation, "And you'll never guess how many government ministers and army chiefs (currently in government) the NACC found responsible. Whoa! Yes, 'zero' is correct. How did you know?"

=== Rolls-Royce bribes ===
Aircraft engine-maker Rolls-Royce has admitted to British authorities it paid bribes three times in Thailand over the course of 15 years: US$18.8M from June 1991 to June 1992, US$10.38M from March 1992 to March 1997 and US$7.2M from April 2004 to February 2005. Altogether the payouts amounted to just over one billion baht. The NACC, investigating the case, has been accused of mishandling it, with no bribe-takers identified nearly two weeks after the British firm's 17 January 2017 admission to a UK court that it had bribed Thai Airways and Thai government officials to win engine orders. In 2018 Rolls-Royce and Thai Airways signed a deal making Thai a Rolls-Royce maintenance hub. The Bangkok Post reported, "The press release announcing the new tie-up made no mention of the scandal revealed two years ago showing that Thai government officials had received Rolls-Royce bribes to buy the firm's engines. Thai and Rolls-Royce executives ignored the connection. The government has taken no action and the National Anti-Corruption Commission (NACC) has been silent on the revelation."

In a separate but related action against Rolls-Royce, the US Department of Justice (DOJ) claimed that Rolls-Royce had paid more than US$11M in commissions, aware that some of the funds would be used to bribe officials at Thai energy company PTT and its subsidiary PTT Exploration and Production (PTTEP). The payments were made from 2003-2013 and related to contracts for equipment and after-market products and services. Admitting its guilt, Rolls-Royce paid US$170M to settle the case. PTT vowed to investigate. Subsequently, PTT Chairman and CEO Tevin Vongvanich said that the company was unable to find anyone who "allegedly took bribes". The Bangkok Post has characterised NCAA's actions in the Rolls-Royce case "timorous and ineffective".

As of May 2020, the NACC is still investigating the case.

=== Prawit's watches ===
In December 2017 the NACC opened an investigation into Prawit Wongsuwan's asset disclosures. Prawit is a Deputy Prime Minister of Thailand and Minister of Defence. The NACC gave Prawit until 8 January 2018 to clarify why some Prawit assets, such as 18 luxury watches, were not listed on his mandatory asset declarations when he took office after the 2014 coup d'etat. As more watch disclosures became public, the NACC extended Prawit's deadline to 19 January. On 29 December, Worawit Sukboon, secretary general of the NACC said, "We will investigate this case. It won't take a long time because it's not complicated." By law, political office-holders as well as high-ranking officials must report their assets before assuming their posts and after they leave the posts. They are not required to declare assets while in office. He is said to have filed asset declarations on 22 December 2008 when he became defence minister under Abhisit Vejjajiva; on 10 August 2011 when stepping down from that role; on 9 August 2012, one year after stepping down from his previous role; and on 4 September 2014 when he became deputy prime minister and defence minister. The Bangkok Post estimates the value of Prawit's 16 known timepieces at "...up to 22M[illion baht]" (US$685,000). Critics have questioned why the NACC appears to be giving Prawit special treatment and ignoring its standard operating procedures in his case. They have pointed out that Pol Gen Watcharapol Prasarnrajkit, the incumbent NACC president, is a former Prawit subordinate and a political appointee of the ruling junta. On 9 January 2018, Watcharapol announced he had taken personal charge of the Prawit watch investigation. He promised a "...'professional, transparent' [inquiry], although it will take some time." NACC secretary-general Worawit Sukboon asked the media not to ask about the matter again until "early next month" (February 2018). The Bangkok Post described NACC's handling of the case like this: "On Friday...the NACC announced its version of action. It intends in a couple of weeks, possibly, to consider steps that will lead to starting to get ready to prepare to study an entirely objective fact-finding into how a self-sacrificing minister of defence can live so frugally off a monthly salary that he can pick among Milles (3), Rolexes (7), Patek Philippes (4), Piguets (2)...every morning before setting off to work." As of July 2018, the NACC had still not concluded its eight month-long investigation, citing the "refusal" of Thai watch retailers to provide information on timepiece serial numbers. The NACC now has to seek ownership information from watch manufacturers. "This will take time..." said the NACC.

In August 2018, eight months after Gen Prawit's watches became an issue, Prime Minister Prayut Chan-o-cha removed Prawit from the NCPO's National Anti-Corruption Committee. The committee has not met for over a year, but the optics of a powerful figure who is the subject of an NACC investigation on the committee invited derision.

On 26 December 2018, the NACC unanimously cleared Prawit of any wrongdoing. On 3 January 2019, the NACC was asked in a letter from an opposition politician to explain why it did not find Prawit guilty of failing to declare 22 borrowed watches. The NACC did not reply until 25 May 2020, after 17 months had passed. The NACC then acknowledged that the owner of the watches lent them to Prawit. It also confirmed that Gen Prawit had returned the watches after he used them. The NACC said that this was a case of "loan for use", and, as such, was not required to be declared. The ruling was greeted with dismay by some civil groups.

=== Miscellaneous ===
- In 2006, the former governor of the Tourism Authority of Thailand (TAT), Juthamas Siriwan, was accused by the US Department of Justice of taking an estimated 60M baht bribe from a US couple in exchange for contracts to run the Bangkok International Film Festival Juthamas directed from 2003 to 2006. US authorities arrested the US couple in 2007. The US pair were convicted and sentenced to six months in prison three years later in 2010. In 2015, the NACC had finally completed its casework and the Office of the Attorney-General indicted Juthamas and her daughter. In March 2017, Juthhamas was sentenced to 50 years in prison for demanding and receiving a bribe. Her daughter, Jittisopha, was sentenced to 44 years in jail on the same charge. The court also ordered the confiscation of 62M baht from them.
- Preecha Chan-o-cha, brother of Prime Minister Prayut Chan-o-cha, appointed his son to a military officer's post in September 2016. A filed complaint charged nepotism. Prayut declared there was nothing wrong with the appointment, and the NACC dropped the case a month the complaint was filed. Since 2014 and the military takeover, activists have accused the regime of nepotism and misconduct. The NACC has dismissed all the cases citing lack of evidence. Cases dismissed by the NACC include allegations that the billion baht Rajabhakti Park complex was fouled by corruption and inexplicable expenses.
- The NACC's most visible recent investigation stems from a 2013 corruption complaint against former Prime Minister Yingluck Shinawatra over her government's bankrupt rice subsidy program. Within months the commission announced it had enough evidence to try Yingluck for failing to stop widespread corruption in the program. Her trial is on-going.
- In 2011, London-based liquor conglomerate Diageo PLC, agreed to pay the US Securities and Exchange Commission more than US$16M (561M baht) to settle Foreign Corrupt Practices Act offences involving bribes to foreign officials in Thailand and two other countries between 2003 and 2009. In Thailand, Diageo paid US$12,000 per month from 2004-2008 to a Thai government and political party official for "consulting" services which helped it win favourable decisions from the Thai government. Since 2011, according to former NACC commissioner, Medhi Krongkaew, NACC's probe into the Thai governmental malfeasance has "barely progressed".
- When the NACC revealed the asset declarations of new NLA members, it was disclosed that Bangkok police chief Police Lieutenant General Sanit Mahathavorn has received monthly payments of 50,000 baht since 2015 from alcohol conglomerate Thai Beverage PLC (ThaiBev) as an adviser to the firm. Sanit also serves as a member of the city's alcohol control committee, raising conflict of interest issues. Calls for him to step down from his police post were immediate. In January 2017 a Royal Thai Police investigation confirmed that Sanit is not violating police rules by holding an advisory role with a major alcohol conglomerate. On 1 March 2017, more than two months after the original allegations were made, both Sanit and ThaiBev denied that he was ever employed by ThaiBev and that the report was due to clerical error. Just two weeks after Sanit's denial that he was on ThaiBev's payroll, Thailand's Office of the Ombudsman said that it had obtained his original financial disclosure document certified with his signature. It now appears that there were two versions of Sanit's financial disclosure form, one listing ThaiBev payments and one with no mention of ThaiBev. Unexplained is how the ThaiBev salary did not appear on the version of Sanit's financial disclosure statement posted online by the NACC. In mid-March the Office of the Ombudsman, which had accepted a petition to investigate the case, announced that there is not enough evidence for it to consider and the matter is closed.
- Tarit Pengdith, former director-general of the Department of Special Investigation until his dismissal in 2014, was accused by the NACC of hiding assets while serving as DSI director-general. The NACC found that Tarit had amassed unexplained wealth of 346.65M baht during his 12 years at DSI. The supreme court found Tarit guilty and sentenced him to six months in jail and a fine of 10,000 baht, commuted to a three-month term and a fine of 5,000 baht because he confessed. It suspended the jail term for two years because he had not previously been sentenced to prison.
- In August 2018, the NACC announced that it was close to concluding its investigation into alleged misconduct in the construction of 163 police apartments and 396 police stations nationwide. Seventeen suspects have been implicated. The investigation was initiated in 2009.
- In August 2019, the NACC recommended the indictment of its own deputy secretary-general, Prayat Puangjumpa, for being unusually rich. Prayat was found to have amassed about 227M baht and concealing the assets by omitting them from his mandatory asset affidavit. The undeclared assets were found to have been held by Prayat's wife.

=== 2025 ===
On 24 June 2025, The NACC has opened a preliminary investigation into Prime Minister Paetongtarn Shinawatra. The investigation concerns alleged serious violations of the code of ethics stemming from a controversial conversation with Cambodian Senate President Hun Sen regarding the Thai-Cambodian border dispute.

== Criticism ==
The core mandates of the commission are to root out corruption by investigating unusual wealth or abuses of power for personal gain committed by government officials or politicians. Critics have charged that the commission tackles issues of a political nature that do not involve corruption per se. Thus, "...it has not remained politically impartial, the core quality of an independent agency."

The NACC is known for its lengthy investigations of corruption complaints filed by the public and for its lack of success in prosecuting the rich or powerful. NACC's perceived lack of performance has attracted scorn in Thailand. Typical is the assessment of a Bangkok Post editorial, "The biggest disappointment, as it has been for years, is the National Anti-Corruption Commission (NACC). As the leading graftbusters [sic] in the country ranked 101st least corrupt, the NACC has done little to justify itself...Since the military coup that promised crackdowns on corruption, the NACC has concluded only a single case—the malfeasance investigation which led to the indictment of ex-premier Yingluck Shinawatra. That is the very opposite of a war on corruption." One columnist went so far as to relabel the NACC the "National Allowing Corruption Commission".

== See also ==
- Corruption in Thailand
