= Liz MacKean =

British television reporter and presenter (1964-2017)

Liz MacKean (image taken from archive footage)

Elizabeth Mary MacKean (30 November 1964 – 18 August 2017) was a British television reporter and presenter. She worked on the BBC's Newsnight programme and was the reporter on an exposé of Sir Jimmy Savile as a paedophile which was controversially cancelled by the BBC in December 2011. The decision to axe the Newsnight investigation became the subject of the Pollard Inquiry. She and colleague Meirion Jones later won a London Press Club Scoop of the Year award for their work on the story. She also won the 2010 Daniel Pearl Award for her investigation of the Trafigura toxic dumping scandal.

MacKean went freelance after leaving the BBC, and reported on the Cyril Smith case for Channel 4's Dispatches series in September 2013.

In 2014, she reported on Russian vigilante gangs entrapping and attacking gay men in the documentary Hunted. Hunted won multiple awards, including the Grierson award for best current affairs documentary, and led to a follow-up, Hunted: Gay and Afraid, in which MacKean challenged American evangelical groups who support anti-gay legislation around the world.

MacKean was named Journalist of the Year by Stonewall in 2014. In November 2015, she was named their Journalist of the Decade.

== Early life ==
MacKean was born in Romsey, Hampshire, the second of four daughters of Tom MacKean, a circuit judge, and his wife Muriel (née Hodder). She was educated at Gordonstoun, a boarding independent school near the village of Duffus in north-east Scotland; she then attended the University of Manchester. After her graduation, she worked for a time in a theatre company called Juicy Fruits, as a stand-up comedian.

== Career ==
=== BBC and Newsnight ===
MacKean was a reporter at BBC Hereford and Worcester before going on to present BBC Breakfast News and becoming a BBC News correspondent.

She joined the BBC Newsnight programme in 2000, going on to become a specialist on Northern Ireland and covering the unfolding peace and political process, which included interviewing paramilitary figures from both the loyalist and republican sides, sometimes at personal risk. In 2009, she went to Côte d'Ivoire for the programme to report on the toxic dumping scandal involving the independent oil company Trafigura. In 2010, MacKean and five others shared the Daniel Pearl Award for Outstanding International Investigative Reporting for their story "Trafigura's Toxic Waste Dump", which "exposed how a powerful offshore oil trader tried to cover up the poisoning of 30,000 West Africans".

In a long-running series for Newsnight, MacKean highlighted the plight of teenagers leaving the care system, leading to a government promise of action in 2010.

=== Jimmy Savile and Newsnight ===
Newsnight launched an investigation into Jimmy Savile's paedophile activities immediately after his death on 29 October 2011. MacKean was the reporter and Meirion Jones was the producer; MacKean was very unhappy when the report was not transmitted before Christmas 2011 and tributes to Savile were broadcast on the BBC. She alleged that her editor Peter Rippon tried to "kill" the Savile story "by making impossible editorial demands". She told a Panorama programme in October 2012: "All I can say is that it was an abrupt change in tone from, you know, one day 'excellent, let's prepare to get this thing on air' to 'hold on'." MacKean also claimed in an email to a friend that Peter Rippon said he was under pressure from his bosses: "PR [Peter Rippon] says if the bosses aren't happy ... [he] can't go to the wall on this one."

The decision to cancel the Newsnight investigation became the subject of the Pollard Inquiry, named after its head, former Sky News executive Nick Pollard. On 18 December 2012, Pollard reported that the "Newsnight investigators were right. They found clear and compelling evidence that Jimmy Savile was a paedophile. The decision by their editor to drop the original investigation was clearly flawed and the way it was taken was wrong". He said Newsnight could have broken the story a year before ITV's Exposure. In a public statement afterwards, MacKean described the failure to run the story as a "breach in our duty to the women who trusted us to reveal that Jimmy Savile was a paedophile". However, the BBC has asserted that Panorama found no evidence to suggest that Rippon was pressured from above to drop the report ahead of the Christmas tribute to Savile.

MacKean took voluntary redundancy, while her producer Meirion Jones was sacked. "When the Savile scandal broke", she told Nick Cohen of The Observer in 2015, "the BBC tried to smear my reputation. They said they had banned the film because Meirion and I had produced shoddy journalism. I stayed to fight them, but I knew they would make me leave in the end. Managers would look through me as if I wasn't there. I went because I knew I was never going to appear on screen again". The story of how MacKean was treated by the BBC was reported by The Guardian in 2021.

=== Edinburgh Television Festival 2013 ===
In August 2013, MacKean told a session of the Edinburgh Television Festival that the row about excessive severance payments to senior BBC officials went to the heart of problems at the BBC where an "officer class" had been created which was treating the BBC as a "get-rich-quick scheme" for themselves and their colleagues. Later at the Festival, the then-Director General of the BBC, Tony Hall, picked up MacKean's remarks and said "I think someone used the phrase 'officer class' and I think that's right. I understand the resentment and anger that is caused". Hall said he would "heal the appalling divide" between staff and senior managers.

=== Subsequent reports ===
It was announced in May 2013 that MacKean had been hired for a "high-level investigation" for the Dispatches programme on Channel 4. MacKean's first broadcast investigation was The Paedophile MP. How Cyril Smith Got Away With It concerning the activities of the Liberal Party politician Cyril Smith. The programme was transmitted on 12 September.

MacKean made a series of programmes for Dispatches on changes to Britain's welfare system, as well as the award-winning Hunted and its follow-up Hunted: Gay and Afraid.

== Personal life and death ==
She lived with her wife, Donna Rowlands, and their two children. Former Newsnight colleague Jackie Long recalled: "Their wedding was a perfect illustration of Liz's character. As we all sat waiting, Liz and Donna walked down the aisle looking stunning to some rather unexpectedly traditional wedding music. Thirty seconds in, it turned into some mad hip hop and they danced the rest of the way down, both women laughing and looking delighted with it all".

MacKean's death at the age of 52 was announced on 18 August 2017. She died after suffering a stroke.
