= Quadro Tracker =

Bogus bomb detector

The Quadro Tracker, also known as the Positive Molecular Locator, was a fake "detection device" sold by Quadro Corp. of Harleyville, South Carolina between 1993 and 1996. Around 1,000 were sold to police departments and school districts around the United States on the basis that it could detect hidden drugs, explosives, weapons and lost golf balls. In 1996, the FBI declared it to be a fake and obtained a permanent injunction barring the device from being manufactured or sold. Three principals of Quadro Corp. were charged with mail fraud and conspiracy to commit mail fraud, but were acquitted in a trial held in January 1997.

== Description and claims ==
The Quadro Tracker was invented by Wade L. Quattlebaum, a former used car salesman from Harleyville, South Carolina. He was said to have devised the Quadro Tracker after he was trying to invent something to find lost golf balls. It was sold through his company, the Quadro Corporation, between 1993 and 1996. Around 1,000 Quadro Trackers were sold at prices of between $400 and $8,000 per unit.

The device consisted of three principal components. A "locator card" purportedly containing a "signature" of the object to be detected was inserted into a plastic "card reader" about the size of a tape cassette that could be attached to the user's belt. This was connected to a hand-held unit about 4 inches (10 cm) long to which a horizontally swivelling metal antenna was attached. The antenna would purportedly point to the item being sought when a suitable locator card was inserted into the "card reader".

According to the manufacturers, the Quadro Tracker could be used to detect items as varied as drugs, weapons, explosives, specific people, golf balls, alcohol, precious metal, dead pets or wild game animals. In the most expensive version of the device, costing $8,000, the user could insert Polaroid photographs of the item or person to be detected. According to Quadro Corp., "Quadro units have been designed to locate people from a photograph, as well as from a fingerprint. Thus missing prisoners, or escaped prisoners can be located with ease. The machine will identify an individual, no matter what disguise or surgery is undertaken. It has been tested over a distance of 500 miles, and will track, we believe, at any distance."

The device could supposedly even detect drugs after they had been ingested by a person. A marketing brochure stated: "The tracker will also locate specific drugs in solution. This means that even a person who had been using drugs will have traces in their bodily fluids, blood, etc. Thus the Tracker will indicate people who are using drugs, as well as those who are merely carrying it. Therefore extreme caution should be taken if searching a person, or making accusations, as they may, indeed, not be carrying drugs on them!"

Quadro Corp. claimed the device worked by oscillating "static electricity produced by the body inhaling and exhaling gases into and out of the lung cavity" to "charge the free-floating neutral electrons of the signature card with the major strength of the signal". The device's mechanism supposedly contained conductors, inductors and oscillators. It was claimed to be able to detect drugs hidden in air-tight containers, a bomb inside a building from outside or a criminal suspect 15 miles away.

== Users ==
Numerous US school boards, airports and police departments purchased the Quadro Tracker before it was banned. The Blue Valley Unified School District and Shawnee Mission School District in Kansas bought Quadro Trackers for $955 per unit to detect drugs and ammunition in local schools. Polk County Public Schools in Florida bought several Quadro Trackers to share between its schools. Houston School District paid $2,000 for two of the devices but never used them. School officials in the McKinney Independent School District declined to discontinue using the device even after it was banned, saying that they hoped it would be a deterrent: "We're not looking to nail a particular kid. We're looking to send a message." A similar justification was offered by the principal of Carencro High School in Louisiana: "I heard that there had been some trouble with it, but I tell you what. I'm impressed with it. And this is not necessarily going to be used to catch kids with drugs. If my having this thing keeps kids from bringing drugs on campus, it's worth its weight in gold."

The Texas Department of Public Safety used a Quadro Tracker in a failed attempt to find the body of the murdered 7-year-old Carlin Smith. Police departments in a number of counties, including Jefferson County, Florida and Madison County, Florida also bought the device. The Jefferson County, Texas narcotics task force spent $3,250 on a Quadro Tracker. The task force's commander later said: "We played with it in the office and got mixed results. Sometimes we'd find something, sometimes not. Our rate of success was about half. I think it was either blind luck or a ouija board effect. It's not near as consistent as (drug-sniffing) dogs, but there are no vet bills."

== Exposure ==
The Quadro Tracker enjoyed considerable commercial success before FBI agent Ron Kelly, stationed in Beaumont, Texas, learned about the device from a contact on the Narcotics Task Force of Jefferson Parish, Louisiana in 1995. He was suspicious of the claims made for the Quadro Tracker and obtained one of the devices, which he examined using the local courthouse's X-ray machine. It was immediately apparent that the Quadro Tracker was hollow; as Kelly later recalled, "It didn't take a lot of effort on our part to determine it was phony."

The FBI commissioned the FBI Laboratory's technicians and Sandia National Laboratories to examine the device. They found that the Quadro Tracker contained no electronics whatsoever. It was merely an empty plastic box in which the only metal parts were a couple of wires and the antenna, which were not connected to each other. The antenna was merely a transistor radio aerial. Attorneys for Quadro Corp. later contended that the inductors and oscillators supposed to be inside the device "aren't the type usually thought of by electronics experts". The "locator chip" was shown to be equally fake; one example put on display by the FBI contained dead ants that had been frozen and stuck onto paper with epoxy glue.

Kelly's office brought it to the attention of US Attorney Mike Bradford, who went to US District Judge Thad Heartfield to initiate action against Quadro Corp. In January 1996, Judge Heartfield issued an injunction against Quadro Corp. from "using the United States mails or private commercial interstate carriers, or causing others acting on their behalf to use the United States mails or private interstate carriers, to solicit customers or entities, promote, sell, transfer, or demonstrate the Quadro Tracker… and devices of a similar design marketed under a different name."

At the same time, the FBI sent a nationwide alert to law enforcement agencies: "A device marketed to law enforcement agencies nationwide, the Quadro Tracker… is a fraud. All agencies should immediately cease using the device if used as a basis for probable cause."

Bradford stated: "The company's claims about the capabilities and operations of the Quadro Tracker are fraudulent and false. There is no scientific basis whatsoever for the operation of the device." He said that Quadro Corp. had also falsely claimed in its promotional materials that the device had been tested or endorsed by the FBI, the US Drug Enforcement Administration and the National Institute of Justice, which had helped to persuade customers that the device was legitimate. Ron Kelly told the Dallas Morning News: "The only thing this accurately detects is your checkbook."

== Fraud investigation and trial ==
Following the injunction against Quadro Corp., the FBI pursued a criminal investigation against the company's principals and distributors. Two Houston-based Assistant US Attorneys who had acted as distributors – Guy Womack, who later represented US Army Specialist Charles Graner in the 2003-04 Abu Ghraib prisoner abuse scandal, and John Wagner – were implicated in the affair as licensed distributors for the Quadro Tracker in Alabama, Arkansas, New Mexico and Wyoming. A court was told in April 1996 that Womack could be a target of an investigation of possible conflicts of interest, false statements to investigators about his involvement with the Quadro Tracker and possible use of federal office equipment for private business. During the hearing, Womack pleaded the Fifth Amendment on 42 occasions, asserting his right not to incriminate himself. Womack was not charged, but he eventually resigned his post and paid a $5,000 settlement while denying any wrongdoing.

On August 22, 1996, a federal grand jury returned indictments on mail fraud charges against Quadro Corp.; Wade L. Quattlebaum, the company's president; Raymond L. Fisk, the vice-president; Malcolm S. Roe, the company secretary; and William J. Long, a distributor. The case came to trial in January 1997. On January 29, 1997 the three men were acquitted of all charges by a federal jury.

== Successors ==
Despite the demise of the Quadro Tracker, a succession of similar devices has appeared in widespread use in a number of countries including Iraq, Mexico and Thailand. A UK-based company, Global Technical, produced a device called the "MOLE programmable detection system" which Sandia National Laboratories described in a 2001 evaluation as "physically nearly identical" to the Quadro Tracker. Sandia reported that "the visible physical differences between the two products appear to be the product labels and the handle-programming chip – interchangeable on the Quadro Tracker, permanently fixed on the MOLE." It was found to perform no better than random chance. Global Technical subsequently produced a very similar device, the GT200, which was sold in large numbers to a number of countries as an explosives and drugs detector. This too was found to be perform no better than random chance, sparking a major controversy in Thailand in 2009–2010 over its effectiveness in connection with its high-profile use in combating the South Thailand insurgency and drug smuggling. A similar device produced by a different British company, the Alpha 6, is also in widespread use in Thailand but is due to undergo double blind testing to ascertain its effectiveness.

Another British company, ATSC, produced a very similar device called the ADE 651 which was sold to Iraq as a bomb detector. After a series of devastating bomb attacks in Baghdad and elsewhere which killed hundreds of people, its export to Iraq and Afghanistan was banned by the British government in January 2010 and the company director was arrested on suspicion of fraud. On 23 April 2013, the businessman behind the device, James McCormick, was convicted of three counts of fraud at the Old Bailey in London.

== See also ==
- List of topics characterized as pseudoscience
- ADE 651
- Alpha 6 (device)
- GT200
- Sniffex
- Dowsing
