= ADE 651 =

Fake bomb detector

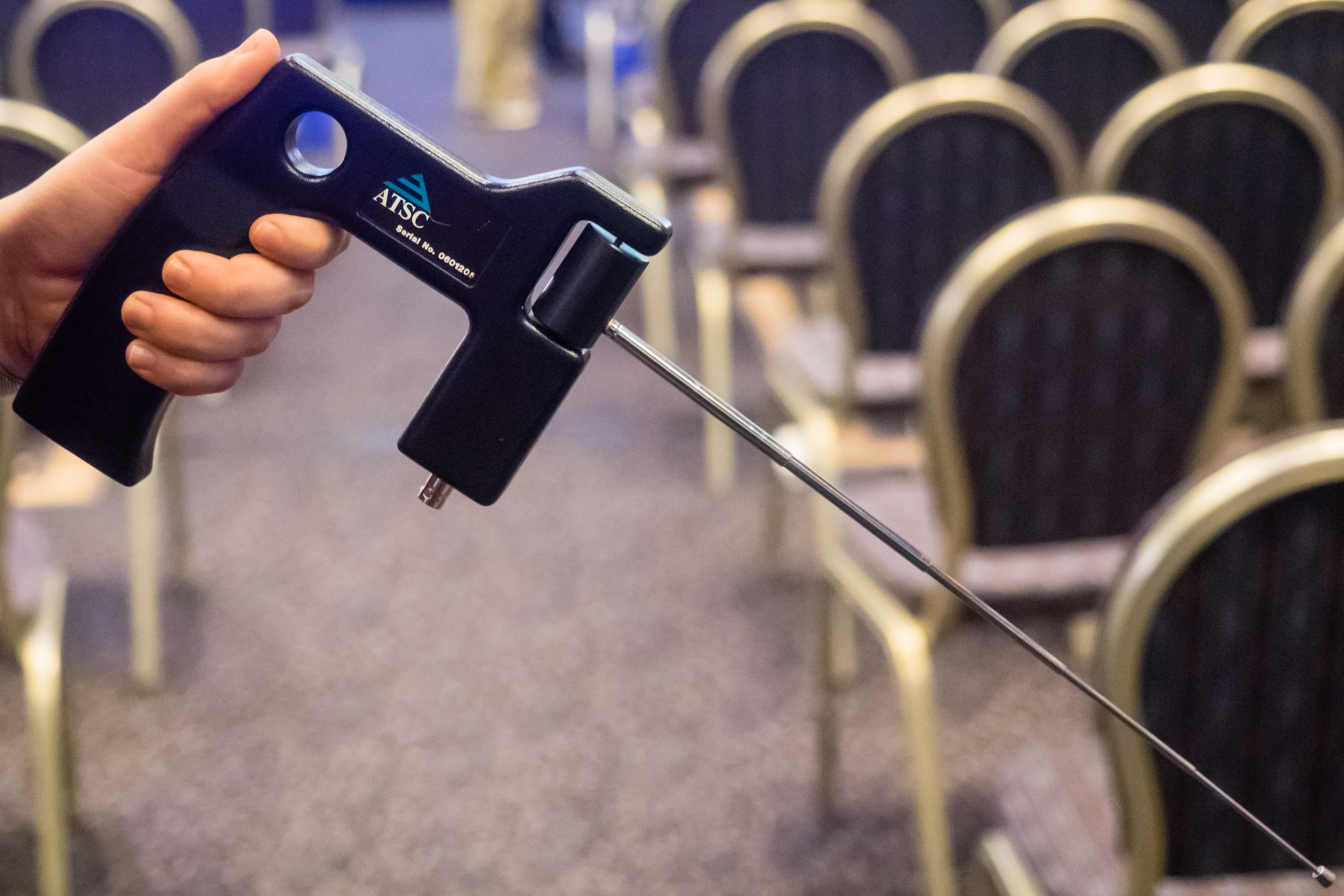
An ADE 651 device in 2016

The ADE 651 is a fraudulent bomb detector produced by the British company Advanced Tactical Security & Communications Ltd (ATSC). It was claimed to detect many substances, such as drugs or explosives, from long distances. The device was sold to various countries, particularly in Iraq, where the government was claimed to have spent £52 million for security operations. The product was invented by Jim McCormick, ATSC's managing director.

The device features a swiveling antenna attached to a plastic grip and was claimed to be charged by a user's static electricity. Users would insert "programmed substance detection cards" to supposedly detect specific substances, which were claimed to absorb the vapors of those substances. However, investigations revealed that the product was incapable of detecting anything, essentially being a dowsing rod. The ADE 651 was used primarily by Iraqi security forces for security checkpoints. Due to the false sense of security, many critics pointed to numerous incidents where bombings occurred despite the presence of the ADE 651 at security checkpoints, underscoring its ineffectiveness.

In 2010, the British government banned the exportation of the device to Iraq and Afghanistan after military officials' claims of its ineffectiveness. McCormick was later arrested on the suspicion of fraud. He was later convicted on three counts of fraud, receiving a ten-year prison sentence in April 2013.

== Device ==
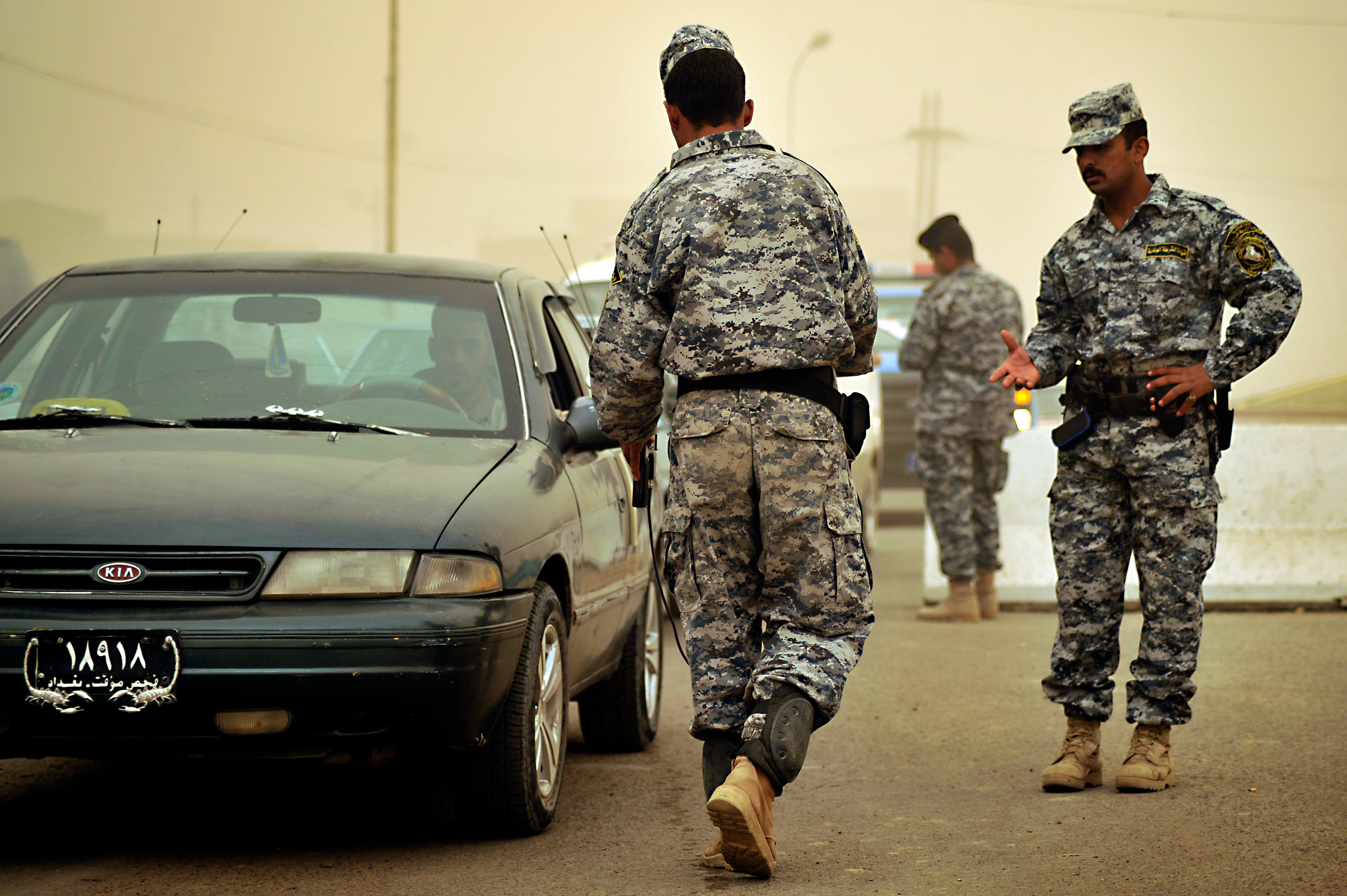
An Iraqi federal policeman in 2008 using an ADE 651

The ADE 651 consists of a swivelling antenna mounted via hinge to a plastic handgrip. It has no battery or other power source; its manufacturer claimed that it is powered solely by the user's static electricity. To use the device, the operator was to walk for a few moments to "charge" it before holding it at right angles to the body. After a substance-specific "programmed substance detection card" is inserted, the device is supposed to swivel in the user's hand to point its antenna in the direction of the target substance. The cards are claimed to be designed to "tune into" the "frequency" of a particular explosive or other substance named on the card.

Husam Muhammad, an Iraqi police officer and user of the ADE 651, described the proper use of the device as more of an art than a science. "If we are tense, the device doesn't work correctly. I start slow, and relax my body, and I try to clear my mind." The cards were supposedly "programmed" or "activated" by being placed in a jar for a week along with a sample of the target substance to absorb the substance's "vapours". Initially, McCormick reportedly used his own blood to "program" the cards for detecting human tissue, but eventually gave up even the pretense of "programming" them when demand for the devices was at its peak.

The use of the device by Iraqi and Pakistani security forces has become a major international controversy. The very similar GT200 and Alpha 6 devices, widely used in Thailand and Mexico, also came under scrutiny in the wake of the revelations about the ADE 651.

Promotional material issued by ATSC claimed that the ADE 651 could detect such item as guns, ammunition, drugs, truffles, human bodies, contraband ivory and bank notes at distances of up to 1 kilometre (0.62 mi), underground, through walls, underwater or even from aircraft at an altitude of up to 5 kilometres (3.1 mi). In a promotional video, McCormick claimed that the device could detect elephants from 48 kilometres (30 mi) away.

The ADE 651 was said to work on the principle of "electrostatic magnetic ion attraction". According to the promotional material, "by programming the detection cards to specifically target a particular substance, (through the proprietary process of electrostatic matching of the ionic charge and structure of the substance), the ADE651 could "by-pass" all known attempts to conceal the target substance. It has been claimed to penetrate lead, concrete, and other materials (including hiding in the body) used in attempts to block the attraction." Prosec, a Lebanese reseller of the ADE 651, claimed on its website that the device works on nuclear quadrupole resonance or nuclear magnetic resonance. McCormick told the BBC in 2010 that "the theory behind dowsing and the theory behind how we actually detect explosives is very similar".

== Development and manufacture ==
The ADE 651 is a descendant of the Quadro Tracker Positive Molecular Locator produced in the 1990s by Wade Quattlebaum, an American car dealer, commercial diver and treasure hunter. The Quadro Tracker was promoted by Quattlebaum initially as a device to find lost golf balls, and later as a means of detecting marijuana, cocaine, heroin, gunpowder, and dynamite using "carbo-crystalised" software cards. Like the ADE 651, it consisted of a hand unit on which a swinging antenna was mounted, linked to a box worn on the belt in which the cards were inserted to identify the "molecular frequency" of whatever the user wanted to detect. The cards were "programmed" by photocopying a Polaroid photograph of the target, cutting up the resulting copy, and pasting the pieces between two squares of plastic. Quattlebaum sold the devices for between $395 and $8,000 for a unit claimed to be capable of detecting humans, using a Polaroid photograph of the individual concerned for the "programming." A cheaper variant called the Golfinder or Gopher was available for $69.

Although the Quadro Tracker was enjoined from being manufactured or sold in the United States after a 1996 federal court case, Quadro's four principal figures escaped criminal sanctions after a jury failed to convict them. The company's secretary, Malcolm Stig Roe, moved to the United Kingdom after jumping bail and set up two new companies to sell fake detection devices. Some of the distribution agents broke away and began producing their own copies of the Quadro Tracker, such as the Alpha 6, Mole Programmable Substance Detector, Sniffex and GT200. The increase in security spending that followed the September 11 attacks in the United States opened up lucrative opportunities for sellers of security equipment.

The ADE 651's inventor was Jim McCormick, managing director of ATSC, was previously a salesman specialising in communications equipment but had no scientific or technical background. He established a private limited company (registered company 03407495) on 23 July 1997 under the name "Broadcasting and Telecommunications Ltd" which he subsequently renamed "Advanced Tactical Security & Communications Ltd" (ATSC). The company was based in a former dairy in Sparkford, Somerset. After he came across the Mole Programmable Substance Detector in 2000, McCormick signed up as a distribution agent, paying the UK-based manufacturer £10,000 for a single unit. The device was withdrawn from sale only a year later after it was investigated by Sandia National Laboratories on behalf of the US National Law Enforcement and Corrections Technology Center, and was found to be useless.

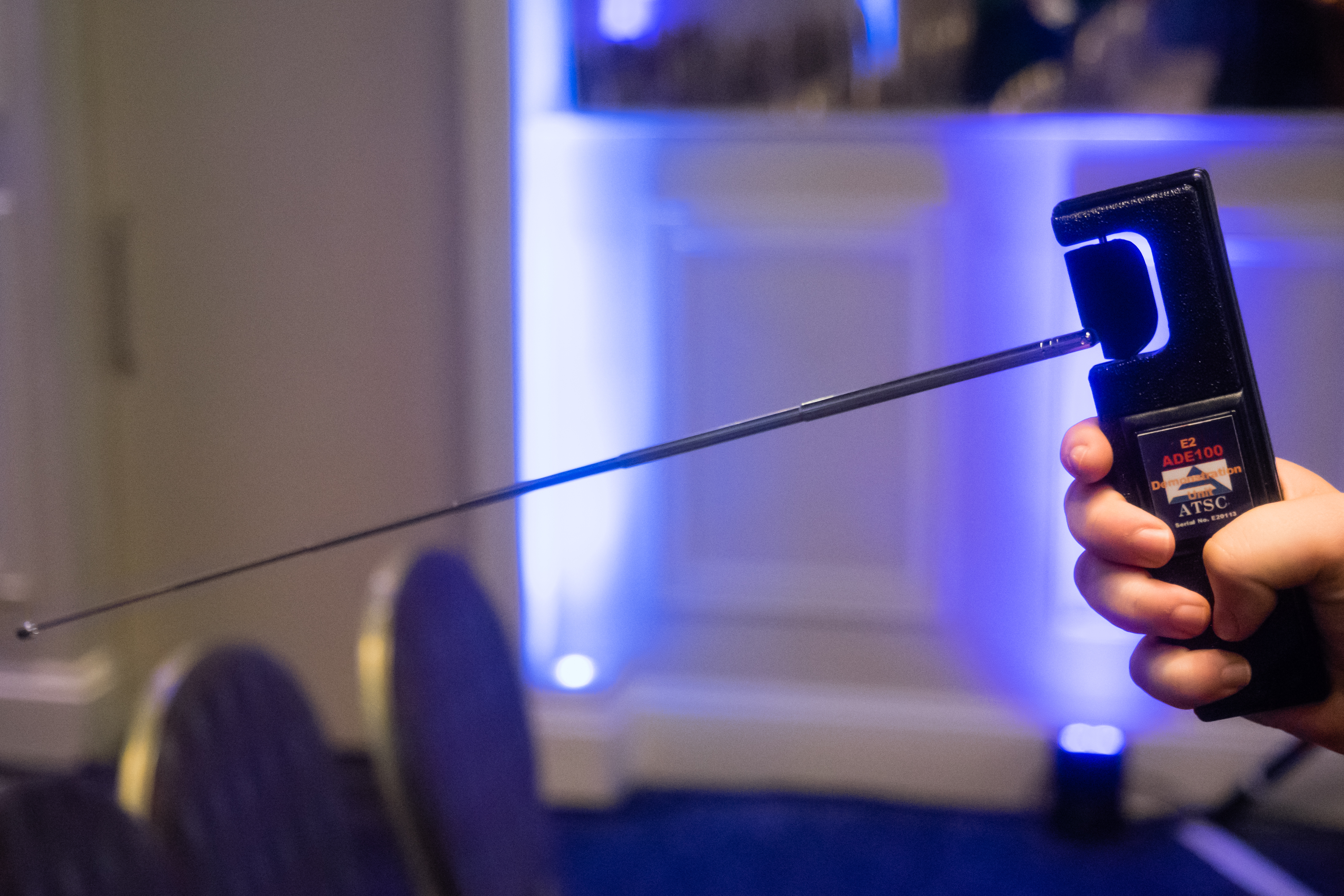
Photo of ADE 100 taken at QEDcon 2016

McCormick responded to this setback by copying Quadro's Golfinder, sticking an ATSC label onto it, renaming it the ADE (Advanced Detection Equipment) 100, and marketing it as a bomb detector. Between 2005 and 2009 he produced and sold several iterations of the design. One of these, the ADE 101, was sold for up to $7,000 per unit. He also marketed a version called the ADE 650. The ADE 651 was a further development of the same design. According to an associate of ATSC, the devices were manufactured at a cost of £150 each by suppliers in Great Britain and Romania. The associate told The New York Times: "Everyone at ATSC knew there was nothing inside the ADE 651." A whistleblower who worked to sell the device around the world with McCormick told the BBC that he once challenged McCormick over the device's effectiveness. McCormick was said to have answered that the device did "exactly what it's meant to ... it makes money."

ATSC was the principal vendor of the ADE devices. Its accounts at Companies House recorded a turnover of £1.78 million for the year to 31 July 2008, with a gross profit of £1.35 million. Its sole shareholder was its owner, McCormick. A sister company at the same location, ATSC Exports Ltd (registered company 06797101), was established on 21 January 2009, also as a private limited company. It had not filed any accounts as of January 2010. There were also several resellers of ATSC's fake bomb detectors, including Cumberland Industries UK, a company based in Kettering, Northamptonshire, and Prosec of Baabda, Lebanon.

== Users ==
The device has been sold to 20 countries in the Middle East and Asia, including Iraq and Afghanistan, for as much as US$60,000 each. The Iraqi government is said to have spent £52 million on the devices. It was widely used by the Iraqi Police Service and the Iraqi Army. The Iraqi Interior Ministry bought 800 of the devices in 2008 for £20m and a further 700 in 2009 for £32m, in no-bid contracts with ATSC. The Iraqi government paid up to £37,000 for the devices despite the purchase price being put at around £11,500. The Iraqi Army's Baghdad Operations Command announced in November 2009 that it had purchased another hundred of the devices. McCormick of ATSC has said that the devices were sold for £5,000 each, with the balance of the cost going on training and middlemen. The training included instructions to Iraqi users to "shuffle their feet to generate static electricity to make the things work."

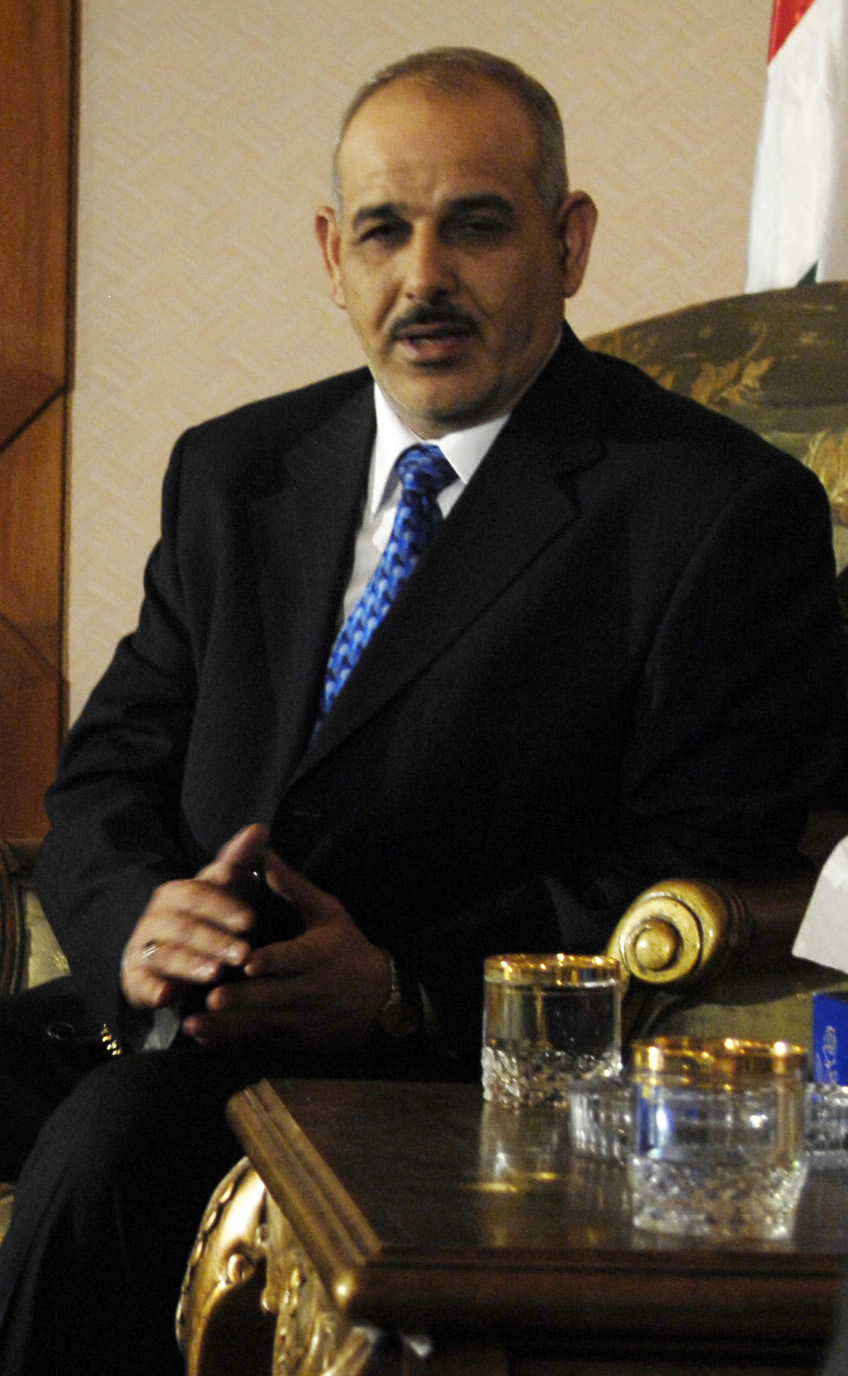
Iraqi Interior Minister Jawad al-Bulani, who defended the use of the ADE 651.

The ADE 651 has been used at hundreds of Iraqi police and Iraqi military checkpoints across the country, often replacing physical inspections of vehicles. Major-General Jihad al-Jabiri of the Interior Ministry's General Directorate for Combating Explosives has defended the device: "Whether it's magic or scientific, what I care about is detecting bombs. I don't care what they say. I know more about bombs than the Americans do. In fact, I know more about bombs than anyone in the world." He told a press conference that the ADE 651 has detected "hundreds of roadside bombs and car bombs" and any deficiencies were due to defective training in the device's use. The Iraqi Interior Minister, Jawad al-Bulani, also defended the device, telling Al Iraqiya television that the ADE 651 had "managed to prevent and detect more than 16,000 bombs that would be a threat to people's life and more than 733 car bombs were defused." He said: "Iraq is considered as a market area for many companies producing such devices ... and there are other rival companies trying to belittle the efficiency of these instruments the government is buying".

In Mexico, the Government of Colima bought an ADE 651 for more than $60,000. Also, in the photography accompanying an article about the GT200 published in newspaper La-Ch.com, a Mexican soldier can be seen using an ADE 651. It is possible that the Secretariat of National Defense also bought some units.

According to a promotional website for the ADE 651, the device was also used by the Lebanese Army, the Chinese Police, the Royal Thai Police and the Interior Ministry of the Kurdistan Regional Government in Iraqi Kurdistan. The website claimed that the Jordanian government required hotels to employ ADE 651 devices to scan vehicles entering underground car parks. ATSC's McCormick says that 20 countries have acquired the device, with purchasers including "the Saudis, Indian police, a Belgian drug squad, a Hong Kong correctional facility and the Chittagong navy." The police in the Belgian municipal region of Geel-Laakdal-Meerhout used the device to detect drugs. Pakistan's Airport Security Force also used the ADE 651 as a bomb detector at the Jinnah International Airport in Karachi.

== Effectiveness ==
The use of the ADE 651 prompted strong criticism, and eventually led to a ban on the device's export from the UK to Iraq and Afghanistan and a criminal investigation of its manufacturer. The Iraqi security forces' reliance on the device was highlighted by The New York Times investigation in November 2009, which reported that United States military and technical experts believed the device was useless. US Army Major-General Richard Rowe told the newspaper that "there's [no] magic wand that can detect explosives. If there was, we would all be using it. I have no confidence that these work". Sandia National Laboratories had carried out testing of several similar devices but found that "none have ever performed better than random chance". Retired US Air Force Colonel Hal Bidlack, a former national security aide in the Clinton and Bush administrations, condemned the device as "laughable, except someone down the street from you is counting on this to keep bombs off the streets". An Iraqi guard and driver for The New York Times, both of whom were licensed to carry firearms, were able to drive two AK-47 rifles and ammunition through nine police checkpoints that were using the device without any of them detecting the weapons.

Iraqi civilians complained that the device seems to have "an unerring attraction to shampoo and soapsuds". According to Iraqi police officer Jasim Hussein, "The vast majority of the people we stop, it's because of their perfume". A fellow officer, Hasan Ouda, commented that "Most people now understand it's what gets them searched, so they don't use as much." McCormick of ATSC falsely claimed that the apparent responsiveness of the ADE 651 was due to fragrances containing traces of the explosive substance RDX.

The veteran Canadian-American skeptic and magician James Randi publicly offered one million dollars to anyone who can prove the device's effectiveness as far back as October 2008. Randi issued a statement calling the ADE 651 "a useless quack device which cannot perform any other function than separating naive persons from their money. It's a fake, a scam, a swindle, and a blatant fraud. Prove me wrong and take the million dollars." According to Randi, nobody from ATSC ever responded.

The German news magazine Der Spiegel reported that the ADE 651 had been tested around 2008 in Israel but was "kicked out of the country". An Israeli explosives expert told the magazine: "The thing has absolutely nothing to do with the detection of explosives". When it was displayed at an arms and security fair in Beirut in April 2009, a visiting explosives expert described it as "one big fraud". Gadi Aviran, the head of the Israeli security firm Terrorgence, said: "If someone comes to an expert, claiming that he had developed a device that can detect the smell of explosives from several meters away, the expert must know that this is physically not possible."

The FBI has repeatedly issued alerts about dowsing rod devices being used as explosive detectors. It has described the Quadro Tracker, as "a fraud" and told all agencies to immediately cease using it. Another alert issued in 1999 told agencies: "Warning. Do not use bogus explosives detection devices." A US Army test of a similar device found that it was unable to detect a truck carrying a tonne of TNT when it drove up behind the operator. In June 2009, the US Army carried out a laboratory test including X-ray analysis on the ADE 651 that found it to be ineffective. According to Major Joe Scrocca, "The examination resulted in a determination that there was no possible means by which the ADE 651 could detect explosives and therefore was determined to be totally ineffective and fraudulent. As a result of that study, the US military notified all military and civilian personnel in Iraq that the bomb detection device is ineffective and should not be relied upon as a means of ensuring the safety of any personnel."

Caroline Hawley and Meirion Jones from the BBC's Newsnight programme investigated the ADE 651 in a report broadcast in January 2010, asking the University of Cambridge Computer Laboratory to assess one of the "programmed substance detection cards" used in the device to detect TNT. The laboratory found that the card contained only a standard radio frequency ID tag of the type used in stores to prevent shoplifting. According to the laboratory's Dr. Markus Kuhn, it was "impossible" for the card to detect anything and it had "absolutely nothing to do with the detection of TNT". The card could not be programmed, had no memory, no microprocessor and no form of information could be stored on it. Despite the high cost of the devices, the cards were worth only about two to three pence (3–5¢) each. Kuhn commented: "These are the cheapest bit of electronics that you can get that look vaguely electronic and are sufficiently flat to fit inside a card." The "card reader" was found to be an empty plastic box. Psychology professor Bruce Hood has noted that the swinging of the antenna is merely due to its loose assembly and unconscious wrist movements by the user (ideomotor phenomenon). Explosives expert Sidney Alford described the device as "immoral", telling Newsnight that "it could result in people being killed in the dozens, if not hundreds". Newsnight noted that thousands of people had indeed been killed and injured in devastating car bomb attacks in Baghdad such as the 25 October and 8 December 2009 Baghdad bombings, without the bombers being detected by the ADE 651 devices.

McCormick refused to be interviewed for the Newsnight investigation, but told The New York Times that ATSC would remain in business: "Our company is still fully operational." He told The Times that ATSC had been dealing with doubters for ten years and that the device was merely being criticised because of its "primitive" appearance. He said: "We are working on a new model that has flashing lights".

== Investigations and export ban ==
Your fraudulent conduct in selling so many useless devices for simply enormous profit promoted a false sense of security and in all probability materially contributed to causing death and injury to innocent individuals.

— Judge Mr. Richard Hone on sentencing McCormick to ten years in prison

=== United Kingdom ===
British and American military officers in Iraq brought the ADE 651's ineffectiveness to the attention of British police liaison officers in the country. The matter subsequently came to the notice of Colin Port, the Chief Constable of the Avon and Somerset Constabulary and Chair of the International Police Assistance Board, who personally ordered an investigation into McCormick and ATSC. In January 2010, ATSC's McCormick was arrested on suspicion of fraud. On 12 July 2012, McCormick was charged on three counts that between 15 January 2007, and 12 July 2012, he had in his possession or control an article for use in the course of or in connection with fraud contrary to Section 6 of the Fraud Act 2006; and three further charges that between the same dates he made or adapted, supplied or offered to supply an article knowing it was designed or adapted for use in the course of or in connection with, or intending it to be used to commit, or to assist in a fraud, contrary to Section 7 of the Fraud Act 2006.

Following the 2010 BBC Newsnight exposé of the device, the UK Government's Department for Business, Innovation and Skills announced that the BBC tests had shown that "the technology used in the ADE 651 and similar devices is not suitable for bomb detection" and they "could cause harm to UK and other friendly forces in Iraq and Afghanistan". It had therefore decided to ban the export of the ADE 651 and similar devices to those two countries under the Export Control Act 2002, with effect from 27 January 2010. The device had not previously been subject to export restrictions as it was non-military equipment. The department offered "cooperation with any investigation [the Iraqi authorities] may wish to make into how the device came to be bought for their military as bomb detection equipment." The banning order prohibited the export to Iraq and Afghanistan of "'electro-statically powered' equipment for detecting 'explosives'".

McCormick was tried in March–April 2013 at the Central Criminal Court in London. The court was told that "the devices did not work and he knew they did not work. He had them manufactured so that they could be sold – and despite the fact they did not work, people bought them for a handsome but unwarranted profit." McCormick had falsely represented himself as a member of the International Association of Bomb Technicians and Investigators, using the organisation's logo without permission. McCormick said that he had sold the ADE 651 and similar devices to security forces internationally but none had complained about them.

On 23 April 2013, McCormick was convicted on three counts of fraud. The chief investigating officer in the case, Detective Superintendent Nigel Rock, said:

There was no evidence demonstrated, that McCormick or his company ATSC UK conducted any proper research or development into the products manufactured; in fact he refused to submit the ADE devices to independent tests. He sold his detection devices to many governments, defence agencies and private institutions around the world. A large proportion of these were countries where there was and still remains a real risk of terrorism and criminality. Iraq was one country which between 2008 and 2010 bought 6,000 devices at a cost in excess of $40 million. The devices were used at numerous checkpoints within Iraq during this period. It is clear that both civilians and armed forces personnel were put at significant risk in relying upon this equipment. McCormick showed a complete disregard for the safety of those that used and relied upon the device for their own security and protection. He amassed many millions of pounds through his greed and criminal enterprise.

It was disclosed that McCormick had made millions of pounds from sales of the ADE 651, with which he had bought a farmhouse in Somerset, Nicolas Cage's former £3.5 million house in Bath with its own basement swimming pool, holiday homes in Cyprus and Florida, a £600,000 luxury yacht, and three horses for one of his daughters. The police declared that they would seek to "pursue his wealth" using the Proceeds of Crime Act 2002.

McCormick was sentenced to 10 years' imprisonment on 2 May 2013. In passing sentence, Richard Hone said: "Your fraudulent conduct in selling so many useless devices for simply enormous profit promoted a false sense of security and in all probability materially contributed to causing death and injury to innocent individuals." The judge noted that McCormick had not expressed any remorse or recognition of wrongdoing and said that his "culpability as a fraudster has to be placed in the highest category." Brigadier Simon Marriner told the court that the ADE 651 was clearly implicated in failing to prevent bomb attacks: "The inescapable conclusion is that devices have been detonated after passing through checkpoints. Iraqi civilians have died as a result."

McCormick's application for an appeal against his sentence was rejected by the Court of Appeal, with Judge Elgan Edwards stating: "The circumstances were quite appalling. The applicant knew precisely what he was doing. He did it for enormous profit and that conduct simply cannot and will not be tolerated." The judge commented that "if this case does not merit the maximum possible sentence, I don't know what does." McCormick was subsequently ordered to forfeit £7,944,834 under a proceeds of crime order to recompense the organisations defrauded by him, including £2.3 million to repay Iraq. His prison sentence was extended in 2018 by a further 2 years after he refused to meet a £1.8m shortfall in these repayments. He was released in 2019.

=== Iraq ===
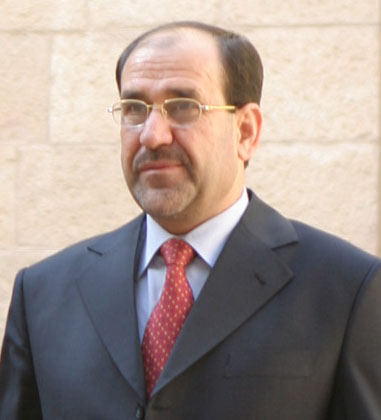
Nouri al-Maliki, the former Prime Minister of Iraq.

The failure of the ADE 651 to prevent a series of bombings in Baghdad and the circumstances of its procurement raised concerns in Iraq even before it became the subject of media exposés. The New York Times reported in November 2009 that Aqeel al-Turaihi, the Iraqi Interior Ministry's inspector-general, had begun an investigation into the contracts that the ministry had signed with ATSC. The Prime Minister of Iraq, Nouri al-Maliki, also ordered an investigation into the effectiveness of the devices following several bomb attacks. The Iraqi parliament did not order an official investigation but Iraqi MP Nadeem al-Jabiri said: "the security and defence committee in the parliament, headed by Hadi al-Amiri, is following up this matter as part of the parliament's duty as a monitoring entity." The Interior Ministry's report noted that "many lives have been lost due to the wands' utter ineffectiveness". The report and investigation were later suppressed, and it has been alleged that corruption was the reason, as 75% of the value of the contract "went to kickbacks received by [Iraqi] officials".

The BBC's revelations in January 2010 caused outrage in Iraq. A police officer told The New York Times: "Our government is to be blamed for all the thousands of innocent spirits who were lost since these devices have been used in Iraq." MP Ammar Tuma of the Iraqi Parliament's Security and Defense Committee said: "This company not only caused grave and massive losses of funds, but it has caused grave and massive losses of the lives of innocent Iraqi civilians, by the hundreds and thousands, from attacks that we thought we were immune to because we have this device." He told the Asharq Al-Awsat newspaper: "The tasks of the committee are limited to two tracks, [and that is] reaching the truth over what happened with regards to the signing of the contracts for these bomb detection devices; firstly by following up on the details of the contract and looking at the background of this, as well as the possibility of collusion by those who signed this contract, or whether this [ineffectiveness] is the result of technical weaknesses in these devices. Either of these [options] deserves accountability." He said that Defence Minister Abd al-Qadr Muhammed Jassim al-Obaidi had informed the Iraqi Parliament during emergency parliamentary hearings in 2009 that "the detection of car bombs and explosive material using these devices is very limited, and this increases the likelihood that these devices have low efficiency."

Another MP, Hussain al-Falluji, demanded that Iraqi security forces immediately cease using the ADE 651. His proposal to establish an investigative committee and seek to recover the money spent on the devices was supported by other parliamentarians. Hadi Al-Ameri, the head of the Parliament's Security and Defense Committee, said that he would push for an official investigation to "find out how this piece of equipment was sold to Iraq." If it was determined that ATSC was responsible he planned to "seek compensation via the ministry of foreign affairs." MP Haneen Kado said: "If we rely on these devices there is no point in having checkpoints. It makes the whole of Baghdad open to terrorist attacks. We are in a dangerous situation and there could be new bombings at any time. We must investigate exactly who bought and sold these detectors and see that they answer in court."

The Supreme Board of Audit in Iraq announced an investigation into the procurement of the ADE 651, focusing on the officials who had previously given assurances of the device's technical soundness. The Iraqi Army's Baghdad Operations Command, which had previously procured 100 of the devices, distanced itself from their use. Major General Qassim al-Moussawi said: "The devices have helped us in parts of our work but in some aspects they are not useful. Their performance does not match our aspirations. There is some percent of error in their performance and these devices must be updated." Iraqi Prime Minister Nouri al-Maliki was reported to have ordered a new investigation of how the devices had been procured, looking into whether there was any corruption involved.

According to the Iraqi Interior Ministry's inspector-general Aqil al-Turehi, he had investigated the device in 2008 but found it "inoperative" and costly and recommended that Iraq should not buy it. He told Reuters: "There was corruption associated with this contract and we referred to this and submitted our report to the Minister of the Interior. We said that the company which you made a contract with is not well-regarded internationally in the field of explosives detectors, and the price is very high and not commensurate with the abilities of this device." Al-Turehi said that the buying process had been "marred by suspicions over the equipment and the efficiency and value of the contracts. There were senior officials involved in these transactions." The initial investigation found that it could detect some bombs and the ministry went ahead with the contract despite al-Turehi's concerns. An unnamed Iraqi officer told the Agence France-Presse that "We know it doesn't work and that it has been banned [in Britain], but we are continuing to use it. It is bullshit. But still we are lying about it."

Despite the controversy, the device continued to be used at checkpoints across Iraq. The Iraqi Interior Ministry has defended the continued use of the ADE 651. In 2010, the then-head of the ministry's counter-explosives unit, General Jihad al-Jabiri, told the BBC that his organisation had "conducted several tests on them, and found them successful. In addition, we have a series of achievements officially documented by the Baghdad operations centre, from all the provinces, which establish that these devices detected thousands of bombs, booby-trapped houses and car bombs, and we've noticed a reduction of bombing activities to less than 10 per cent of what it was." A senior ministry official, Assistant Deputy Minister General Tareq al-Asl, told Asharq Al-Awsat: "The reason the director of the company was arrested was not because the device doesn't work, but because he refused to divulge the secret of how it works to the British authorities, and the Americans before them. I have tested it in practice and it works effectively and 100% reliably."

In February 2011, General al-Jabiri was arrested on corruption charges, centering on the ADE 651 device purchase. He was subsequently convicted of taking millions of dollars of bribes from McCormick and was imprisoned along with two other Iraqi officials. Up to 15 Iraqis are said to have been on McCormick's payroll, receiving money through a bank in Beirut.

Aqil al-Turehi said that he "feel[s] furious when I think that this gang of Jim McCormick and the Iraqis working with him killed my people by creating false security and selling such a useless device". In one incident, a vehicle carrying rockets and missiles travelled undetected through 23 Baghdad checkpoints equipped with the ADE 651. The false sense of security provided by the device had catastrophic effects for many Iraqi people, hundreds of whom were killed in bombings that the ADE 651 failed to prevent. The victim of one such bombing, 21-year-old Haneen Alwan, told the BBC that her life had been destroyed after she was caught in a bomb attack which caused injuries that killed her unborn child and prompted her husband to divorce her because of her extensive burns, which have so far required her to undergo 59 operations. She said: "When people passed through checkpoints using these devices, they thought they would be safe. But they are useless. The man who sold them has no conscience. He is morally bankrupt. How could he sell them just for money and destroy other people's lives?"

Fake bomb detectors such as the ADE 651 were still in use in Iraq as late as July 2016, and may have contributed to the July 2016 Baghdad bombings. This led to Iraq's Prime Minister, Haider al-Abadi, to order police to stop using the detectors.

=== Pakistan ===
Pakistan purchased ADE 651s for use by the Airports Security Force (ASF). After the ADE 651 became the focus of controversy for its role in Iraq, concerns were raised in Pakistan about its employment as a bomb detector by the ASF. A senior official at Jinnah International Airport denied that the ADE 651 was being used, claiming that the ASF had designed the device in use there, but other ASF officials acknowledged that their device "operated on the same principle as ADE-651." Pakistani scientists rejected the scientific basis on which the device was claimed to work: Professor Shahid Zaidi of Karachi University told the Pakistani newspaper Dawn that "there has to be an electric, magnetic or electromagnetic field for a device to work in such a manner. Furthermore static fields don’t move around the way it is being claimed by some. Also don’t forget that there are so many radio waves of different frequencies all around us. I just don’t see how this device would work." Dawn challenged the ASF to test the device to confirm its effectiveness but the ASF refused, insisting that the device works.

=== Belgium ===
The Belgian police bought an ADE 651 in 2008 for £12,800 to detect drugs, as a supposedly cheaper alternative to a dog. According to Superintendent Thierry Meunier, it was soon apparent that it was ineffective: "We had no results from it. We tried to use the device for detecting drugs in cars for several months. We also provided the detector to detectives seeking to detect drugs. The results again were negative."

=== Lebanon ===
The Lebanese Army bought ADE 651s. In addition, the United Nations Interim Force in Lebanon (UNIFIL) bought five ADE 651s at a cost of £46,000 to detect explosives in vehicles. ATSC offered the UN a further 80 of the devices, but declined to provide evidence that the ADE 651 could do what was claimed and suggested that the UN should carry out its own tests. UNIFIL did so over the course of two days but found that the device was "not fit for purpose".

=== Other countries ===
The ADE 651 was also sold to customers in Algeria, Bahrain, Bangladesh, Georgia, India, Iran, Kenya, Niger, Qatar, Romania, Tunisia, Saudi Arabia, Syria, the United Arab Emirates and Vietnam. The Mövenpick Hotel in Bahrain bought one to detect car bombs but, according to the hotel's head of security, who gave evidence to the Old Bailey trial, it could not even detect a firework: "It wasn’t working. It wasn’t working at all". The Mövenpick hotel ceased using the device following the intervention of the Bahrain Ministry of Interior in mid 2010 at the beginning of an enquiry in co-operation with UK Police which continued until the trial of McCormick in April 2013.

== Similar devices ==
The Quadro Tracker, also known as the Positive Molecular Locator, was a similar device sold by Quadro Corp. of Harleyville, South Carolina between 1993 and 1996.

An apparent recycling of the Quadro Tracker turned up as the DKLabs Lifeguard, which had a similar appearance and made ambitious claims about being able to locate survivors missing under rubble or hiding in shipping containers. It has been proven to be useless in tests by Sandia National Labs.

Another "remote substance detector" device, the Global Technical GT200, has come under scrutiny in Thailand in the wake of the controversy over the ADE 651. The Bangkok Post reports that the GT200 is virtually identical to the ADE 651 and has been described by critics as a "divining rod" which uses "controller cards", like the ADE 651, to find explosives. The Post attributes the death of several Royal Thai Police officers to its repeated failures to detect explosives.

Several other similar long range locator devices are being marketed in various countries, including the HEDD1 (formerly known as Sniffex Plus), marketed by Unival in Germany; Alpha 6, marketed by ComsTrac in the UK; PSD-22; and H3Tec.

In 2014, the Egyptian military presented C-FAST, a purported long-range detector of hepatitis C infection; its design was very similar to that of ADE 651.

In 2020, the Islamic Revolutionary Guard Corps (IRGC) unveiled Mostaan 110, an experimental medical device developed by the Basij militia. The IRGC claimed that the device was capable of detecting COVID-19 using electromagnetic radiation emitted from the device's antenna. These claims were met with widespread criticism from Iranian and international experts alike, with many commentators noting the device's strong resemblance to the ADE 651.

== See also ==
- List of topics characterized as pseudoscience
