= Sniffex =

Fraudulent explosive-detection systems

Sniffex and Sniffex Plus are fraudulent explosive detection systems produced by Homeland Safety International.

== Performance ==
An article in The Dallas Morning News in April 2007 describes Sniffex as a "divining rod" and states that "In a test by the U.S. Navy, Sniffex didn't register when two trucks passed within 20 feet, hauling a half ton of explosives." The Navy's counterterrorism technology task force tested Sniffex and concluded "The Sniffex handheld explosives detector does not work." Despite this, the US military bought eight for $50,000.

Although high performance is claimed in advertising for Sniffex, such claims have not been verified by objective double blind testing. During tests conducted at a public meeting by the president of the company, Sniffex did not detect test explosives when the user did not know in advance where they were located. Additionally, James Randi publicly called into question the validity of Sniffex and exchanged correspondence with the CEO offering one million dollars if Sniffex can do what the press releases claim.

The Sniffex device should not be confused with SniffEx, a prize-winning chemical vapor sensor developed at Oak Ridge National Laboratories (ORNL). That sensor was originally called "Sniffex" until Homeland Safety International enforced its trademark and asked ORNL to stop using the name.

== SEC lawsuits ==
In July 2008, the Securities and Exchange Commission filed lawsuits against six company officers for driving "the share price from 80 cents to about $6 by issuing 33 news releases that contained mostly false information about the product and the company's financial situation to earn a combined $32 million in illegal profits." In mid-July one suit was settled. In addition, the SEC charged Homeland Safety International, promoters of Sniffex, "of being little more than the front for a $32 million stock fraud scheme that enriched insiders at the expense of unsuspecting investors". The SEC complaint said the company "installed a figurehead CEO, named Paul B. Johnson, to hide the involvement of two Bulgarian residents who actually controlled the company" and "then issued a series of what the SEC alleges were false press releases." One of the press releases included a claim of "'impressive'" results from tests conducted by the New Mexico Institute of Mining and Technology. In reality, the tests were conducted by Johnson himself and the results were inconclusive". While the stocks rose the insiders sold, and the stock was trading at one tenth of a penny as of July 17, 2008. In July Mark B. Lindberg settled with the SEC and a week later pleaded guilty to wire fraud.

The HEDD1, reportedly a "Sniffex with a battery stuck on it", is marketed by the same company that markets Sniffex in Europe.

== See also ==
- List of topics characterized as pseudoscience
- ADE 651
- Alpha 6 (device)
- GT200
- Quadro Tracker
