= Alpha 6 (device) =

Fake British explosive and drug detector

The Alpha 6 is a fake "molecular detector" which, according to its manufacturer, can detect various substances from a distance, including explosives and drugs. The device has come under scrutiny following revelations about two similar devices, the ADE 651, which has become the focus of a fraud investigation in the United Kingdom, and the GT200, which tests have determined to perform no better than random chance.

The UK Government has banned the export of such devices to Iraq and Afghanistan in an order brought into force in January 2010 under the Export Control Act 2002 and has warned foreign governments that the GT200 and ADE 651 are "wholly ineffective" at detecting bombs and explosives. The government of Thailand, a major user of the Alpha 6, has ordered double blind testing of the device to determine whether it is effective.

== Description and background ==
The Alpha 6 is a hand-held device composed of a swivelling antenna mounted via a hinge to a plastic handset. Promotional literature claims that the device "is programmed to oscillate at the same frequency as that of the substance to be located." It is said to be powered by static electricity generated within the user's body "when breathing occurs". The device is claimed to be able to detect the "molecular signature" of various substances, including drugs, explosives, and ammunition in quantities as small as 15 nanograms, from distances of up to 300 metres (980 ft) away, through walls and under water. The "signature" of the substance to be detected is stored on a "recognition card" sealed inside the handset.

== Export ban and criminal proceedings ==
Following controversy over a similar device, the ADE 651, the UK Government issued an order under the Export Control Act 2002 that came into force on 27 January 2010, banning the export to Iraq and Afghanistan of "'electro-statically powered' equipment for detecting 'explosives'", on the grounds that such equipment "could cause harm to UK and other friendly forces". The export ban covers all such devices, including the GT200.

Officers from the City of London Police Overseas Anti-Corruption Unit subsequently raided the offices of manufacturers Scandec and two other makers of similar "detectors". A large amount of cash and several hundred of the devices and their component parts were seized. The police said that they were investigating on suspicion of fraud by false representation and were also investigating whether bribes had been paid to secure contracts to supply the devices.

Pursuant to the Fraud Act of 2006, five people were charged in July 2012 by the Overseas Anti-Corruption Unit (OACU) 2012 on charges related to the Alpha 6 and the similar GT200, ADE 651, and XK9 devices. Among the allegations were that these devices were "dishonestly represented as capable of detecting explosives."

The case went to trial in May 2013 with three people being accused of fraud in relation to the Alpha 6. During the case the defendants claimed that by "programming" the Alpha 6 with a photograph of Madeleine McCann they had been able to locate the missing child; one defendant travelled to Ireland to continue the search. The defendant who had distributed the device was later cleared in June 2013, whilst the other defendants, the manufacturers of the product, face a retrial after the jury failed to reach a verdict.

In the retrial Samuel Tree was sentenced to three and a half years while his wife Joan received 300 hours community service.

== Use in Thailand ==
The government of Thailand was a major purchaser of the Alpha 6. The country's Interior Ministry bought 479 of the devices and the Office of the Narcotics Control Board (ONCB), part of the Justice Ministry, bought a further 15. The ONCB began using the devices in 2007 to combat drug smuggling in northern Thailand. It bought its units at a price of 400,000 baht (US$12,000) apiece. It claimed that its Alpha 6 units were highly effective, achieving a 70 percent success rate and helping to identify drug traffickers and smuggled drugs. The head of the OCNB, Police Lt General Krissana Phon-anan, said that the devices work so well that the agency no longer uses dogs to detect narcotics. The Interior Ministry plans to procure more Alpha 6 devices and train 1,000 volunteers to use them. Its own Alpha 6 devices were procured at a much higher price than those of the Narcotics Control Board, at 720,000 baht (US$21,600) each. The total cost of the devices has been around 351 million baht (US$10.6 million).

Following a controversy about the effectiveness of the GT200 "remote substance detector", similar questions were raised about the Alpha 6. Thai Prime Minister Abhisit Vejjajiva ordered scientific tests of the GT200 in February 2010 to verify its claimed effectiveness. The tests found that the GT200's detection rate was no more effective than random chance. In the wake of the GT200 scandal, the Science and Technology Ministry announced that it would broaden its tests at the request of the Ministry of the Interior and the Ministry of Justice to verify the claimed effectiveness of the Alpha 6.

The Alpha 6 devices were demonstrated and supplied to the Thai authorities by a local Thai. The GT200 was manufactured by the British company, Global Technical, and distributed by its Thai distributor, Avia Satcom Co.

The Alpha 6 drugs detector case was declared "closed" in May 2018 by Thailand's National Anti-Corruption Commission (NACC) after 10 years of investigation. Three minor officials are deemed responsible for the purchase of 493 of the "worthless [Alpha 6] boxes" at a cost of 350 million baht. The British scammer who sold the devices to Thailand was found guilty of fraud in the UK and imprisoned in 2013. The Bangkok Post fumed that, "The disappointing and unsatisfactory outcome of this astoundingly long investigation shows up the enormous failings of the anti-graft commission."

== See also ==
- List of topics characterized as pseudoscience
- ADE 651
- Sniffex
- Quadro Tracker
