= GT200 =

Fraudulent drug and explosive detector

The GT200 is a fraudulent "remote substance detector" that was claimed by its manufacturer, UK-based Global Technical Ltd, to be able to detect, from a distance, various substances, including explosives and drugs. The GT200 was sold to a number of countries for a cost of up to £22,000 per unit, but the device has been described as little more than "divining rods" which lack any scientific explanation for why they should work. After the similar ADE 651 was exposed as a fraud, the UK Government banned the export of such devices to Iraq and Afghanistan in January 2010 and warned foreign governments that the GT200 and ADE 651 are "wholly ineffective" at detecting bombs and explosives. The owner of Global Technical, Gary Bolton, was convicted on 26 July 2013 on two charges of fraud relating to the sale and manufacture of the GT200 and sentenced to seven years in prison.

== Description and background ==
The GT200 consists of three main components—a swivelling antenna mounted via a hinge to a plastic handgrip, into which "sensor cards" can be inserted. It requires no battery or other power source and is said to be powered solely by the user's static electricity. The device becomes active when the operator starts moving and detects various substances via "DIA/PARA magnetism". It is made by Global Technical Ltd of Ashford, Kent. The company (registered number 03300333) was established as a private limited company on 9 January 1997 with Gary Bolton as director. A number of overseas partners including Segtec, Napco, Nikunj Eximp Enterprises, Electronic K9 Singapore, Aviasatcom and Concord Consulting have distributed its products in Central America, the Middle East, India, Southeast Asia and Thailand respectively. Global Technical also had a sister company, Global Technical Training Services Ltd (registered company 03793910), which was established on 23 June 1999 but is now dissolved.

Promotional material issued about the GT200 claims that it can detect a wide variety of items including ammunition, explosives, drugs, gold, ivory, currency, tobacco and "human bodies" at ranges of up to 700 metres (2,300 ft) on the surface, depths of up to 60 m (200 ft) underground or under 800 m (2,600 ft) of water, or even from aircraft at an altitude of up to 13,000 feet (4,000 m). A "Substance Sensor Card" inserted into the device is said to create an "attracting field" utilising "dia/para magnetism" between the device and the substance that is to be detected. The field is claimed to make the antenna of the GT200 lock onto a signal, indicating the direction in which the substance can be located. According to the promotional material, if the device is used correctly, it "can detect substance(s) through walls, (even lead-lined and metal ones), water, (fresh and salted), fresh and frozen food, (fish, fruit, tea, coffee, ice), vacuum flask, containers, petrol and diesel fuel and even buried in the earth" and can detect narcotics for up to two weeks after they have been ingested by a target individual.

According to the Thai newspaper The Nation, the GT200 is "just a new name" for a previous Global Technical product, the MOLE programmable substance detection system. It operated in the same way as the GT200, using a swinging antenna to point to a target material indicated via "programmable cards" inserted into a reader. The MOLE was tested in the United States in 2002 by Sandia National Laboratories but was found to perform no better than random chance. According to the Sandia report, the MOLE appears "physically nearly identical" to a product Sandia examined in October 1995 called the Quadro Tracker, which was marketed by a South Carolina company but which was banned in 1996 and the makers prosecuted for fraud.

A BBC Newsnight television investigation of the GT200 in January 2010 found that the "sensor card" consisted only of two sheets of card between which was sandwiched a sheet of paper, white on one side and black on the other, that had been cut off from a larger sheet with a knife or scissors. It contained no electronic components whatsoever. When the device's case was dismantled, it too was found to contain no electronic components. Explosives expert Sidney Alford told Newsnight: "Speaking as a professional, I would say that is an empty plastic case." Gary Bolton of Global Technical said that the lack of any electronic parts "does not mean it does not operate to the specification."

A GT200 unit was examined on Thailand's Nation Channel in an interview with Lt Col Somchai Chalermsuksan of the Thai Central Institute of Forensic Science. The host commented that "there is no battery here or way of powering it" and that the bottom half of the device was completely empty. Asked if there was anything in the sealed top half of the device, Lt Col Somchai said: "There is nothing. Once there was an accident and the device came apart. There was nothing inside." The host concluded: "So it is just two pieces of plastic put together."

=== Export ban, police investigation and criminal charges ===
Following controversy over a similar device, the ADE 651, the UK Government issued an order under the Export Control Act 2002 that came into force on 27 January 2010, banning the export to Iraq and Afghanistan of "'electro-statically powered' equipment for detecting 'explosives'", on the grounds that such equipment "could cause harm to UK and other friendly forces". The export ban covers all such devices, including the GT200.

Officers from the City of London Police Overseas Anti-Corruption Unit subsequently raided the offices of Global Technical and two other makers of similar "bomb detectors". A large amount of cash and several hundred of the devices and their component parts were seized. The police said that they were investigating on suspicion of fraud by false representation and were also investigating whether bribes had been paid to secure contracts to supply the devices.

On 27 February 2011 the British government told BBC Newsnight that it had helped Global Technical sell the GT200 around the world between 2001 and 2004. Royal Engineers sales teams demonstrated the devices at arms fairs and the UK Department of Trade and Industry helped two companies sell the GT200 and similar products in Mexico and the Philippines. On 12 July 2012, Andrew Penhale, Deputy Head of the Crown Prosecution Service's Central Fraud Division, authorised charges against six individuals, including Gary Bolton, for the manufacture, promotion and sale of a range of fraudulent substance detector devices. Bolton was formally charged at the City of London Magistrates' Court on 19 July with one count of fraud by false representation and one count of making or supplying an item for use in fraud between January and July 2012, and pleaded not guilty to both charges. Bolton was convicted on 26 July 2013 at The Old Bailey and released on bail pending sentence. Bolton was subsequently sentenced to 7 years Imprisonment on 20 August 2013. Bolton was also ordered to pay over £1.25 million to prevent seven additional years of imprisonment. Bolton reportedly made £45 million selling the fraudulent devices.

== Users ==
=== Thailand ===
The GT200 was used extensively in Thailand. Reportedly, over 800 GT200 units were procured by Thai public bodies since 2004; these include the Royal Thai Army's purchase of 535 units for combating the South Thailand insurgency and another 222 units for use in other areas, the Royal Thai Police's purchase of 50 units for use in Police Region 4 (Khon Kaen), 6 units acquired by the Central Institute of Forensic Science and an equal number acquired by the Customs Department, the Royal Thai Air Force's purchase of 4 units, and the single unit acquired by the Chai Nat police. Other agencies, such as the Border Patrol Police Bureau and the Office of the Narcotics Control Board, use a similar device — the Alpha 6 from the company Comstrac — to detect drugs. According to the Bangkok Post, the first to procure the GT200 was the Royal Thai Air Force, in 2006, for purposes of detecting explosives and drugs at airports; the next was the Royal Thai Army. According to Lt Gen Daopong Rattansuwan, the Deputy Chief of Staff of the Royal Thai Army, each GT200 bought by the army cost 900,000 baht (£17,000), rising to 1.2 million baht (£22,000) if 21 "sensor cards" were included with it. In total, Thailand's government and security forces have spent between 800 and 900 million baht (US$21 million) on the devices. Figures updated in 2016 claim that the Thai government spent 1.4 billion baht on the purchase of 1,358 devices between 2006 and 2010. Even after the efficacy of the device was debunked by Thai and foreign scientists, Prime Minister Prayut Chan-o-cha, then army chief, declared, "I affirm that the device is still effective." The Bangkok Post commented that, "The GT200 case was a unique scandal because the devices...seemed to fool only the people closely connected to their sale and purchase."

In total, 14 government agencies were duped into buying GT200s: the Central Institute of Forensic Science; Royal Thai Army Ordnance Department; Customs Department; Provincial Administration Department; Royal Thai Aide-De-Camp Department; Provincial Police of Sing Buri and Chai Nat; Songkhla Provincial Administration; Royal Thai Navy Security Centre; and five provinces: Phitsanulok, Phetchaburi, Phuket, Yala, and Sukhothai.

The head of Ava Satcom Ltd., the Thai company that sold eight GT200 devices to the Royal Thai Aide-De-Camp Department in 2008, was sentenced in September 2018 to nine years in prison and fined 18,000 baht. The purchase cost the government more than nine million baht. The week previously a court had sentenced him to 10 years in prison for selling GT200 devices to the army for 600 million baht. The judgements will be appealed on the grounds that the GT200s were imported on the orders of the military. The defense claims that army officers approached Ava Satcom with instructions, and specific specifications to buy, import, and resell 535 GT200s to the army. The military men involved have never been censured for their obvious gullibility and possible wrongdoing.

=== Mexico ===
The device was widely used in Mexico, where it was jokingly called "The devil's Ouija" (Spanish: La Ouija del diablo), as security forces ineffectively used it in an attempt combat drug traffickers and to search for explosives.

The Mexican government has spent over 340 million pesos (US$27 million) buying GT200s at a cost of 286,000 pesos (US$22,000) each. According to the government of Guanajuato state, the federal government has bought more than 700 GT200s. State governments have also bought their own GT200s; the device is reported to be in use by police in the Mexican states of Tabasco, Sonora, Sinaloa, Durango, Michoacán and Baja California. The Mexican military also utilises the GT200. In 2008 the Secretariat of National Defense had purchased 300 GT200s for use throughout the country, including at 133 strategic locations. By late 2009 the figure had increased to 521 GT200s, which had been deployed to 11 strategic checkpoints and 284 regional control stations around the country. In the violence-wracked city of Ciudad Juárez, the newspaper Excélsior reported that "military squads roam the streets and go from house to house, using a molecular detector known as GT200" to find weapons, drugs and money. Prison personnel in Juárez and its parent state, Chihuahua, have been provided with GT200s to detect escape tunnels being dug by prisoners.

=== African states ===
The device is used to detect smuggled ivory in the central African states of Zambia, Uganda, Kenya, Tanzania and the Republic of the Congo. The Lusaka Agreement Task Force (LATF) and the United Nations Environment Programme bought 15 GT200s in 2005 at a cost of $5,000 each and distributed them to the five LATF member states. In Uganda, the GT200s were installed at Entebbe International Airport, border crossings and internal checkpoints. A report submitted by Kenya to the CITES Standing Committee in 2006 stated that "three staffs from Tanzania were trained on the use of GT 200 Ivory Detector for the purposes of law enforcement against illegal dealing in ivory products, in the country. Four (4) Ivory Detectors are currently in place and are used for law enforcement activities especially at entry and exit points."

=== Elsewhere ===
The GT200 has been demonstrated in India for organisations including the Central Reserve Police Force, Indo-Tibetan Border Police, National Security Guards, Narcotics Control Bureau and the Bureau of Civil Aviation Security and was procured by the Dubai Customs in 2009. Hotels in Manila in the Philippines use it to detect bombs. It is also in use in Lebanon, Jordan and China.

== Controversy over use ==
=== Thailand ===
The effectiveness of the GT200 has been the subject of controversy in Thailand, where the device has been reported to have been implicated in several deaths when it failed to detect improvised explosive devices which detonated, killing civilians and personnel from the security forces.

Three members of a border patrol police unit were killed on 7 November 2008 in Panare District when the GT200 they were using failed to detect a bomb planted on a road. In the Mueang Yala District of Yala Province, security forces used a GT200 to investigate the scene of the murder of two officials, but were unable to detect a follow-up boobytrap bomb, which exploded just after they had declared the area to be clear of bombs.

Numerous people were killed and injured in two bomb attacks in October 2009 in which the GT200 was used by security forces. On 6 October 2009, a car bomb exploded opposite the Merlin Hotel in Su-ngai Kolok, killing one person and injuring 20, after it had been "scanned" using a GT200 and declared to be free of explosives. A motorcycle bomb exploded on 19 October in Yala, injuring another 26 people, again after a scan with a GT200 had returned negative results for explosives.

False positives have also been reported, with civilians being arrested after a GT200 "detected" traces of explosives on them. Similar erroneous readings were reported to have caused "pandemonium" at Pattani Hospital. On one occasion the device was reported to have "incriminated the top of a coconut tree", though it was said the alert turned out to have been triggered by a plastic bag with vegetable oil inside. Thai journalist Charoon Thongnual reported personally experiencing the GT200 showing false positives:

A device used by a defence volunteer pointed repeatedly to a motorcycle parked in front of the Pattani Provincial Court. However, a search of the motorbike discovered nothing illegal. In another incident, a device pointed at a handbag carried by a female college student in Pattani who was strolling with friends near the CS Hotel. A search of her bag found cosmetics and other items that were completely lawful.

The Bangkok Post reported on a Thai army field training session using the GT200 near Yala city in November 2009, in which a bomb squad using GT200 devices repeatedly failed to detect explosives:

Various types of explosives had been placed at different spots, unknown to the personnel using altogether four GT200 devices. After more than 30 minutes, all four devices failed to locate the explosives. Eventually, the head of the bomb disposal squad showed them where the bombs were hidden, much to the embarrassment of all concerned. One of the authors of this story, Mr Surapan, did his own detective work as well. While the bomb squad was busy scouring the roadside bushes, he drove into town and borrowed a few sticks of dynamite from a security officer, who is a longtime friend. He wrapped the dynamite with tin foil and black carbon paper and drove back to the same location. Mr Surapan parked his car on the roadside about a metre behind a car belonging to one of the officers. Then he placed the wrapped dynamite sticks under the bonnet of his car. All four GT200 devices indicated nothing unusual as the handlers walked past his car. But they led the officers to the car in front, where several automatic rifles were kept.

Hundreds of people are said to have been detained by Thai security forces on the basis of GT200 readings. According to Human Rights Watch, about 10 per cent of those detained on suspicion of involvement in the insurgency have been arrested on this basis. In one village in Narathiwat Province, 32 people were arrested after GT200s were used to "detect" traces of explosive substances on their bodies. Most of them were detained without charge for an extended period. Brad Adams of Human Rights Watch commented: "It is common during security sweeps in the south to see Muslim men lined up on the roadside with their shirts off while being screened by a GT200. Many of those implicated by the GT200 have been arrested and then tortured."

The Working Group on Justice for Peace, a Thai non-governmental human rights organisation, published an article in November 2009 that was strongly critical of the GT200: "The operation of the device is causing a lot of suspicion among scientists in Thailand for several reasons. According to them, the procedure of finding suspicious objects is not based on a reliable scientific method. Besides, GT200 is not being used by credible international organisations."

==== Government response ====
Concerns were raised by some within the Thai establishment. General Pathomphong Kasornsuk, the former chief advisor of the Supreme Command, urged Prime Minister Abhisit Vejjajiva to investigate the procurement scheme for the GT200 devices and other elements of the counter-insurgency campaign in southern Thailand. Jetsada Denduangboripan, a scientist at Chulalongkorn University, told a committee of the House of Representatives of Thailand in January 2010 that "The GT200 cannot detect explosives. It is not scientific equipment. It works on the users' hunch. It is similar to a wood stick that people used to detect dead bodies buried in a cemetery." He used a set of pliers, a radio antenna and a piece of paper to produce a "bomb detector" that he said worked just as effectively as the GT200. The House committee on national security said that it would investigate the GT200 further and set up an inquiry into its effectiveness that would involve the military and scientists.

Deputy Interior Minister Thaworn Senneam told journalists after a fatal bomb attack in southern Thailand on 6 October 2009 that the police had failed to detect the bomb "because the officer handling the GT200 detector was too nervous... His nervousness caused his temperature to rise which, in turn, caused the bomb detector to malfunction." He announced that in future two officers would be assigned to use the device, with the second ready to take over from the first if he was "not ready to use it."

Following media criticism, army chief General Anupong Paochinda accused the press of working for Avia Satcom's competitors. He organised a demonstration to "prove" to the media that the devices worked. Fourth Army chief Lt. General Pichet Wisaijorn told the press, "It is not Gen Anupong saying the device is effective. Officers in the South and the North and the current and former 4th Army commanders also say the same thing. We have bought them and if the users insist they are good, that's end of the discussion." Joint Military Police Civilian Taskforce commander Lt-General Kasikorn Kirisri said any issues with the GT200 scanner were due to human error. According to Col Banpot Poonpian of the Thai Army's Internal Security Operations Command, the GT200 has "proved effective although it may not work perfectly". It was used only as an auxiliary tool to detect something suspicious, with two other devices being used to identify the suspicious object. A recent investigation had found that failures were the result of users relying solely on the GT200 and not using the other two devices, following which bomb disposal personnel had undergone additional training.

According to a commander in the army, which makes extensive use of the device, how well it works "depends on the static electricity stored in the body of its user. If the person using the detector is feeling weak physically, his static electricity will be down and weaken the effectiveness of the device."

After the BBC reported that the British government was to warn foreign governments that the GT200 and other similar devices were "wholly ineffective" at detecting bombs and explosives, General Anupong said that the procurement of more GT200s would be halted if the device was proven to be ineffective, although existing GT200s would continue to be used for bomb detection purposes. Other senior military figures continued to insist that the device worked as advertised, saying that it had detected explosives, weapons and narcotics in 173 out of 236 incidents, with a success rate higher than 80 per cent. Army Spokesperson Sansern Kaewkamnerd insisted that the GT200 units worked with 100 per cent confidence and that the Army was ready to prove the units' effectiveness any time, anywhere. Pornthip Rojanasunand, Director of the Central Institute of Forensic Science, also defended the use of the GT200 devices, claiming that they were effective when searching for bombs and even nails under water. She said: "I do not feel embarrassed if the bomb detector is proven ineffective. Personally, I have never handled the device myself. But my people have used it and it is accurate every time. Long long time ago, people believed that the Earth is flat and anyone who said otherwise faced execution. Things which are not visible does not necessarily mean they do not exist. The devices are there and no one has the right to ban their use. I will continue to use it."

==== Review ====
At the start of February 2010, Prime Minister Abhisit Vejjajiva said that he agreed that the device should be tested to determine whether it was effective. He told the media: "It's dangerous if you think something unworkable is working. So we must test to see whether the device works. We should also discuss what we should do." If the devices were found to be ineffective, an investigation would be ordered to determine why they had been bought.

Following Abhisit's intervention, the Thai Cabinet ordered the Ministry of Science and Technology to carry out tests on the GT200. The Interior and Justice Ministries also commissioned the ministry to test the similar Alpha 6 device, which they used to search for drugs. The evaluation team included engineers, scientists, military, police and representatives from the Office of the Narcotics Control Board and the National Statistics Office. The tests were carried out by the National Electronics and Computer Technology Center at the Thailand Science Park's Sirindhorn Science Home in Pathum Thani, in a process involving 30 GT200 operators, 30 members of the investigating committee and 10 independent observers. Ten GT200 units were used in double blind tests to detect 20 grams of C4 explosive concealed in one of four identical plastic boxes. However, the testers were not allowed to examine the interior of the GT200 because of confidentiality agreements prohibiting the disclosure of "any information regarding the device."

The test results were announced by Prime Minister Abhisit on 16 February, who disclosed that the investigators found that the GT200 had correctly detected explosives only four times in 20 tests. He said, "The result has no statistical significance. The performance is equivalent to random chance." Following the test results, he ordered security forces to stop buying the devices and review the use of those already in service. He said that the government would consider suing the GT200's manufacturer, Global Technical, and its Thai distributor Avia Satcom Co. An Army spokesman said that units on the ground would have discretion to continue using the GT200 unless they could find a substitute, though the Army would be sending proven alternatives such as sniffer dogs to assist the troops. Pornthip Rojanasunand of the Central Institute of Forensic Science said that although she knew it was "not scientific equipment", she believed that forensic scientists could still use it effectively: "We won't buy more, but we won't stop using them either."

Global Technical rejected the tests' conclusions. The company issued a statement saying that it was "surprised and disappointed" by the outcome of the tests. It claimed that the results were "completely at odds with other tests carried out by independent bodies" and with "the experience of the large number of users of this product all over the world."

Despite the outcome of the tests, Thai Army chief General Anupong Paojinda said that he would not order his soldiers to stop using the GT200. He insisted that "the device operators on the ground can use them effectively. This may not be explained scientifically, but I'm telling the truth." While not rejecting the result of the tests, he stood by the device's effectiveness and argued that "as the men on the ground are impressed with it and demanded the equipment, it is the duty of the commander to procure them." He rejected the use of sniffer dogs on the grounds that they could not detect explosives at a distance and were disliked by Muslims for religious reasons. The former army chief General Sonthi Boonyaratglin also argued that the purchase of the GT200 had been justified as there was demand from operational units, despite the high price of the device: "Price is not an issue if the device is able to save people's lives." Prime Minister Abhisit ordered the scientists who had conducted the tests to explain their findings to the military and ask them to stop using the device, but said that he did not want to confront the army. Some soldiers, however, were reported to have abandoned the GT200 and turned instead to using chopsticks and their own hands to detect bombs hidden on motorcycles.

In August 2012, the Thai Department of Special Investigation (DSI), which had been carrying out a review of 13 government agencies' procurement of the GT200, stated that the buyers had been deceived by the device's manufacturer. The DSI's chief, Tarit Pengdith, told a press conference that the manufacturer had "set out to lure potential buyers into buying its devices from the beginning". He said that the government agencies were now considering prosecuting the GT200's manufacturer and resellers for fraud.

As of 2018, fourteen years after the Thai military and police spent millions on bogus GT200 "bomb detectors", the National Anti-Corruption Commission (NACC) investigation is still "on-going". Surasak Keereevichien, an NACC member, stated in August 2018 that it is difficult for the anti-graft agency to ascertain whether there was any wrongdoing committed in the 1.13-billion baht purchase of fake "remote substance detectors". He said the NACC would come up with a decision on the matter "at an appropriate time. The NACC will not allow the statute of limitations to expire...." Surasak claimed that officials bought the devices despite their exorbitant price tag because they thought they would work. "Sometimes, it is not about the value of devices. It's more about belief, just like when you buy Buddha amulets," Surasak said. "Officials who used this device found it worth the price. But some people see the price as too high." When the GT200 scandal first came to light, the equipment was tested by the National Science and Technology Development Agency (NSTDA) and it found that the GT200 consisted of two pieces of plastic and lacked any electronic components, as was advertised in a brochure distributed to potential customers.

==== Alpha 6 controversy ====
In the wake of the GT200 controversy, the procurement by the Interior and Justice Ministries of the Alpha 6 "molecular detector" device has come under scrutiny. The Thailand Science and Technology Ministry announced that it would broaden its tests to verify the claimed effectiveness of the Alpha 6. The case was declared "closed" in May 2018 after 10 years of investigation. Three minor officials are deemed responsible for the purchase of 493 of the "worthless [Alpha 6] boxes" at a cost of 350 million baht. The British scammer who sold the devices to Thailand was found guilty of fraud in the UK and imprisoned in 2013. The Bangkok Post fumed that, "The disappointing and unsatisfactory outcome of this astoundingly long investigation shows up the enormous failings of the anti-graft commission."

=== Kenya ===
The use of the GT200 as a means of tracking smuggled ivory in Kenya has also been questioned. Stephen Fry, who saw the GT200 being used by Kenyan rangers in an attempt to catch poachers, described the misinformation which accompanied the devices as "cynical, cruel and monstrous." He told the BBC's Newsnight programme: "I was horrified. They had spent a vast sum of money on a modern equivalent of a hazel twig divining rod. There was no possibility that such a thing could work."

=== Mexico ===
Most of the Mexican media coverage on GT200 lacked of a critical point of view, but science populariser Martin Bonfil Olivera wrote on 17 February 2010 the first article warning about this scam. However, the impact of this article (and the next on 10 March 2010,) on the rest of the press was almost imperceptible, with only Fausto Ovalle from La-Ch.com writing about it. Only after Marc Lacey from The New York Times wrote on 15 March 2010 about the British government warning on the GT200, the scam was exposed in some Mexican newspapers. Later, Juan José Morales from Por Esto! wrote a couple of columns and Bonfil Olivera was interviewed by Ana Paula Ordorica and Enrique Acevedo for La Otra Agenda TV show. A local newspaper in Cuernavaca published about the detector in their science popularisation section in the charge of the Academy of Sciences of the State of Morelos. A few critical articles published in 2011 include two interviews by Benito Jiménez and an interview by Guillermo Cárdenas.

All of this had been not enough to create public awareness on this subject. Main press and TV continued not just ignoring the subject but even justifying it. Mexican military continues doing searches and explosives are ruled out based on GT200 results. This situation might have changed the publication by a major newspaper, El Universal, of a critical article in its first page. Subsequent articles were published daily for a week in the main and editorial pages of that newspaper, and interviews with scientists and human rights defenders were transmitted in television and radio channels.

According to data available in Federal Institute of Access to Public Information (IFAI) and press notes, the GT200 has been bought among others by the SEDENA, SEMAR, some PEMEX filials and some state police agencies. As of 2011, more than MXN$340 million Mexican pesos (US$26 million US dollars (at 2011-09-16 rate)) have been spent to purchase more than 940 detectors.

On 13 September 2011, a group of scientists, including members of the Science Council of the Presidency and the president of the Mexican Academy of Science, met members of the Science Committee of the Senate to discuss the GT200. The scientists argued that the claimed scientific basis for the operation of the GT200 was false and that the device was unlikely to work, they pointed out the risks to the armed forces and to the civilian population from the continued use of the "detector", and that notwithstanding the apparent number of favourable testimonies, the devices had to be subjected to controlled double blind tests. The senators announced they would present a resolution to the main assembly of the Senate in order to audit the armed forces and demand a scientific test of their equipment.

On 3 October 2011, Karla Macías Lovera, a judge in the state of Veracruz, took a historic decision, ordering the release of Ernesto Cayetano Aguilar, a man that had been accused of carrying drugs eight months back, when he was singled out by the GT200 from among the passengers of a bus where a kilogramme of marijuana was found. The judge argued that the GT200 provided no credible evidence, as there is no scientific proof that it actually works.

On 21 October 2011, double blind tests were finally performed in México to assess the efficacy of the GT200 detector. The results of this test were to be presented as a proof in an ongoing judicial process. Although the judge has not yet resolved the case (October 2012), El Universal, a major Mexican newspaper, published a detailed account of the results. The test was conducted by two physicists, members of the Mexican Academy of Science, and several military men and policemen participated, including two certified expert operators of the GT200. More than 1600 amphetamine capsules and four bullets were hidden in one of eight cardboard boxes distributed on a large abandoned ballroom. In a first stage the substances were hidden in plain view of all the participants and the GT200 was 100% successful (four successes in four tries). However, the second stage was double blind, and only three searches succeeded out of twenty tries, a result consistent with chance but not with any useful effectiveness. Thus, it was demonstrated that the GT200 yields reliable results only when the operator knows beforehand where the substance is hidden, but is otherwise useless.

The El Paso Times reported on 24 October 2011 that the Mexican army turned down an offer from the Mexican Association for the Sciences to help test the effectiveness of the GT200. In a written response, the Mexican army stated that their contract with the GT200 supplier prevents them from accepting the offer.

On 5 June 2012 the Mexican Congress approved a declaration exhorting the President to collect from the scientific community and to analyze all opinions and evidence on the effectiveness of the GT200 as a molecular detector, with the help of his Science Council. It may be interesting to note that to this date (Aug.9, 2012), after five and a half years of his presidency, president Calderón had never met with his Science Council.

On 29 August 2012, the Supreme Court of Justice announced that it would review a case involving the GT200. It seems that two young men were accused of dealing with cocaine. The judge disregarded the case stating that there was no scientific evidence proving the usefulness of the GT200. The Attorney General appealed this decision and the Supreme Court stepped in.

On 22 December 2012, a newspaper announced that the new Attorney General (Procurador General de la República) had prohibited its use by the police forces under his command, as the GT200 had failed scientific tests, and that their purchase was being investigated.

== See also ==
- List of topics characterized as pseudoscience
- Sniffex
