= List of vice-chancellors of the University of Dhaka =

University of Dhaka, also known as Dhaka University, is the oldest university in Bangladesh. It was established in 1921. Since its establishment, 27 academic scholars and educationalist have taken responsibility of the University of Dhaka as the vice chancellor. ASM Maksud Kamal, was the 29th vice chancellor of University of Dhaka. On 26 August 2024, Niaz Ahmed Khan was appointed as the 30th vice chancellor of University of Dhaka after ASM Maksud Kamal resigned.

In March 2026, following the resignation of Niaz Ahmed Khan, Professor ABM Obaidul Islam assumed office as the Vice Chancellor.

First Indian Muslim vice chancellor of this university was Sir Ahmad Fazlur Rahman. After him a famous historian R. C. Majumdar took over the responsibility. Sayed Moazzem Hossain was the first student of Dhaka University to become the vice chancellor.

In March 1971, Justice Abu Sayeed Chowdhury was the vice chancellor but he was in Geneva at that time to attend the UN Human Rights Commission summit. He became fed up seeing news in a newspaper about the death of two students of Dhaka University. He resigned from his duties sending a letter to the educational secretary of East Pakistan via the Pakistan Embassy. In that letter he wrote, "I don't find it logical to act as the vice chancellor while my unarmed students were killed. So, I resigned." The Mujibnagar government then assigned Justice Sayeed as the “Special representative of the expatriate government”. On 19 July, the military forces of Pakistan made Syed Sajjad Hussain the vice chancellor of Dhaka University who was the vice chancellor of Rajshahi University. Hasan Zaman & Meher Ali assisted him.

== List of vice chancellors ==
| Sequence | Picture | Name | Took over | Transfer the responsibility |
|---|---|---|---|---|
| 1 | | Sir Philip Hartog | 1920-12-01 | 1925-12-31 |
| 2 | | George Harry Langley | 1926-01-26 | 1934-06-30 |
| 3 | | Sir Ahmad Fazlur Rahman | 1934-07-01 | 1936-12-31 |
| 4 | | R. C. Majumdar | 1937-01-01 | 1942-06-30 |
| 5 | | Mahmud Hassan | 1942-07-01 | 1948-10-21 |
| 6 | | Sayed Moazzem Hossain | 1948-10-22 | 1953-11-08 |
| 7 | | Walter Allen Jenkins | 1953-11-09 | 1956-11-08 |
| 8 | | Muhammad Ibrahim | 1956-11-09 | 1958-10-27 |
| 9 | | Judge Hamoodur Rahman | 1958-11-05 | 1960-12-14 |
| 10 | | Mahmud Hussain | 1960-12-15 | 1963-02-19 |
| 11 | | M Osman Ghani | 1963-02-20 | 1969-12-01 |
| 12 | | Justice Abu Sayeed Chowdhury | 1969-12-02 | 1971-03-02 |
| 13 | | Syed Sajjad Hussain | 1971-07-19 | 1972-01-20 |
| 14 | | Muzaffar Ahmed Chowdhury | 1972-01-21 | 1973-04-12 |
| 15 | | Abdul Matin Chowdhury | 1973-04-13 | 1975-09-22 |
| 16 | | Muhammad Shamsul Huq | 1975-09-23 | 1976-02-01 |
| 17 | | Fazlul Halim Chowdhury | 1976-02-02 | 1983-03-20 |
| 18 | | A K M Siddiq | 1983-03-21 | 1983-08-16 |
| 19 | | M. Shamshul Haque | 1983-08-17 | 1986-01-12 |
| 20 | | Abdul Mannan | 1986-01-12 | 1990-03-22 |
| 21 | | Mohammad Moniruzzaman Miah | 1990-03-24 | 1992-10-31 |
| 22 | | Emajuddin Ahamed | 1992-11-01 | 1996-08-31 |
| 23 | | Shahid Uddin Ahmed | 1996-08-31 | 1996-09-29 |
| 24 | | Abul Kalam Azad Chowdhury | 1996-09-30 | 2001-11-11 |
| 25 | | Anwarullah Chowdhury | 2001-11-12 | 2002-07-31 |
| 26 | | A F M Yusuf Haider (acting vice chancellor) | 2002-08-01 | 2002-09-09 |
| 27 | | Syed Muhammed Abul Faiz | 2002-09-09 | 2009-01-15 |
| 28 | | AAMS Arefin Siddique | 2009-01-15 | 2017-01-04 |
| 29 | | Mohammed Akhtaruzzaman | 2017-01-04 | 2023-11-02 |
| 30 | | ASM Maksud Kamal | 2023-11-04 | 2024-08-10 |
| 31 | | Niaz Ahmed Khan | 2024-08-27 | 2026-02-22 |
| 32 | | A B M Obaidul Islam | 2026-03-16 | Incumbent |

== See also ==
- History of the University of Dhaka
- Liberation War of Bangladesh
