= Nazrul Islam (professor) =

Bangladeshi academic

Chairman of University Grants Commission
- In office 7 May 2007 – 6 May 2011
- President: Iajuddin Ahmed
- Preceded by: Mohammad Asaduzzaman
- Succeeded by: A K Azad Chowdhury

Dhaka WASA
- In office 1999–2002

Personal details
- Education: University of Dhaka
- Occupation: University academic, professor, administrator

Nazrul Islam is an urban planner, chairman of the Centre for Urban Studies, and former chairman of the University Grants Commission of Bangladesh. He is the former chairman of Dhaka WASA. Prof. Nazrul Islam Urban Studio at the University of Dhaka is named after him.

== Career ==
From 1999 to 2002, Islam was the chairman of Dhaka WASA. Islam was a professor of the Department of Geography and Environment at the University of Dhaka. He taught urban development planning at the Asian Institute of Technology. He served on the advisory committee on Urban Planning and Architecture at the Ministry of Housing and Public Works.

Islam was the chairman of the University Grants Commission of Bangladesh from 7 May 2007 to 6 May 2011. He called for including quotas at universities for disabled students. He proposed developing a 10 billion taka fund for private universities. He ordered an investigation of corruption and mismanagement at Bangabandhu Sheikh Mujib Medical University. In 2009, he urged private universities to reduce their tuition. In 2015, he opposed the imposition of VAT on private universities. In May 2011, Dr. A K Azad Chowdhury succeeded him as chairman of the University Grants Commission of Bangladesh.

Islam worked with Sheltech to build a residential building called Sheltech Shamatata in 2023. He is the chairman of the Centre for Urban Studies.

In May 2025, an attempted murder case was filed against Islam over a student of Alia Madrasa getting injured in Old Dhaka during protests against former Prime Minister Sheikh Hasina in August 2024.
