= Asiatic Society of Bangladesh =

Non-profit research organisation in Bangladesh

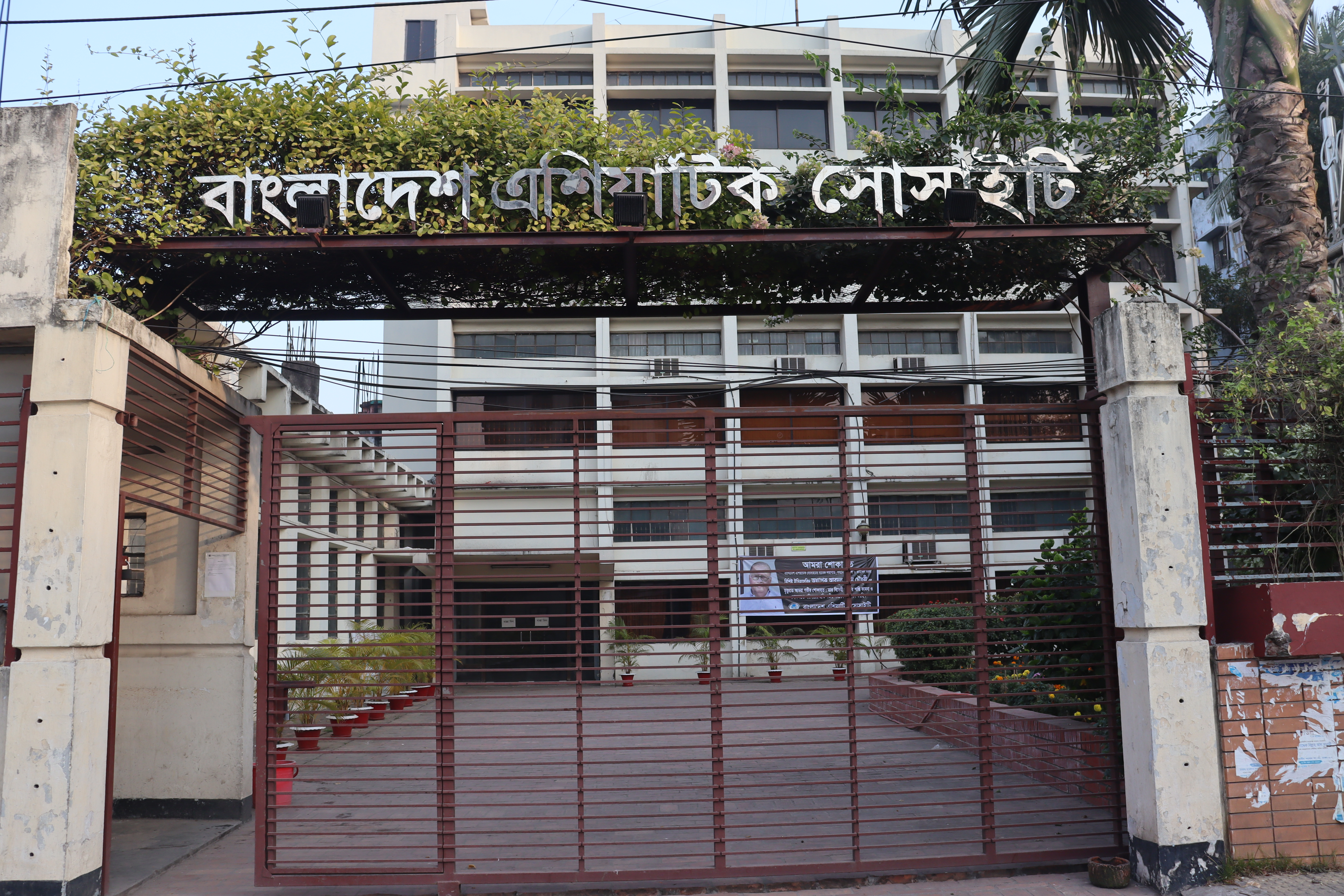
- The headquarters of Asiatic Society of Bangladesh at Nimtali, Dhaka, Bangladesh
- Formation: 1952; 74 years ago
- Location: 5, Old Secretariat Road, Nimtali, Dhaka, Bangladesh
- Coordinates: 23.724076°N 90.402586°E
- President: Harun-or-Rashid
- Website: www.asiaticsociety.org.bd

The Asiatic Society of Bangladesh is a non political and non profit research organisation registered under both Society Act of 1864 and NGO Affairs Bureau, Government of Bangladesh. The Asiatic Society of Bangladesh was established as the Asiatic Society of East Pakistan in Dhaka in 1952 by a number of Muslim leaders, and renamed in 1972. Ahmed Hasan Dani, a noted Muslim historian and archaeologist of Pakistan played an important role in founding this society. He was assisted by Muhammad Shahidullah, a Bengali linguist. The society is housed in Nimtali, walking distance from the Curzon Hall of Dhaka University, locality of Old Dhaka.

== History ==
Asiatic Society of Bangladesh traces its origins to The Asiatic Society, which was founded by Sir William Jones in 1784. Some of scholars of the Asiatic Society moved to Dhaka, capital of East Bengal, after the Partition of India. Ahmad Hasan Dani, professor of history at the University of Dhaka, proposed the idea of establishing a Asiatic Society in Dhaka which was widely appreciated by scholars in Dhaka.

Asiatic Society of Pakistan was established on 3 January 1952 by Ahmad Hasan Dani, Abu Mohammed Habibullah, Abdul Halim, Abdul Hamid, Itrat Husain Zuberi, J. S. Turner, Khan Bahadur Abdur Rahman Khan, Muhammad Shahidullah, Sayed Moazzem Hossain, Serajul Huq, Sheikh Sharafuddin, Syed Muhammed Taifoor, and W. H. A. Sadani. The society modeled after The Asiatic Society in Kolkata is managed by a 17 member executive committee which has a two year term.

In September 2013, the Asiatic Society of Bangladesh published a junior version of Banglapedia.

The Asiatic Society of Bangladesh in November 2020 cancelled the grant of two professors at the University of Dhaka after it found evidence of plagiarism in their work.

== Museum ==
The Asiatic Society Heritage Museum is located in Old Dhaka.

== Publications ==
The society's publications include:

- Banglapedia, the National Encyclopedia of Bangladesh (edition 2, 2012)
- Encyclopedia of Flora and Fauna of Bangladesh (2010, 28 volumes)
- Cultural Survey of Bangladesh, a documentation of the country's cultural history, tradition and heritage (2008, 12 volumes)
- Children's Banglapedia, a three-volume version of Banglapedia for children
- History of Bangladesh (1704-1971) (3 volumes)
- National Online Biography; Digital publication of the Survey and Settlement Reports (1896-1927)
- Parliamentary Documents and History
- Digest of the reports and surveys on the mineral resources in Bangladesh
- Journal of the Asiatic Society of Bangladesh (Humanities)
- Journal of the Asiatic Society of Bangladesh (Sciences)
- Asiatic Society Patrika

== List of presidents and general secretaries ==
| President | General secretary | Term | Reference |
|---|---|---|---|
| Abdul Hamid | Ahmad Hasan Dani | 1952-1953 | |
| Muhammad Shahidullah | Serajul Huq | 1954 | |
| Abdul Halim | Serajul Huq | 1955 | |
| Muhammad Ibrahim | Ahmad Hasan Dani | 1956 | |
| Khan Bahadur Abdur Rahman Khan | Ahmad Hasan Dani | 1957-1958 | |
| Khan Bahadur Abdur Rahman Khan | M Saghir Hasan | 1959 | |
| Abdul Halim | Ahmad Hasan Dani | 1960-1961 | |
| Muhammad Shahidullah | Mafizullah Kabir | 1962 | |
| Muhammad Shahidullah | Syed Sajjad Hussain | 1963-1964 | |
| Muhammad Enamul Haq | Abdul Karim | 1965 | |
| Muhammad Enamul Haq | Mafizullah Kabir | 1966 | |
| Muhammad Shahidullah | Syed Murtaza Ali | 1967 | |
| Abdul Maudud | Abu Mohammed Habibullah | 1968 | |
| Abu Mohammed Habibullah | Ahmed Sharif | 1969-1973 | |
| Syed Murtaza Ali | Ajoy Kumar Roy | 1974 | |
| Abu Mohammed Habibullah | Ajoy Kumar Roy | 1975 | |
| Kamruddin Ahmed | Mohammad Moniruzzaman Miah | 1976 | |
| Kamruddin Ahmed | Momtazur Rahman Tarafdar | 1977-1978 | |
| Serajul Huq | Momtazur Rahman Tarafdar | 1979 | |
| Muhammad Enamul Haq | Momtazur Rahman Tarafdar | 1980 | |
| Khan Bahadur Abdul Hakim | Sirajul Islam | 1981 | |
| Mafizullah Kabir | Sirajul Islam | 1982 | |
| A R Mallick | K. M. Mohsin | 1983 | |
| A R Mallick | Mohammad Moniruzzaman | 1984-1985 | |
| Abul Kalam Mohammed Zakaria | Sirajul Islam | 1986-1987 | |
| A. M. Sharafuddin | Wakil Ahmed | 1988-1989 | |
| A. M. Sharafuddin | Syed Anwar Husain | 1990-1991 | |
| AKM Nurul Islam | Hasna Begum | 1992-1993 | |
| Sirajul Islam | Harun-or-Rashid | 1994-1995 | |
| Wakil Ahmed | Akmal Hussain | 1996-1997 | |
| M Harunur Rashid | Sajahan Miah | 1998-1999 | |
| Abdul Momin Chowdhury | Sajahan Miah | 2000-2001 | |
| Abdul Momin Chowdhury | Syed Rashidul Hasan | 2002-2003 | |
| Emajuddin Ahamed | S. M. Mahfuzur Rahman | 2004-2005 | |
| Emajuddin Ahamed | Sajahan Miah | 2006-2007 | |
| Sirajul Islam | Mahfuza Khanam | 2008-2009 | |
| Sirajul Islam | Mahfuza Khanam | 2010-2011 | |
| Nazrul Islam | Ahmed A. Jamal | 2012-2013 | |
| Amirul Islam Chowdhury | Ahmed A. Jamal | 2012-2013 | |
| Amirul Islam Chowdhury | Ahmed A. Jamal | 2014-2015 | |
| Amirul Islam Chowdhury | A. K. M. Golam Rabbani | 2016-2017 | |
| Mahfuza Khanam | Sabbir Ahmed | 2018-2019 | |
| Mahfuza Khanam | Sabbir Ahmed | 2020-2021 | |
| Khondoker Bazlul Hoque | Mohammad Siddiqur Rahman Khan | 2022-2023 | |

== See also ==
- Banglapedia
