= M. Shamshul Haque =

Bangladeshi academic

- মো: শামসুল হক

19th Vice-Chancellor of the University of Dhaka
- In office 17 August 1983 – 12 January 1986
- Preceded by: A K M Siddiq
- Succeeded by: Abdul Mannan

Adviser to the caretaker government
- In office 3 April 1996 – 23 June 1996

M. Shamshul Haque was an academic from Bangladesh who was the 19th Vice Chancellor of Dhaka University and an advisor to the Caretaker government of Bangladesh in 1996.

== Career ==
Haque was the 19th Vice Chancellor of Dhaka University. He was an advisor to the caretaker government's Ministry of Education, Youth and Sports and Culture from 3 April 1996 to 23 June 1996.
