= Mohammed Akhtaruzzaman (historian) =

Professor and 28th Vice Chancellor of University of Dhaka

Md. Akhtaruzzaman
- মো. আখতারুজ্জামান
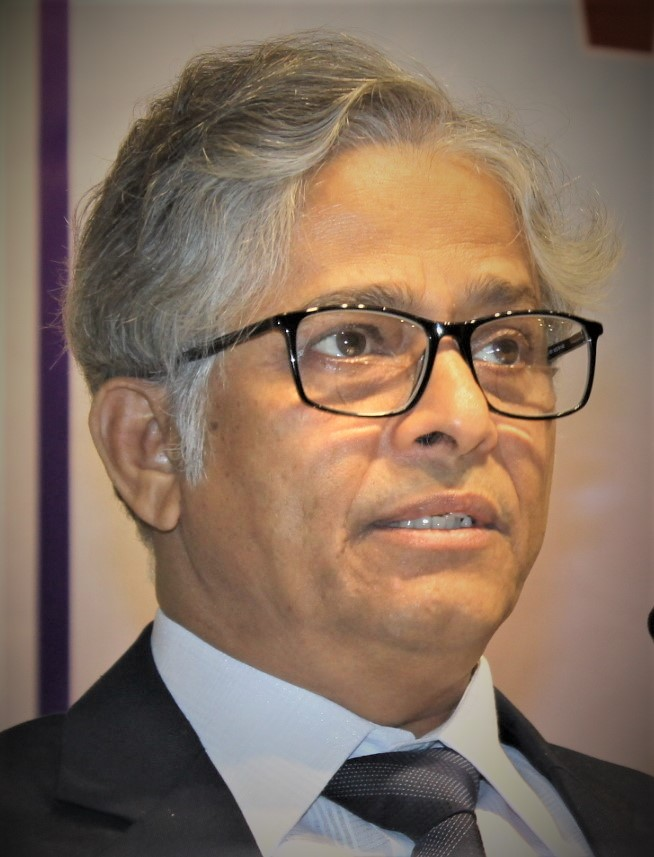
- Professor Akhtaruzzaman in 2018

28th Vice-Chancellor of the University of Dhaka
- In office 6 September 2017 – 2 November 2023
- Chancellor: Abdul Hamid; Mohammed Shahabuddin
- Preceded by: A. A. M. S. Arefin Siddique
- Succeeded by: ASM Maksud Kamal

Personal details
- Born: Barguna District, Bangladesh
- Education: Ph.D.
- Alma mater: University of Dhaka; Aligarh Muslim University

Md. Akhtaruzzaman (born 1 July 1964) is a Bangladeshi academic who served as the 28th vice-chancellor of the University of Dhaka. Prior to this position, he served in different academic, administrative and co-curricular development activities at the University of Dhaka including the pro-vice chancellor (administration), dean (Faculty of Arts), chairman, Department of Islamic History & Culture, and provost of the Kabi Jashim Uddin Hall, University of Dhaka.

== Early life and education ==
Akhtaruzzaman, the second son of Eron Banu and Abul Hashem Khan, was born in Kalipur, Patharghata Upazila, Barguna District. He earned Ph.D. in history from Aligarh Muslim University in 1997. He was a Fulbright Scholar at Boston College. He has a post-graduate diploma in Persian language, and completed Bachelors and Masters in Islamic History & Culture from the University of Dhaka.

== Career ==
Akhtaruzzaman joined the University of Dhaka as a lecturer in 1990. He was promoted to professor in 2004. From 2004 to 2016, he was the dean of the Faculty of Arts at the University of Dhaka. From 2004 to 2006, he was the General Secretary of the Dhaka University Teachers’ Association. From 2008 to 2011, he was the chairman of the Department of Islamic History and Culture at the University of Dhaka. He was the provost of Kabi Jashimuddin Hall of University of Dhaka from 2007 to 2013. From 2007 to 2009, he was the general secretary of Aligarh Old Boys’ Association of Bangladesh.

Akhtaruzzaman led the National Committee for Textbook Crisis Resolution formed by the Government of Bangladesh in 2009 as convener. This committee recommended for free distribution of textbooks for students up to class ten, and suggested reforms in printing and supplying textbooks.

Akhtaruzzaman was the Convener of Textbook Printing and Distribution Oversee and Advisory Committee in 2009 and 2010, Member of National Education Policy 2010 Implementation Committee and Member, National Curriculum Coordination Committee. He has been elected as a council member of the Association of Commonwealth Universities.

From 2015 to 2016, Akhtaruzzaman was the Chairman of the Department of Arabic at the University of Dhaka. From June 2016 to September 2017, Akhtaruzzaman was the Pro-Vice Chancellor of the University of Dhaka. He was a council member of the Asiatic Society of Bangladesh. In 2016, he became the Vice-President of the Bangladesh Itihas Parishad. In 2017, he was made a presidium board member of Bangladesh-Russia Moitry Samity. In September 2017, he was appointed the Vice-Chancellor of the University of Dhaka replacing Professor AAMS Arefin Siddique. Following his appointment, 11 provost and members of the proctorial body resigned.

The official residence of Vice Chancellor of the University of Dhaka was attacked on 9 April 2018 at around 1-2:20am, and destroyed doors, windows and glasses historic furniture of the building, looted valuable belongings and historic artifacts, and burned car, households and many other materials. The attack took place while the movement for "Quota Reform" in the public service recruitment examination was happening at the University Campus. Masked attackers verbally abused and tried to attack the vice chancellor. Later, a group of students along with some teachers protested the attack and rescued the vice chancellor. There has been some controversy regarding the attack on 9 April as the Bangladesh Nationalist Party, the opposition party leader alleged that the attack was carried out to divert the quota-reform movement to different direction.

On 11 April 2018 when Prime Minister of Bangladesh Sheikh Hasina announced in the parliament that all sorts of quota will be scrapped from public service, Akhtaruzzaman also expressed solidarity with the Quota Reform Movement. However, on 8 July 2018, during the second phase of Quota Reform Protests, he compared the mode of activities of quota reform protesters with that of Islamist militant outfits, which was questioned by human rights activists and international political analysts. Following the agitations of students, Akhtaruzzaman ordered a bar on the entry of general people to Dhaka University campus which was criticized heavily by the Supreme Court Bar Association of Bangladesh.

In May 2025, an attempted murder case was filed against Akhtaruzzaman over a student of Alia Madrasa getting injured in Old Dhaka during protests against Prime Minister Sheikh Hasina in August 2024.

== Bibliography ==
Akhtaruzzaman has written 42 research articles in journals and edited books. He has authored / edited the following books.

1. Muslim Itihastattwa (Muslim Historiography / মুসলিম ইতিহাসতত্ত্ব) (Dhaka University, 2008; second edition July 2019)
2. Society and Urbanization in Medieval Bengal (Asiatic Society of Bangladesh, 2009; first reprint 2020)
3. Liberation War of Bangladesh : Background and Event (edited, 2009)
4. A Quest for Islamic Learning: Essays in Memory of Professor Serajul Haque (edited, 2011)
5. Probandha Sankolon (Anthology of Essays) (edited)
6. Islam and Moral Studies (edited, textbooks for class VI - X)
7. Bangladesh and Global Studies (edited & moderated, textbook for class IX - X)
