= Bangladesh Open University =

Public university in Bangladesh

Coordinates: 23.9517°N 90.3798°E

- বাংলাদেশ উন্মুক্ত বিশ্ববিদ্যালয়
- Seal of the Bangladesh Open University
- Type: Public
- Established: 21 October 1992; 34 years ago
- Affiliations: Commonwealth of Learning; SAARC Consortium on Open and Distance Learning (SACODiL); University Grants Commission (UGC); Asian Association of Open Universities (AAOU)
- Chancellor: President Mirza Fakhrul Islam Alamgir
- Vice-Chancellor: Siddiqur Rahman Khan
- Academic staff: 26,625 (2016)
- Students: 965,838 (Cumulative as of 15/12/2020) (formal programs)
- Location: Board Bazar, Gazipur, Dhaka Division, Bangladesh
- Campus: Main Campus, Regional Center, Subregional Center affiliated schools and colleges
- Total academic programs: 62 (includes 43 formal and 19 non-formal programs)
- Website: bou.ac.bd

The Bangladesh Open University (BOU) Bengali: বাংলাদেশ উন্মুক্ত বিশ্ববিদ্যালয় (বাউবি), established on 21 October 1992, is a public university with its main campus in Board Bazar, Gazipur District, Dhaka Division. It is the 8th largest university in the world according to enrollment.

As the only public university in Bangladesh to use distance education as a method of delivery, BOU is mandated to "promote through multimedia; instruction of every standard and knowledge – both general and scientific – by means of any form of communications technology, to raise the standard of education and to give the people educational opportunities by democratizing education and creating a class of competent people by raising the standard of education of the people generally."

== History ==
Distance education was first introduced into Bangladesh when the Education Directorate was assigned responsibility for the distribution of 200 radio receivers to educational institutions. This led to the creation of an Audio-Visual Cell and later the Audio-Visual Education Centre (AVEC) in 1962.

Upon achieving independence in 1971, mass education was viewed as a priority in the new nation. The School Broadcasting Programme (SBP) was launched in 1978. The project was later expanded to become the National Institute of Educational Media and Technology (NIEMT) in 1983. In 1985, the NIEMT was renamed the Bangladesh Institute of Distance Education (BIDE), which offered, apart from audio-visual materials, a Bachelor of Education (BEd) programme via distance learning validated by the University of Rajshahi. The success of BIDE encouraged policymakers to take up a major plan for establishing an open university.

In 1992, the plan came into fruition with the tabling and passing of the BOU Act 1992, and the prime minister was the chancellor of the Bangladesh Open University. On 22 June 2009, a bill was placed in the parliament to assign the president as chancellor, replacing the prime minister.

On 4 December 2024, the BOU and the Directorate of Youth Development under the Ministry of Youth and Sports signed a memorandum of understanding for youth empowerment.

== Administration ==
Chancellor	President Mirza Fakhrul Islam Alamgir, President of Bangladesh
Vice-Chancellor	A B M Obaidul Islam
Pro Vice-Chancellor (Administration)	Vacant
Pro Vice-Chancellor (Academic)	Sayeed Ferdous
Treasurer	Abul Hasnat Md. Shamim
Registrar	Md. Anisur Rahman

=== List of vice-chancellors ===
Sl No.	Name	Term start	Term end	Reference
1.	Shamsher Ali	21 October 1992	20 October 1996	
2.	M. Aminul Islam	20 October 1996	20 October 2000	
3.	Muhammad Qaisuddin	21 October 2000	3 December 2001	
4.	Ershadul Bari	10 December 2001	15 March 2007	
5.	M. Farid Ahmed	15 March 2007	24 January 2009	
6.	R I M Aminur Rashid	25 January 2009	24 January 2013	
7.	M A Mannan	24 March 2013	22 March 2021	
8.	Syed Humayun Akhter	30 June 2021	27 August 2024	
9.	A B M Obaidul Islam	15 September 2024	16 March 2026	

== Academics ==
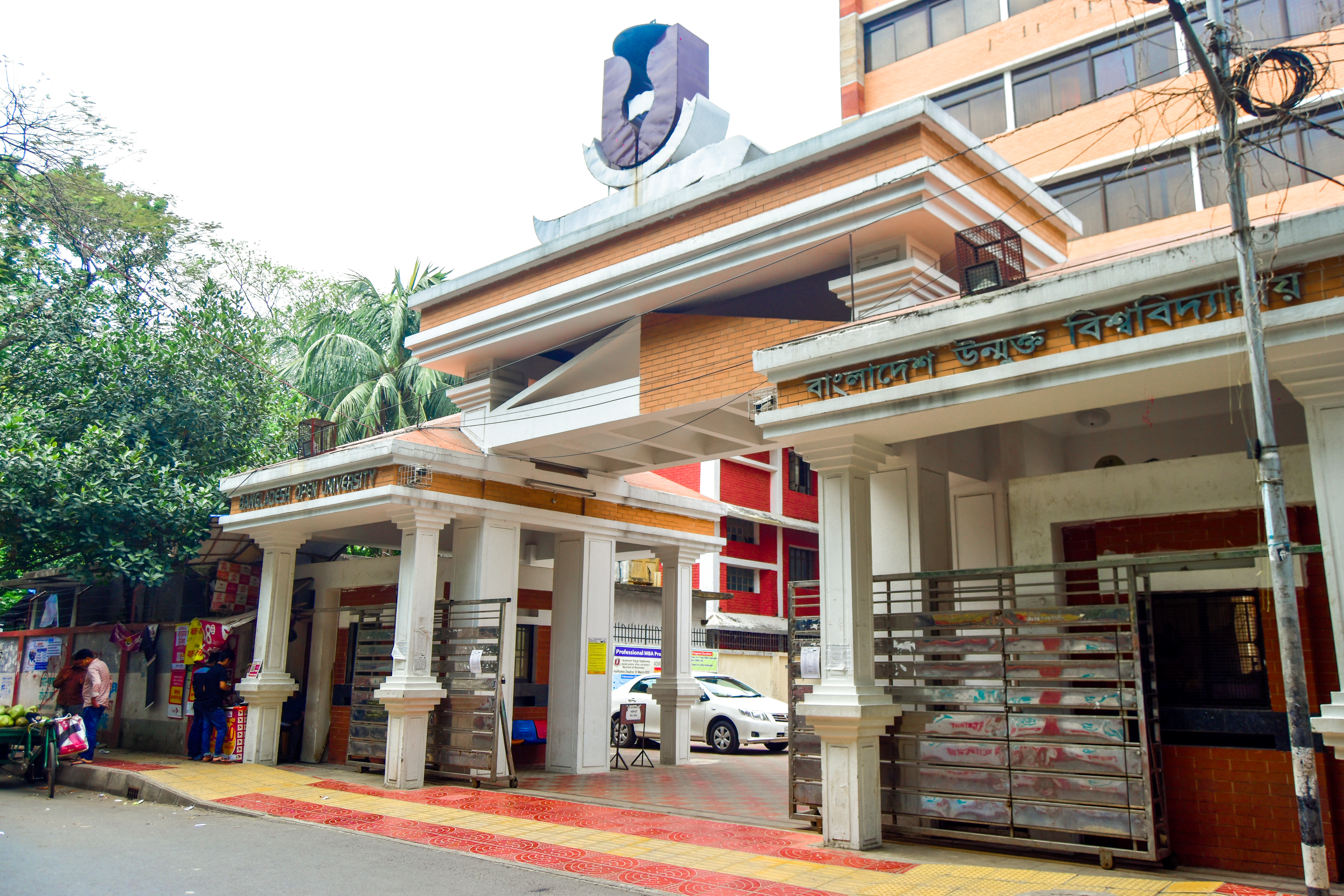
Bangladesh Open University (Dhaka Regional Center) gate

BOU offers two types of programmes, formal and non-formal, in seven schools and a network of 12 regional resource centres, 80 co-ordinating offices and 1,000 tutorial centres nationwide.

=== Study programmes ===
A total of 21 formal academic programmes are offered by BOU. Formal programmes are academic programmes that result in the awarding of an academic qualification up to a master's degree upon completion and examination.

As the low rate of literacy remains an issue in Bangladesh, non-formal programmes are conducted by the BOU to create awareness and impart knowledge about health, environment, disaster management, basic science, agriculture, food, nutrition, and other branches of knowledge for human development. To date, 19 non-formal programmes have been initiated in the areas of environmental protection, basic science, elementary mathematics, agriculture, bank services, marketing management, health, nutrition, population, and gender issues.

=== Faculties ===
BOU's 11 divisions are organized into six schools:

=== School of Education (SoE) ===
Programs offered:

- Bachelor of Education (BEd)
- Master of Education (MEd)
- Certificate in Education (CEd)

=== School of Social Science, Humanities & Languages (SSHL) ===
Programs offered:

- Master of Arts (MA)/Master of Social Science (MSS) (Preliminary)
- Master of Arts (MA)/Master of Social Science (MSS) (Final)
- Bachelor of Law (Hons) LLB (Honours)
- Bachelor of Arts (Honours)/Bachelor of Social Science (Honours) :
  - (a) Bangla,
  - (b) Political Science
  - (c) Economics
  - (d) Sociology
  - (e) English Language and Literature
  - (f) History
  - (g) Islamic History and Culture and other subjects.
- Bachelor of Arts (BA)/Bachelor of Social Science (BSS)
- Bachelor of English Language Teaching (BELT)
- Certificate in Arabic Language Proficiency (CALP)
- Certificate in English Language Proficiency (CELP)

=== School of Business (SoB) ===
Programs offered:

- Bachelor of Business Administration (BBA)
- Master of Business Administration (MBA)
- Professional Master of Business Administration (PMBA)
- Commonwealth Executive MBA (CEMBA)
- Commonwealth Executive MPA (CEMPA)
- Post Graduate Diploma in Management (PGDM)
- Certificate in Management (CIM)
- Master of Philosophy (MPhil)
- Doctor of Philosophy (Ph.D.)

=== School of Agriculture & Rural Development (SARD) ===
Programs offered:

- Bachelor of Agricultural Education (B. Ag. Ed)
- Master of Science (MS) in 7 Subjects:
  - a) MS in Agronomy
  - b) MS in Entomology
  - c) MS in Soil Science
  - d) MS in Irrigation and Water Management (IWM)
  - e) MS in Aquaculture
  - f) MS in Poultry Science
- Diploma in Youth in Development Work (DYDW)
- Certificate in Livestock & Poultry (CLP)
- Certificate in Pisciculture & Fish Processing (CPFP)

Upcoming

- Bachelor of Science (BSc.) in Agriculture
- Bachelor of Science (BSc.) in Fisheries

=== School of Science & Technology (SST) ===
Programs offered:

- Bachelor of Science in Computer Science and Engineering (B.Sc. in CSE)
- Master of Disability Management and Rehabilitation (MDMR) -for MBBS doctors
- Master of Public Health
- Post Graduate Diploma in Medical Ultrasound (PGDMU) -for MBBS doctors
- Diploma in Computer Science and Application (DCSA)

Upcoming

- Bachelor of Science in Electronics and Communication Engineering (B.Sc. in ECE)
- Bachelor of Science in Pharmacy (B.Pharm)
- Master of Science (M.Sc.) in Software Engineering (MSSE)

=== Open School ===
Programs offered:

- Master of Business Administration (MBA) in Bangla language
- Masters in Criminology and Criminal Justice
- Bachelor of Business Administration (BBA) in Bangla language
- Bachelor of Business Studies (BBS)-3 years duration
- Secondary School Certificate (SSC)
- Higher Secondary Certificate (HSC)

A full list of the regional resource centres and tutorial centres affiliated with BOU can be found on BOU's website.

=== Accreditation ===
BOU is granted the authority to confer degrees under Clause 6(c) of the BOU Act 1992. BOU is recognised as a national university by the University Grants Commission of Bangladesh, a statutory body attached to the Ministry of Education.

The BOU is a founding and participating institution of the SAARC Consortium on Open and Distance Learning (SACODiL).
