= Siddiqur Rahman Khan =

Vice-chancellor of Bangladesh Open University

Professor Dr. Siddiqur Rahman Khan

Vice-Chancellor

Bangladesh Open University
- Incumbent
- Assumed office 17 March 2026
- Preceded by: A. B. M. Obaidul Islam

Personal details
- Born: Mohammad Siddiqur Rahman Khan Hossainpur Upazila, Kishoreganj District, Bangladesh
- Spouse: Alo Arjuman Banu
- Children: 2
- Education: University of Dhaka
- Occupation: Professor, university administrator

Mohammad Siddiqur Rahman Khan is a Bangladeshi historian and academic. He is a professor in the Department of Islamic History and Culture at the University of Dhaka. He currently serves as the vice-chancellor of Bangladesh Open University (BOU). Prior to his appointment as vice-chancellor at BOU, he served as provost of Sir P. J. Hartog International Hall, dean of the Faculty of Arts, chairman of the Department of Islamic History and Culture at the University of Dhaka, and general secretary of the Asiatic Society of Bangladesh.

== Early life and education ==
Siddiqur Rahman Khan was born in Golachipa village of Hossainpur Upazila, in Kishoreganj District. His father was Abdul Aziz Khan, and his mother was Begum Halima Aziz. He obtained his B.A. (Honours) degree in 1990 and his master's degree in 1991 from the Department of Islamic History and Culture at the University of Dhaka, securing first place in both examinations. He earned a Ph.D. degree from the same university in 2013 for his research titled Politics and the Elite Class in Nawabi Bengal.

== Career ==
Siddiqur Rahman Khan began his academic career as a lecturer at BAF Shaheen College in 1995. In 1996, he joined the Department of Islamic History and Culture at the University of Dhaka as a lecturer and later became a professor in the same department. Alongside teaching and research, he has held several administrative positions, including acting proctor of the University of Dhaka, provost of Sir P. J. Hartog International Hall, chairman of the Department of Islamic History and Culture, and dean of the Faculty of Arts. He served as general secretary of the Bangladesh Itihas Parisad from 2011 to 2016. For two terms, he was the elected general secretary of the Asiatic Society of Bangladesh. He also served as managing editor of Banglapedia, the national encyclopedia of Bangladesh.

He is also a member of the Senate of the University of Dhaka, a member of the Syndicate of Southeast University, a member of the National Curriculum and Coordination Committee of the Ministry of Education, the convener of the National Committee for UNESCO's "Memory of the World" Programme, and a member of the Board of Trustees of the Bangladesh National Museum. He presented a paper on Shaheed President Ziaur Rahman's Educational Philosophy and Programme at the University of Dhaka.

On 5 July 2024, Khan issued a statement in support of the Quota Reform Movement as a leader of the White Panel, the pro-Bangladesh Nationalist Party teachers wing at the University of Dhaka. In November 2025, he presented an article on the political thoughts of the Bangladesh Nationalist Party chairperson and Prime Minister of Bangladesh Tareque Rahman. He led the University investigation team looking into the death of Shahriar Alam Shamya, an activist of the Bangladesh Jatiotabadi Chatra Dal.

On 16 March 2026, Mohammad Siddiqur Rahman Khan was appointed vice-chancellor of Bangladesh Open University and formally assumed office on 17 March 2026.

== Research and publications ==
Siddiqur Rahman Khan has served as editor of the journals Itihas, Dhaka University Faculty of Arts Journal, and The Arts Faculty Journal. More than 35 of his research articles have been published in national and international journals. He has authored and edited 15 books. His notable publications include (in Bangla):

- History of Mughal India
- History of Bangladesh, 1972–2014
- A Century of the University of Dhaka in Photographs
- The Ottoman Sultanate: Politics, Society and Culture
- University of Dhaka: A Century of Achievements in Education and Research
- The Elite Class of Nawabi Bengal: Politics, Society and Culture

== Personal life ==
His wife, Alo Arjuman Banu, is an assistant professor at University Laboratory School and College, operated by the Institute of Education and Research of the University of Dhaka. The couple have one son and one daughter.
