= Mahmud Hasan (academic) =

Bengali academic

5th Vice-Chancellor of the University of Dhaka
- In office 1 July 1942 – 21 October 1948
- Preceded by: Ramesh Chandra Majumdar
- Succeeded by: Sayed Moazzem Hossain

Personal details
- Born: 2 March 1897
- Education: Ph.D. (English)
- Alma mater: Calcutta Presidency College; Oxford University
- Occupation: Academic

Mahmood Hasan (born 2 March 1897) was an academic who served as the 5th vice-chancellor of the University of Dhaka.

== Early life and education ==
Hasan earned his bachelor's and master's in English from Presidency College, Calcutta in 1918 and 1920 respectively. He later got another master's degree and a Ph.D. degree in English from the Oxford University in 1926.

== Career ==
In 1921, Hasan started his career as a lecturer in Cotton College, Guwahati and in the same year, he was appointed as a lecturer at the University of Dhaka, as a reader in 1926 and a professor in 1936.

Hasan served as the provost of Salimullah Muslim Hall in 1928. He became the chairman of the Dhaka Education Board in 1942. Eventually, he served as the vice-chancellor of the University of Dhaka from 1 July 1942 until 21 October 1948.
