= Syed Muhammed Abul Faiz =

Bangladeshi academic

- সৈয়দ মুহাম্মদ আবদুল ফায়েজ
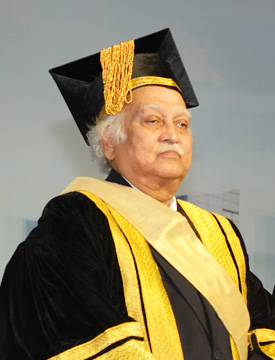
- Faiz in 2025

Chairman of University Grants Commission
- In office 5 September 2024 – 16 March 2026
- President: Mohammed Shahabuddin
- Prime Minister: Muhammad Yunus (Chief adviser)
- Preceded by: Kazi Shahidullah
- Succeeded by: Mamun Ahmed

27th Vice-Chancellor of the University of Dhaka
- In office 23 September 2002 – 16 January 2009
- Chancellor: Iajuddin Ahmed
- Preceded by: A F M Yusuf Haider
- Succeeded by: AAMS Arefin Siddique

7th Chairman of Bangladesh Public Service Commission
- In office 1 March 1993 – 5 March 1998
- President: Abdur Rahman Biswas; Shahabuddin Ahmed
- Preceded by: Iajuddin Ahmed
- Succeeded by: Md. Mustafa Chowdhury

Personal details
- Born: 25 December 1947 (age 78) 24 Parganas district, West Bengal, India
- Education: University of Dhaka; University of Aberdeen
- Occupation: university academic, professor, administrator

Syed Muhammed Abul Faiz, also known as SMA Faiz, (born 25 December 1947) is a Bangladeshi academic and was the chairman of Bangladesh University Grants Commission. He served as the 26th vice-chancellor of the University of Dhaka from September 2002 until January 2009. He was also the chairman of the Public Service Commission of Bangladesh before his tenure as the vice-chancellor.

== Early life and education ==
Faiz was born on 25 December 1947 in 24 Parganas district, West Bengal, India. He grew up in Dhaka. His father A K K Syed Muhammed Hasan Ali, was a government officer in the then East Pakistan and retired as a magistrate in Dhaka. His mother was UN Zobeda Khatun.

In 1968, Professor Faiz completed his M.S. degree in Soil Science from the University of Dhaka. In December 1970, Faiz went to the UK for doing research leading to Ph.D. and obtained the degree in Soil: Plant Water Relations from the Department of Botany, University of Aberdeen, under the supervision of Regius Professor P.E. Weatherley, Fellow of the Royal Society.

== Career ==
Faiz joined the Department of Soil Science, University of Dhaka as an assistant professor on 2 July 1973 and became an associate professor in 1977.

Faiz worked as reader (British equivalent to associate professor) in the University of Maidugari, Nigeria for about 4 years before becoming a professor in the Department of Soil Science, Dhaka University in 1986. He served as the chairman of the Department of Soil Science (now Department of Soil, Water and Environment) during 1988 to 1991, and also worked as the elected Dean of the Faculty of Biological Sciences, Dhaka University during 1991 to 1993.

Faiz was an elected member of Dhaka University Senate and Syndicate. He was the provost of Hazi Md. Mohsin Hall for few years. He writes about the higher education sector regularly now.

Faiz retired from his services at the University of Dhaka in 2014. At present, he is associated with a private university named State University of Bangladesh. He joined Haileybury Bhaluka, a private school with USD 34,500 annual fee, as an advisor.

== Dhaka University ==
In 1998 and in 2002 Professor Faiz became the 26th vice-chancellor of the University of Dhaka. The 2002 Police raid Shamsunnahar Hall took place under his watch. The treasurer of the University of Dhaka Syed Rashidul Hasan dissented against Faiz appointing three leaders of the Jatiyatabadi Chhatra Dal, student wing of the ruling Bangladesh Nationalist Party, as section officers of the university. Professors at the University demanded Faiz remove Hasanuzzaman Chowdhury, member of the Public Service Commission, from staff quarters accusing of behaving poorly with his neighbors in 2005. Chowhdury had been assaulted by drivers of the Public Service Commission whom he had accused of leaking question papers in a report to the chairman of the commission Z N Tahmida Begum who was also unhappy as it portrayed her unfavorably. In February 2008, the campus saw clashes between students supporting and against quota in the Bangladesh Civil Service. In 2006, Professor Aftab Ahmed was murdered in the official teachers residence of the university.

Faiz met with four teachers of the University detained in 2008 under the Emergency Power Rules, 2007. He met with Chief Adviser Fakhruddin Ahmed, Army Chief General Moeen U Ahmed, various advisors and chiefs of intelligence agencies. Teachers of Arabic Department protested appointing three teachers to the department who studied university and madrassah simultaneously which they alleged was illegal. Faiz said according to the attorney general there was no legal issue. He received an Independence Award on behalf of Dr Gobinda Chandra Dev.

On 27 May 2008, Faiz's term as vice chancellor which expected to end on 30 May was extended. M. Anwar Hossain, general secretary of the Dhaka University Teachers' Association, expressed displeasure at the decision which is blamed on the government fearing a conflict between Blue Panel, pro-Awami League teachers, and White Panel, Bangladesh Nationalist Party backed teachers, over the appointed of a new vice chancellor. In August, his office was vandalized by Bangladesh Chhatra League activists protesting the arrest of their general secretary. He was released along with the president of the university unit of Bangladesh Jatiyatabadi Chhatra Dal following protests. In October 2008, his office was vandalized by madrassah students who were demanding rules for admission be relaxed for them. The Bangladesh Nationalist Party supported white panel backed the madrassah students. He decided to appoint psychologists to dorms of the university following 11 suicides of students in five years. He formed a committee to investigate three teachers of the department of political science accused of leaking question papers. He resigned on 12 January 2009. He was replaced by AAMS Arefin Siddique.

== University Grants Commission ==
In 1993, Faiz was appointed chairman of the Bangladesh Public Service Commission by the president of the country. The constitutional position he held in this quasi-judicial body during 1993 to 1998 gave him the responsibility of selecting suitable candidates for different Civil Service Cadres of the Government. On 5 September 2024, Faiz was appointed chairman of the University Grants Commission. He resigned from the post on 16 March 2026 citing illness.
