= Abd al-Mannan =

ʻAbd al-Mannān (ALA-LC romanization of Arabic: عبد المنّان) is a masculine given name and surname of Arabic origin. It is built from the Arabic words ʻabd meaning 'servant', and al-Mannān 'benefactor, the giver of all bood/benefits'; the full name means 'servant of the benevolent/benefactor', 'servant of the giver of all good/benefits', and is a Muslim theophoric name.

== Given name ==
- Abdul Manan Ismail (1948–2018), Malaysian politician
- Abdul Manan Niazi (1968–2021), Afghan politician
- Abdul Manan Omari, Afghan Taliban leader
- Abdul Mannan (academic) (1932–2007), Bangladeshi academic, 19th Vice-Chancellor of the University of Dhaka
- Abdul Mannan (aviation executive) (1942–2020), Bangladeshi politician and minister from Dhaka
- Abdul Mannan (Bangladeshi politician, born 1952) (born 1952), Bangladeshi politician from Jhenaidah
- Abdul Mannan (Bir Protik) (1935–2021), Bangladeshi army veteran
- Abdul Mannan (cricketer) (born 1988), Pakistani cricketer
- Abdul Mannan (Chandpur politician) (1935–2006), Bangladeshi religious and political leader from Comilla
- Abdul Mannan (educator), Bangladeshi academic and university administrator, former vice-chancellor of Chittagong University
- Abdul Mannan (politician, born 1929) (1929–2005), Bangladeshi politician and minister of Home Affairs from Tangail
- Abdul Mannan (politician, born 1942) (born 1942), Bangladeshi politician of Bikalpa Dhara party from Laxmipur
- Abdul Mannan (politician, born 1944) (born 1944), also Professor Abdul Mannan, Bangladeshi politician from Meherpur and television personality
- Abdul Mannan (politician, born 1953) (1953–2020), Bangladeshi politician from Bogra
- Abdul Mannan (Rajshahi politician) (1936/37–1986), Bangladeshi politician
- Abdul Mannan (West Bengal politician) (born 1952), Indian National Congress politician
- Abdul Mannan Bhuiyan (1943–2010), Bangladeshi politician of Bangladesh Nationalist Party from Narsingdi
- Abdul Mannan Choudhury (born 1948), Bangladeshi academic, founder and vice-chancellor of World University of Bangladesh
- Abdul Mannan Chowdhury (politician), Bangladeshi politician
- Abdul Mannan Hossain (1952–2017), Indian politician
- Abdul Mannan Howlader (died 2015), Bangladeshi politician
- Abdul Manan Ismail (1948–2018), Malaysian politician
- Abdul Mannan Khan (1952–2026), Bangladeshi politician from Dhaka and the former State Minister of Housing and Public Works
- Abdul Mannan Mandal (1953–2018), Bangladeshi politician
- Abdul Mannan Siddique (died 2000), Bangladeshi army major
- Abdul Mannan Sikder, Bangladeshi politician
- Abdul Mannan Syed (1943–2010), Bangladeshi poet and author
- Abdul Mannan Talukder (1936–2025), Bangladeshi politician from Sirajganj
- Abdul Mannan Wazirabadi (1851–1916), Punjabi religious scholar

== Surname ==
- Abu Bakr II ibn ʽAbd al-Munan (died 1852), emir of Harar (Ethiopia)
- Eddy Helmi Abdul Manan (born 1979), Malaysian footballer
- M. A. Mannan (1950–2022), Bangladeshi politician and former mayor of Gazipur City
- M. A. Mannan (neurologist) (1932–2016), Bangladeshi educator, neurologist and politician of Awami League from Kishoreganj
- Muhammad Abdul Mannan (born 1946), Bangladeshi politician from Sunamganj and the incumbent minister of Planning
- Sheikh Abdul Mannan (died 1971), Bangladeshi journalist
- Md. Abdul Mannan (politician) (born 1959)
