= Hasna Begum =

Bangladeshi philosopher and feminist (1935–2020)

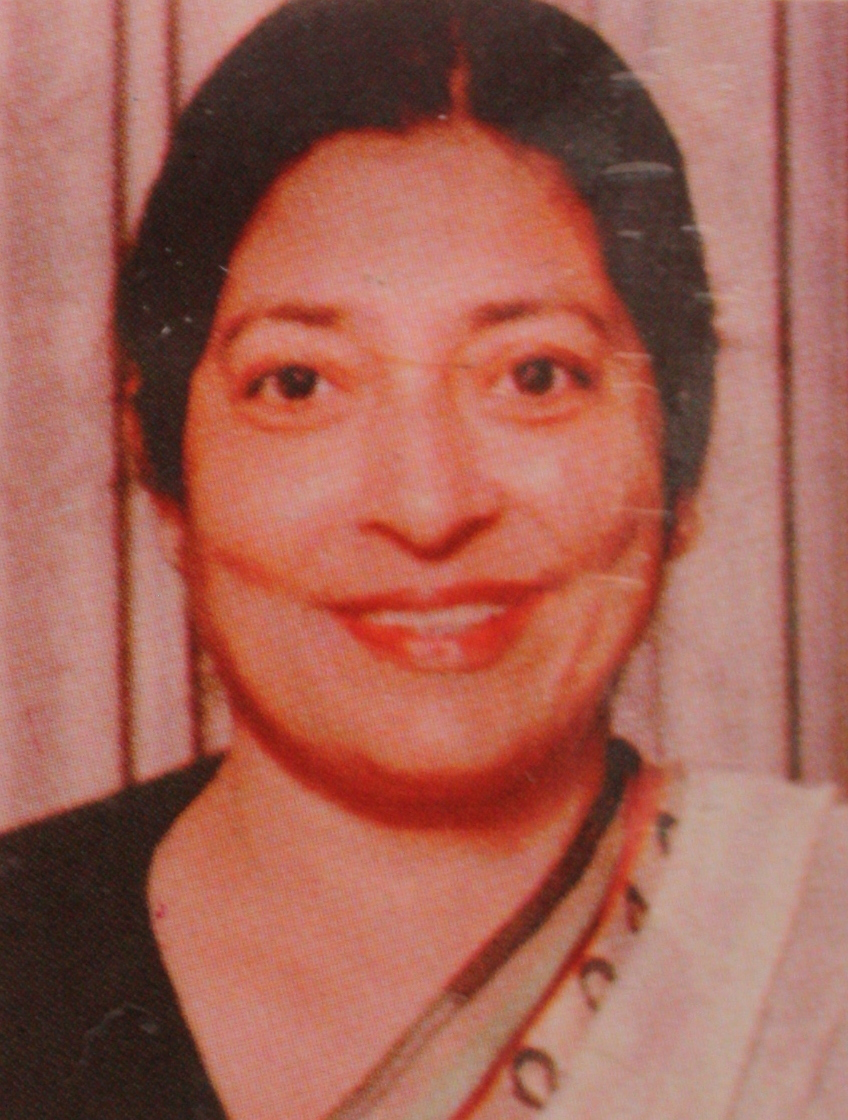
- Born: 24 February 1935; Dhaka, Bengal Presidency
- Died: 1 December 2020 (aged 85); Dhaka, Bangladesh

Education
- Education: BA (1968), University of Dhaka; MA (1969), University of Dhaka; PhD (1978), Monash University

Philosophical work
- Era: Contemporary philosophy
- School: Analytic philosophy · Utilitarianism
- Main interests: Ethics · Bioethics · Feminism

Hasna Begum (Bengali: হাসনা বেগম; 24 February 1935 – 1 December 2020) was a Bangladeshi philosopher and feminist, and a professor of philosophy at the University of Dhaka until her retirement in December 2000.

== Education and career ==
She earned her BA (1968) and MA (1969) from the University of Dhaka and her PhD (1978) in moral philosophy from Monash University, where she was the first doctoral advisee of Australian philosopher Peter Singer. The title of her doctoral dissertation was Moore's Ethics: Theory and Practice. Begum was a prolific author, and translated a number of philosophical classics into Bengali.

Begum served as chair of the Department of Philosophy at the University of Dhaka from 1991 to 1994 and was appointed to the University Grants Commission (UGC) of Bangladesh's Rokeya Chair in 2010. She was a board member of the International Association of Bioethics (IAB) from 1997 to 2005, was a member of the editorial board of Bioethics, and was a member of the editorial board of the Eubios Journal of Asian and International Bioethics (EJAIB).

== Death ==
Begum died from COVID-19 at a hospital in Dhaka, on 1 December 2020, during the COVID-19 pandemic in Bangladesh. She was 85.

== Books ==
- 3 Books of Poems, a collection of poems published in Poetry Monash between 1975 and 1978.
- Moore's Ethics: Theory and Practice, Dhaka University, Dhaka, 1982.
- G. E. Moore's Principia Ethica, translation in Bengali, Bangla Academy, Dhaka, 1985.
- J. S. Mill's Utilitarianism, translation in Bengali, Bangla Academy, Dhaka, 1985 and 2nd edition 1997, 3rd edition, 4th edition; Indian 1st edition 2016, Kolkata; 5th edition, Dhaka, 2017.
- Rupe Arupe Madonna (Bengali), Dhaka, 1986.
- Morality, Women and Society, a compilation of articles (Bengali), Bangla Academy, Dhaka, 1990.
- Women in the Developing World: Thoughts and Ideals, a compilation of articles, Sterling Publishers, New Delhi, India, 1990; 2nd edition, Dhaka, 2009. ISBN 978-8120712683
- Madonna Echoes and Vibrations, Academic Publishers, Dhaka, 1996.
- Ethics in Social Practice, Academia Publishers, Dhaka, 2001; 2nd edition, Dhaka 2010.
- Women and Other Issues (Bengali), Hakkani, Dhaka, 2002.
- Nicomachean Ethics, translation in Bengali, Dhaka University, 2006.
- Meyer Katha Mayer Katha Meyeder Katha (Bengali), February 2008, Dhaka.
- On Old Age and Others, February 2008, Dhaka.
- Madhabeer Katha, a novel (Bengali), Dhaka, 2009.
- Windows into Living, Academic Publishers, 2011. ISBN 978-9840802708
- Begum Rokeya the Feminist: Thoughts and Ideals, Dhaka, 2011.
- Amar Sonar Harin Chai (After the Golden Deer; Bengali), Memoirs. vol. 1, 2015.
- Darshaniker Galpa (Stories of Philosophers; Bengali), vol. 1, Dhaka, 2016.
