= Mohammad Mustafa Chowdhury =

Bangladeshi academic

- Born: January 24, 1940
- Died: September 12, 2014 (aged 74)
- Education: University of Dhaka

Mohammad Mustafa Chowdhury (born January 24, 1940) (Bengali: মোহাম্মদ মোস্তফা চৌধুরী) was a Bangladeshi academic and former chairman of the Bangladesh Public Service Commission. He is a professor of political science at the University of Dhaka.

== Early life ==
Chowdhury was born on January 24, 1940, in the Feni district of Bangladesh. He was married to Nure Afza Chowdhury, and they had two sons and a daughter.

== Career ==
Chowdhury began his teaching career in 1966 as a lecturer in the Department of Political Science at the University of Dhaka and later became the head of the department. He retired from teaching in 2006. Chowdhury was the former president of the Dhaka University Teachers Association and the Federation of Bangladesh University Teachers Association.

He was appointed as the 8th chairman of the Bangladesh Public Service Commission (PSC) by the president of Bangladesh on 25 March 1998, succeeding Syed Muhammed Abul Faiz. He held this position until 23 January 2002, when Z. N. Tahmida Begum succeeded him.

In February 2012, Chowdhury was acquitted in a case filed over illegal recruitment in 2002 by the Anti-Corruption Bureau. The case alleged he had recruited three with fake freedom fighter certificates and one tribal candidate with fake accreditations. The court found the freedom fighter certificates to be legitimate but the tribal was fake. The tribal recruit was sentenced to 17 years imprisonment.

== Death ==
Chowdhury died on 12 September 2014 in Toronto, Canada. In a message of condolence, Prime Minister Sheikh Hasina paid tribute to Chowdhury's significant contributions and dedicated service as a professor of political science.
