= ASM Maksud Kamal =

Professor and 29th Vice-Chancellor of University of Dhaka

A. S. M Maksud Kamal
- আ স ম মাকসুদ কামাল
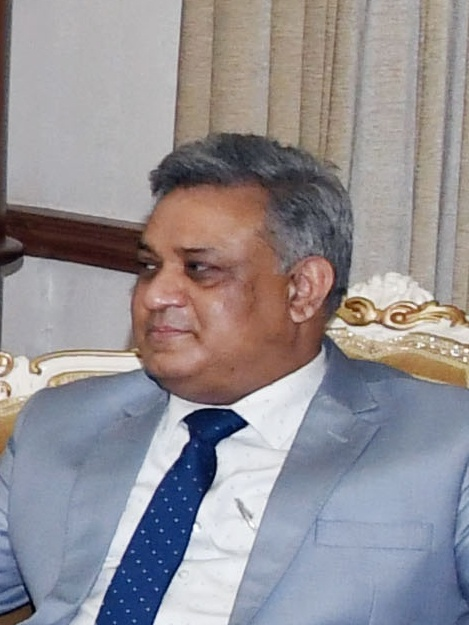
- Kamal in 2021

29th Vice-Chancellor of the University of Dhaka
- In office 4 November 2023 – 10 August 2024
- Chancellor: Mohammed Shahabuddin
- Preceded by: Mohammed Akhtaruzzaman
- Succeeded by: Niaz Ahmed Khan

Personal details
- Relations: A. K. M. Shahjahan Kamal (brother)
- Education: University of Dhaka; Tokyo Institute of Technology; University of Twente

ASM Maksud Kamal is a Bangladeshi academic who served as the 29th vice-chancellor of the University of Dhaka. Prior to that, he was pro-VC (academic) of the University of Dhaka. He also served as president of the Dhaka University Teachers Association as well as the Bangladesh Teachers Association.

== Career ==
Kamal joined the University of Dhaka as a lecturer in 2000 in the Department of Geology. Prior to that, he worked for six years as a scientific officer at the Bangladesh Space Research and Remote Sensing Organization (SPARRSO) and as a research fellow and researcher at the Bose Centre of Dhaka University. He served as the convener of Blue Panel, an Awami League-backed teacher organisation at the university. He was a member of the senate and syndicate of the university. He was also the provost of Masterda Surya Sen Hall for two terms. Kamal, has been elected for the fourth time in a row as president of Dhaka University Teachers Association. He resigned the vice-chancellorship on 10 August 2024.

== Controversy ==
In August 2026, the prosecution of the International Crimes Tribunal said that a formal charge sheet was being prepared against Kamal in connection with alleged crimes against humanity committed during the July Uprising. Prosecutor Gazi M. H. Tamim said that the investigation into Kamal and writer Muhammed Zafar Iqbal was nearing completion and that the charge sheet would be submitted after approval by the Chief Prosecutor.
