= Amirul Islam Chowdhury =

Bangladeshi academic (born 1942)

Vice-Chancellor of Jahangirnagar University
- In office 1994–1998

President of Asiatic Society of Bangladesh
- In office 3 January 2014 – 2017
- Preceded by: Nurul Islam
- Succeeded by: Mahfuza Khanam

Personal details
- Born: 1942 (age 83–84) Rangpur, Bengal Presidency, British India
- Education: Ph.D. (economics)
- Alma mater: University of Dhaka; University of Wales
- Occupation: University academic, scholar, economist

Amirul Islam Chowdhury (born 1942) is a Bangladeshi academic. He served as the vice-chancellor of Jahangirnagar University and president of Asiatic Society of Bangladesh. He is currently a professor at the United International University.

== Education ==
Chowdhury got his bachelor's and master's in economics from the University of Dhaka in 1961 and 1963 respectively. He earned his Ph.D. from the University of Wales in 1979. He later worked as a post-doctoral fellow at the Jawaharlal Nehru University during 1987–88.

== Career ==
Chowdhury served as a research officer at the Ministry of Finance of the Government of Pakistan during June 1964 – April 1965. He was a faculty member of Jahangirnagar University at the Department of Economics from January 1971 until October 2004. He was also a professor of economics at North South University for five years. He served as the vice-chancellor of Jahangirnagar University during July 1994 until 1998 and also of Gano Bishwabidyalaya for a year.

Chowdhury was the Chairman of the Board of Directors of the state-run Sonali Bank from August 2001 until August 2002. He is currently serving as the vice chairman of Centre for Urban Studies, Dhaka. He was elected the president of Asiatic Society of Bangladesh on 3 January 2014.
