= Niaz Ahmed Khan =

Bangladeshi academic and 30th Vice-Chancellor of the University of Dhaka

- নিয়াজ আহমেদ খান
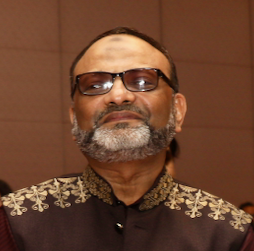
- Niaz in 2024

30th Vice-Chancellor of the University of Dhaka
- In office 27 August 2024 – 22 February 2026
- Chancellor: Mohammed Shahabuddin
- Preceded by: ASM Maksud Kamal
- Succeeded by: A B M Obaidul Islam

Personal details
- Born: 28 September 1966 (age 60) Lohagara, Chittagong District, East Pakistan
- Education: University of Wales

Niaz Ahmed Khan (born 28 September 1964) is a Bangladeshi academic, researcher, and development practitioner who was the 30th vice-chancellor of the University of Dhaka (DU). Prior to this, he served as the pro vice-chancellor of Independent University, Bangladesh and was a professor at the University of Dhaka and the University of Chittagong.

He resigned from the post of vice-chancellor of Dhaka University on 22 February 2026.

== Early life ==
Niaz Ahmad Khan was born in 1964 in Chunati village, located in the Lohagara Upazila of Chittagong. His great-grandfather, Khan Bahadur Nasir Uddin Khan, served as a deputy magistrate and deputy collector in undivided India. His grandfather, Kabir Uddin Ahmed Khan, was a deputy collector in the Assam-Bengal Civil Service and a first-class magistrate. His father, Shafique Ahmed Khan, worked as a consultant for the United Nations.

== Education ==
Niaz Ahmed Khan stood first in Comilla Board's 1981 SSC (Humanities) examination from Chittagong Government High School. Considering the school's rebranding in 1977, he was the first to have achieved this outstanding feat. He then repeated this feat in 1983 in HSC (Humanities) from Chittagong College.

Niaz completed his undergraduate studies in Public administration from the University of Chittagong in 1986. He completed his master's degree in 1987 from the same institution. In 1991, he earned a postgraduate diploma in human resource management from the Institute of Personnel Management. Khan then pursued his PhD from the University of Wales, Swansea, under a Commonwealth Scholarship. Subsequently, he conducted post-doctoral research at Oxford University, Swansea University, and the Asian Institute of Technology.

== Career ==
In 2006, Khan joined the University of Dhaka as a professor in the Department of Development Studies. Before this, he served as a professor in the Department of Public Administration at the University of Chittagong. He was a Distinguished visiting professor of development studies at the Asian University for Women and a senior Commonwealth Fellow/South Asian Fellow at Queen Elizabeth House, University of Oxford. Additionally, he served as the country representative for Bangladesh at the International Union for Conservation of Nature (IUCN) from 2009 to 2011 and played a key role as the senior program coordinator for the Chittagong Hill Tracts Development Facility (CHTDF) at the United Nations Development Program (UNDP) from 2004 to 2006. His career also includes positions as Asia Research Fellow at the Asian Institute of Technology (1996–1998) and operations manager at Palli Karma Sahayak Foundation (PKSF) from 1990 to 1992. Khan had served as the pro-vice chancellor of the Independent University, Bangladesh.

In August 2024, Khan was appointed the vice-chancellor of the University of Dhaka, succeeding Maksud Kamal. He resigned from that post on 22 February 2026.
