= A K M Siddiq =

Bangladeshi academic (died 2018)

Professor A K M Siddiq
- এ কে এম সিদ্দিক

18th Vice-Chancellor of the University of Dhaka
- In office 16 August 1983 – 21 March 1983
- Preceded by: Fazlul Halim Chowdhury
- Succeeded by: M. Shamshul Haque

A K M Siddiq, born Abul Khair Muhammad Siddiq, was an academic from Bangladesh who was the 18th Vice-Chancellor of Dhaka University.

== Early life ==
Siddiq was a PhD from the University of Saskatchewan in Physics. He joined the University of Dhaka in 1950.

== Career ==
Siddiq was the Vice-Chancellor of the University of Dhaka from 21 March 1983 to 16 August 1983.

Siddiq was the Pro-Vice Chancellor of the University of Dhaka from 24 August 1981 to 22 August 1985.

== Death ==
Siddiq died on 31 August 2018 in Gulshan, Dhaka, Bangladesh. He was buried in Manikganj District.
