= Kamruddin Ahmed =

Bangladeshi politician (1912–1982)

- কামরুদ্দীন আহমদ
- Born: 8 September 1912; Munshiganj, Bengal Presidency, British India
- Died: 6 February 1982 (aged 69); Dhaka, Bangladesh
- Education: University of Dhaka
- Spouses: Jobeda Khanam

Kamruddin Ahmed (8 September 1912 – 6 February 1982) was a Bangladeshi diplomat, lawyer and politician.

== Early life ==
Ahmed was born on 8 September 1912 in Sholaghar, Sreenagar Upazila, Munshiganj District, Bengal Presidency, British India. He graduated from Barisal Zilla School in 1929 and from B. M. College in 1931. He completed his B.A. in 1934 and M.A. in 1935 from the University of Dhaka in English. He then earned his bachelor's degree in law in 1944 from the same university.

== Career ==
Ahmed started his career as a teacher at Armanitola Government High School in Dhaka. He was a supporter of All-India Muslim League which he left after the partition of India in 1947. In East Pakistan, he joined the Sarba-daliya Rastrabhasa Sangram Parishad (All Party State Language Movement) which campaigned for Bengali language to be made a state language of Pakistan. In 1954, he joined the All Pakistan Awami Muslim League and was elected to the Central Committee of the party in 1955.

After leaving politics in 1955, he joined the Pakistan diplomatic service. He was appointed Deputy High Commissioner of Pakistan to India based in Kolkata in 1957 and left his post in 1958. He served as the Pakistani Ambassador to Myanmar during 1958–1961. In 1962, he became a lawyer. He was confined in jail by Pakistan Army during the Bangladesh Liberation war in 1971.

After the independence of Bangladesh, Ahmed served as the General Secretary of Trade Union Federation. From 1976 to 1978, he was the president of the Asiatic Society of Bangladesh. He wrote several historical books on Bengal and Bangladesh.

== Personal life and death ==
Ahmed was married to Jobeda Khanam. Their son, Nizamuddin Azad, was killed in the Bangladesh Liberation war; he was a student activist involved in a Communist Party group and a member of the Mukti Bahini.

Ahmed died in Dhaka on 6 February 1982.
