= SAARC Consortium on Open and Distance Learning =

The SAARC Consortium on Open and Distance Learning (SACODiL) is a regional cooperation agency set up under the auspices of the South Asian Association for Regional Cooperation (SAAR with the objectives of promoting cooperation and collaboration among institutions imparting knowledge through open and distance learning within member states, and promoting its use as a viable and cost-effective method of imparting quality education at all levels.

== History ==
During the Tenth SAARC Summit held in Colombo, Sri Lanka, a declaration was made on July 31, 1998, that; amongst other matters; mandated the establishment of a SAARC Forum of Vice Chancellors of Open Universities. This Forum, consisting of regional leaders in the field, should strengthen cooperation in areas such as the sharing and joint development of programmes, credit transfers for specific programmes and the translation of existing programmes.

The Forum first met in Colombo, Sri Lanka on January 25–27, 1999 and during the course of the meeting, deliberated in depth the operational modalities of the Forum including its objectives and membership. A Task Force, comprising the four Vice-Chancellors of Bangladesh, India, Pakistan and Sri Lanka and delegates from Bhutan, Maldives and Nepal, was formed which recommended, inter alia, that the organisation be designated as the SAARC Consortium of Open and Distance Learning (SACODiL).

The Task Force was eventually redesignated as the SACODiL Task Force met on August 23–25, 1999 at the SAARC Secretariat and proposed a regional mechanism for cooperation and collaboration in the SAARC region, and to promote the use of open and distance learning at all levels of education. The proposal identified the objectives of the SACODiL as joint development of programmes/courses, evolving mechanisms for credit transfer, accumulation and accreditation, sharing information technology to reach out to remote areas and under-privileged people and other matters relating to achieving the goals spelt out by the Vice-Chancellors during their Colombo Meeting.

The SAARC Forum of Vice Chancellors met for the second time on December 2–3, 2002 in New Delhi, India and a decision was made to operate SACODiL through a rotational Secretariat. The Board of Governors of SACODiL comprising the Vice Chancellors of National Open Universities or Heads of major open and distance learning institutions or educational bodies as well as National Focal Points of SAARC in the foreign ministries of the SAARC Member States and representation of the SAARC Secretary General was also constituted in this meeting.

The current Secretariat of SACODiL is the Bangladesh Open University in Dhaka, Bangladesh.

== Participating institutions ==
note: this section is not complete due to lack of information

Participating institutions of SACODiL include :

- Bangladesh

Bangladesh Open University

- India

Indira Gandhi National Open University

- http://www.mpisde.ac.in//

Institution of Secondary Distance Education

- Pakistan

Allama Iqbal Open University

- Sri Lanka

Open University of Sri Lanka

== See also ==
- South Asian Association for Regional Cooperation
