= A. A. M. S. Arefin Siddique =

Bangladeshi academic administrator (1953–2025)

- আবু আহসান মোহম্মদ সামসুল আরেফিন সিদ্দিক
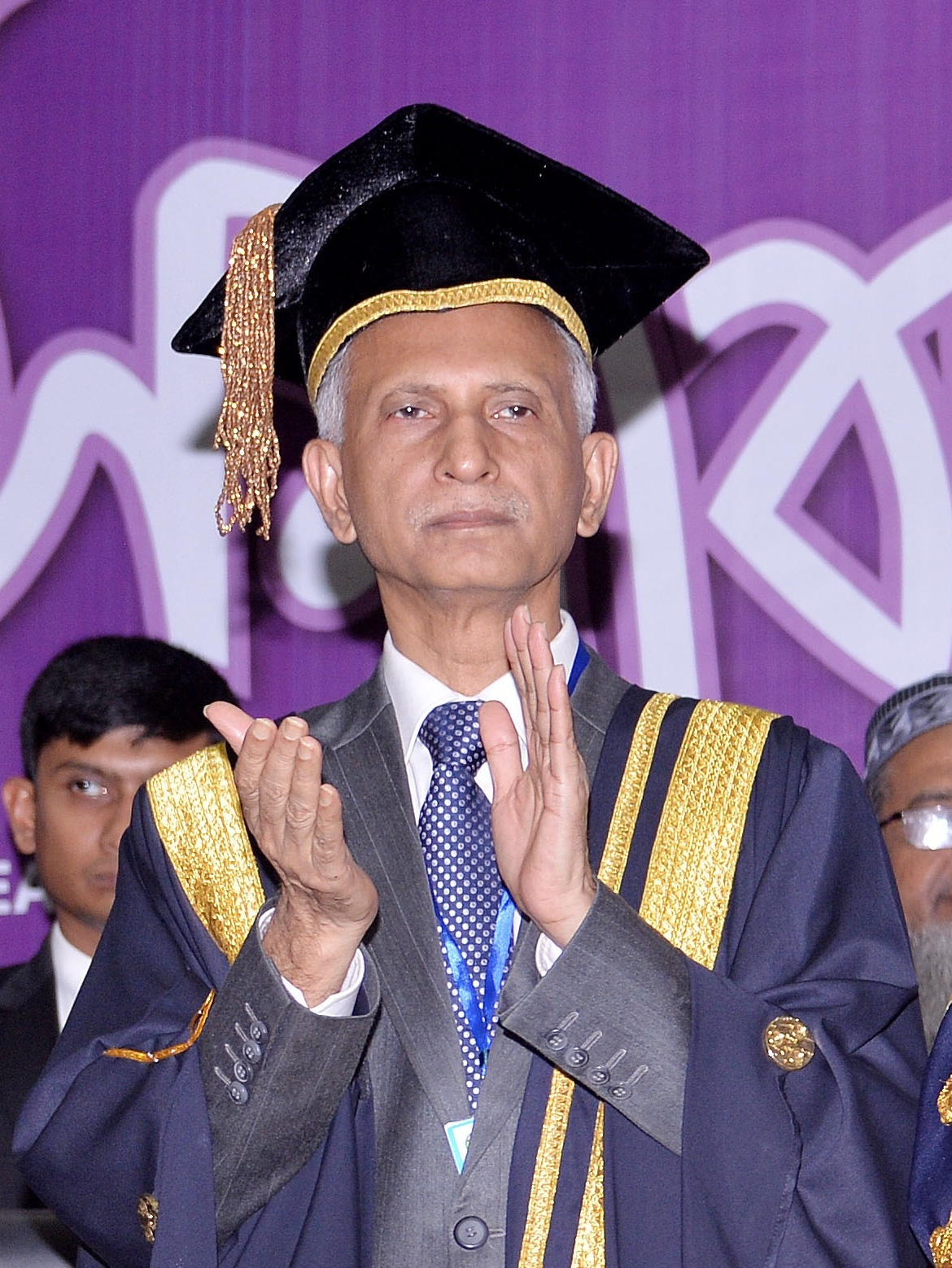
- Siddique at special convocation of Dhaka University in 2017.

27th Vice-Chancellor of the University of Dhaka
- In office 15 January 2009 – 7 September 2017
- Preceded by: Syed Mohammad Abul Faiz
- Succeeded by: Mohammad Akhtaruzzaman

Personal details
- Born: 26 October 1953 Dhaka, East Bengal, Pakistan
- Died: 13 March 2025 (aged 71) Dhaka, Bangladesh
- Education: PhD
- Alma mater: University of Mysore

Abu Ahsan Mohammad Shamsul Arefin Siddique (26 October 1953 – 13 March 2025) was a Bangladeshi academic who served as the 27th vice-chancellor of the University of Dhaka during 2009–2017. On 15 July 2020, he was appointed the chairman of the board of directors of Bangladesh Sangbad Sangstha (BSS). He was also president of the board of trustees of the Bangladesh National Museum.

== Early life and education ==
Siddique was born in Dhaka on 26 October 1953. His family is originally from Raipura Upazila, Narsingdi District. He graduated in science from Dhaka College in 1973. He earned his master's in mass communication and journalism from the University of Dhaka and topped the list in his batch. He earned his Ph.D. degree in televised teaching in 1985 from the University of Mysore in India under an Indian government scholarship.

== Career ==
Siddique joined the University of Dhaka in 1980, and his teaching career spans about four decades. He had also taught and trained at the universities of Manila, Minnesota, and at Cornell. Siddique was a visiting fellow at the Southern Illinois University at Carbondale. He was decorated with the 'Order of Civil Merit' by the King of Spain for his extraordinary contribution to the expansion of education, empowerment of women, and reduction of poverty.

Siddique was the chairman of the Bangladesh Sangbad Sangstha and a member of the governing body of the Press Institute of Bangladesh.

In January 2009, Siddique was appointed vice-chancellor of the University of Dhaka. He received a death threat from Ansarullah Bangla Team in 2015. He called on diplomatic ties between Bangladesh and Pakistan to be severed for allegedly interfering in the trial of war criminals from the Bangladesh Liberation War. His car was attacked in 2016 by activists of Bangladesh Chhatra League after the university published a souvenir book on the 95th anniversary of the university that called Ziaur Rahman the first president of Bangladesh. He oversaw the attachment of seven colleges to the University of Dhaka.

Siddique was vice-chancellor until August 2017, and was the longest-serving vice-chancellor of the University of Dhaka. He was a member of the search committee that selected his replacement. He was succeeded by Mohammed Akhtaruzzaman who was appointed by the government of Bangladesh, ignoring the search committee formed by the university senate. He returned to teaching at the Department of Mass Communication and Journalism. He retired from active teaching in 2020.

On 15 July 2020, Siddique was appointed the chairman of the board of directors of Bangladesh Sangbad Sangstha (BSS).

Siddique was the president of the board of trustees of the Bangladesh National Museum.

== Death ==
On 6 March 2025, Siddique suddenly fell over and hit his head while speaking at the Dhaka Club. He was taken to Ibrahim Cardiac Hospital in Dhaka and admitted to the intensive care unit. Siddique died of a stroke on 13 March, at the age of 71.
