= Syed Humayun Akhter =

Bangladeshi academic

8th Vice-Chancellor of Bangladesh Open University
- In office 30 June 2021 – 27 August 2024
- Chancellor: Mohammed Shahabuddin
- Preceded by: M A Mannan
- Succeeded by: A B M Obaidul Islam

Personal details
- Education: University of Dhaka

Syed Humayun Akhter is a Bangladeshi academic, earthquake researcher, and former vice-chancellor of Bangladesh Open University. He is the former Chairman of the Department of Geology and former Provost of Dr. Muhammad Shahidullah Hall at the University of Dhaka. He is a seismologist and established Dhaka University Earth Observatory (DUEO) at the University of Dhaka.

== Early life ==
Akhter was born on 26 February 1955 in Kushtia, East Pakistan, Pakistan. His father, Syed Abu Akhter Fazley Rob, was the president of the Bangladesh Medical Association- Kushtia, and his mother was Shahana Khatun. He completed his SSC from Mohini Mohan Vidyapith, Kushtia and HSC from Kushtia Government College in 1970 and 1972 respectively. He did his bachelor's degree and masters in geology at the University of Dhaka in 1975 and 1976 respectively. He completed his PhD at IIT Kharagpur.

== Career ==
Akhter started working at Prokaushali Sangsad Limited in 1979 and later worked at the National Museum of Bangladesh. He joined the University of Dhaka in 1987 as a lecturer in the Department of Geology. He worked with Columbia University to install a seismometer in Chittagong in 2007 nearly two decades after the last one stopped working.

From July 2013 to June 2016, Akhter was the Chairman of the Department of Geology at the University of Dhaka. He was the provost of Dr. Muhammad Shahidullah Hall.

In June 2021, Akhter was appointed the Vice-Chancellor of Bangladesh Open University. He oversaw the Bangladesh Open University signing an agreement with the Columbia University to cooperate in climate change research.
