= A. T. M. Zahurul Huq =

A. T. M. Zahurul Huq (died 2017) was a Bangladeshi academic, professor of economics of the University of Dhaka, and former chairman of the University Grants Commission of Bangladesh. He is a former chairman of Dhaka WASA. He was the Dean of the faculty of Social Science at Stamford University, Bangladesh.

== Career ==
Huq completed a study on Sources of Statistics on Bangladesh in 1978 for the Bureau of Economic Research at the University of Dhaka.

In 1991, Huq wrote the chapter on Transport Planning in Bangladesh in the Thoughts on Economics Vol 1 in 1991.

Huq wrote chapters for the Addressing the Urban Poverty Agenda in Bangladesh book published in 1997.

Huq was the chairman of the department of economics at the University of Dhaka. Huq retired from the University of Dhaka in 1997. He was then appointed chairman of Dhaka WASA. He served in that position till 1998.

From 1999 to 2003, Huq was the chairman of the University Grants Commission of Bangladesh. He was the Dean of the faculty of Social Science at Stamford University, Bangladesh. He was the founder of the department of economics at Stamford University. He was a life member of the Bangladesh Economic Association.

== Death ==
Huq died on 7 February 2017. He was buried in the Mirpur intellectuals' graveyard. He was posthumously awarded the Bangladesh Economics Teachers Association.
