= Mahfuza Khanam =

Bangladeshi academic and social activist (1946–2025)

- মাহফুজা খানম
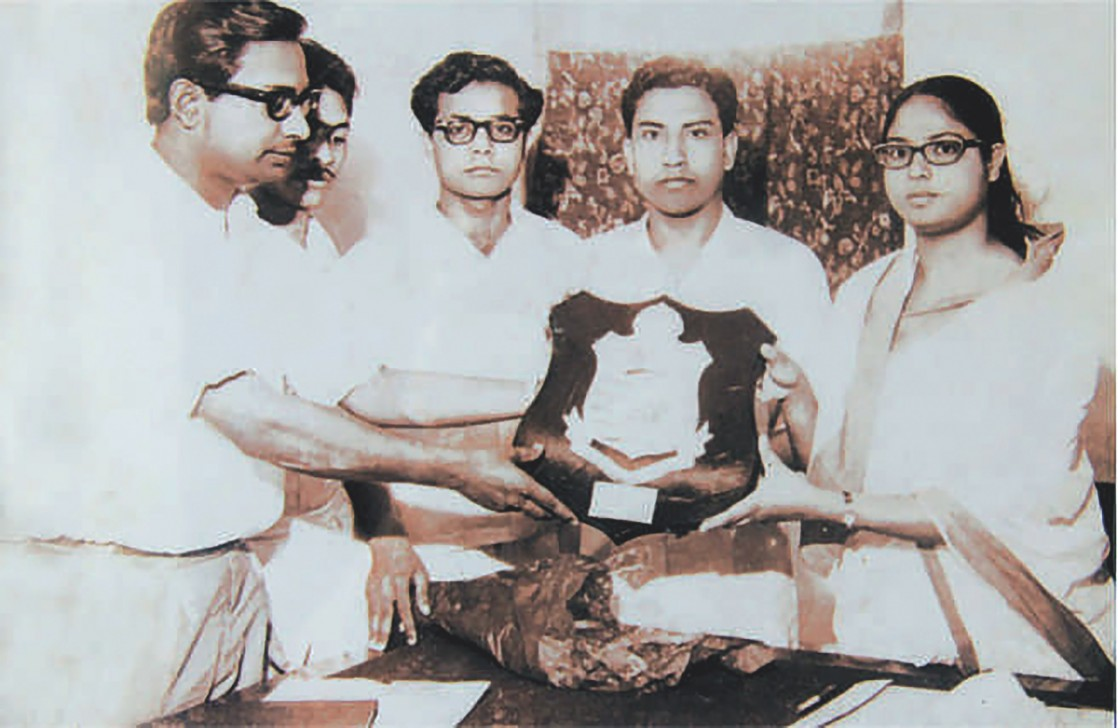
- Khanam (far-right) accepting award from Mohiuddin Ahmed in 1967

President of Asiatic Society of Bangladesh
- In office 22 January 2018 – 2021
- Preceded by: Amirul Islam Chowdhury
- Succeeded by: Khondoker Bazlul Hoque

Personal details
- Born: 14 April 1946 Calcutta, Bengal Province, British India
- Died: 12 August 2025 (aged 79) Dhaka, Bangladesh
- Spouse: Shafique Ahmed (m. 1969)

Mahfuza Khanam (14 April 1946 – 12 August 2025) was a Bangladeshi academic and social activist. She was the president of Asiatic Society of Bangladesh from 2018 to 2021. She was awarded Begum Rokeya Padak (2012), Anannya Top Ten Awards (2013) and Ekushey Padak (2021)

== Early life and career ==
Khanam was born on 14 April 1946 in Calcutta, Bengal Province, British India to Mustafizur Rahman Khan and Saleha Khanam.

She attended Bangla Bazar Girls’ School and graduated with bachelor's and master's degrees in physics from University of Dhaka in 1966 and 1967.

As a student, Khanam became the vice-president of Dhaka University Central Students' Union (DUCSU). In 2009, Khanam served as the General Secretary of Asiatic Society of Bangladesh.

Khanam served as the director general of Directorate of Secondary and Higher Education. She served as the chairperson of Khelaghar Ashor, an organisation for children. She was also the president of several organisations including Manikganj Samity in Dhaka, Peshajibi Nari Samaj (Professional Women Society) and Federation of World Teachers' Association (FWTA). She was a vice-president on the executive committee of the Itihas Academy. She also served as 15th Principal of Manikgonj Government Women's College, Manikgonj.

== Personal life and death ==
In 1969, she married Shafique Ahmed, a barrister and a former minister of law and had three children.

Mahfuza died on 12 August 2025, at the age of 79, after collapsing while swimming at the Officers Club, Dhaka.

== Award ==
Begum Mahfuza Khanom was awarded Ekushey Padak, the second highest civilian award in Bangladesh. In 2021, The Ministry of Cultural Affairs gave the award to 21 distinguished citizens of the country for outstanding contributions in their respective fields. She got the award for contributions in education.
