= Shahid Uddin Ahmed =

Bangladeshi academic (born 1947)

Professor Shahid Uddin Ahmed

Vice-Chancellor of the University of Dhaka
- In office 29 September 1996 – 31 August 1996
- Preceded by: Emajuddin Ahmed
- Succeeded by: Abul Kalam Azad Chowdhury

Personal details
- Born: 1947 (age 78–79) Feni, Bangladesh
- Occupation: Professor, University Administrator

Shahid Uddin Ahmed (born 1947) is a Bangladeshi academic who served as the Vice-Chancellor of the University of Dhaka.

== Career ==
Ahmed began his academic career as a lecturer at the University of Dhaka and was later promoted to professor in the department of management studies.

Ahmed served as the Vice-Chancellor of the University of Dhaka from 31 August 1996 to 29 September 1996. He succeeded Professor Emajuddin Ahamed and was replaced by Professor Abul Kalam Azad Chowdhury. He was an editor of the National Curriculum and Textbook Board.

Ahmed is an advisor of the College of Fashion Technology & Management.

== Bibliography ==
- Insurance in Bangladesh.
