= R I M Aminur Rashid =

Bangladeshi academic (1945–2025)

6th Vice-Chancellor of Bangladesh Open University
- In office 25 January 2009 – 24 January 2013
- Chancellor: Zillur Rahman
- Preceded by: Farid Ahmed
- Succeeded by: M A Mannan

Personal details
- Born: 13 February 1945 Bogra, Bangladesh
- Died: 8 August 2025 (aged 80) Dhaka, Bangladesh
- Education: University of Dhaka, University of Kent at Canterbury

R I M Aminur Rashid, also known as Rafiqul Islam Muhammad Aminur Rashid (13 February 1945 – 8 August 2025) was a Bangladeshi academic, theoretical physicist and former vice-chancellor of Bangladesh Open University. He was a former professor in the Department of Physics at the University of Dhaka.

== Education ==
He earned his BSc (Hons) and MSc in Physics from the University of Dhaka and a PhD degree from the University of Kent, Canterbury, England. He also did his post-doctoral research at Chalmers University of Technology, Gothenburg, Sweden, and at The University of Oxford, England.

== Career ==
Rashid was a professor in the Department of Physics at the University of Dhaka. He was a fellow of the Bangladesh Physical Society and served as the Vice-Chancellor of the Bangladesh Open University (BOU) from January 25, 2009, to January 24, 2013. In his career Professor Rashid served as the Chairman of the Department of Physics at the University of Dhaka, Dean of the Faculty of Science, Provost of S. M. Hall, President of the Dhaka University Teachers’ Association and President of the Bangladesh Physical Society. He was also a Senior Associate at ICTP (The Abdus Salam International Centre for Theoretical Physics), Trieste, Italy.

== Notable contribution in superfluid physics: Evans–Rashid transition ==
During the 1970s, Rashid collaborated with W. A. B. Evans on a many-body theoretical approach to superfluidity. In 1973, they published “A conserving approximation evaluation of superfluid density within the pair theory of superfluids”, in which they developed a linear-response framework using pairing (two-particle) propagators to compute the superfluid density in interacting Bose or Fermi systems, ensuring conservation laws in the approximations. They further presented an extended exposition in a chapter in Low Temperature Physics — LT13. In later literature, the term Evans–Rashid transition is used to denote a BCS-like “pair condensation” instability in bosonic systems: under effective attractive interactions, the critical condition is when the two-particle (pair) susceptibility diverges, analogous to how BCS superconductivity arises in fermions. Some analyses (e.g. Stoof 1994) apply this concept to dilute Bose gases with negative scattering length, discussing whether such a pairing transition could precede or compete with Bose–Einstein condensation. Subsequent works have explored stability, collapse, and the region of metastability of the Evans–Rashid paired phase (e.g. in weakly attractive Bose gases) and studied how it is suppressed or preempted by mechanical collapse or first-order transitions in realistic systems. Thus, Rashid's coauthored work is regarded as part of the theoretical underpinning of the Evans–Rashid pairing transition idea in bosonic many-body physics.
