= Serajul Huq (educator) =

Bangladeshi educator

- Born: 1 April 1905; Noakhali, East Bengal and Assam, British India
- Died: 4 March 2005 (aged 99)
- Education: University of Dhaka (BA, MA); University of London (PhD)
- Awards: Full list

Serajul Huq (1 April 1905 – 4 March 2005) was a Bangladeshi educationist.

== Early life and education ==
Huq was born in Noakhali District in 1905 to Moulvi Hamidullah. He passed matriculation examination in 1921 from Dhaka Muhsinia Madrasa and intermediate examination in 1923 from Dhaka Islamic Intermediate College. He then enrolled to the University of Dhaka. He earned BA with honors in Islamic studies in 1926 and MA in Persian in 1930. In 1938, he received his PhD on "Ibn Taymiyyah and His Project of Reform" under the supervision of Professor Hamilton Gibb, a Scottish historian and Orientalist, from the University of London.

== Career ==
In 1928, Huq joined the University of Dhaka as an assistant lecturer at the Department of Arabic and Islamic Studies. He became a lecturer in 1936, a reader in 1943 and a professor in 1951. In 1979, Huq was elected President of the Asiatic Society of Bangladesh.

== Awards ==
- Sitara-i-Imtiaz (1969)
- Fellowship of the Asiatic Society of Bangladesh (1973)
- Independence Day Award (1983)
- Islamic Foundation Padak (1985)
- Professor Sukumar Sen Gold Medal of the Asiatic Society of Calcutta (1996)
- Ekushey Padak (1997)
