= Abu Mohammed Habibullah =

Bangladeshi historian and writer

- আবু মহামেদ হবিবুল্লাহ

President of Bangla Academy
- In office 19 November 1982 – 3 June 1983
- Preceded by: Abdul Haque Faridi
- Succeeded by: Abdullah-Al-Muti

Personal details
- Died: 3 June 1983 (aged 71–72)

Abu Mohammed Habibullah (1911 – 3 June 1983), also known as ABM Habibullah, was a Bangladeshi historian and writer.

== Early life ==
Habibullah was born on 1911 in Burdwan District, West Bengal, British India. He graduated from Hughli Madrasa in 1926 and Islamic Intermediate College, Dhaka (later Kabi Nazrul Government College) in 1928. He graduated with a B.A. in history from Hooghly Mohsin College in 1931 and a M.A. in history from the University of Calcutta in 1933. He earned his PhD from the School of Oriental Studies of the University of London. He also received a diploma in library science.

== Career ==
Habibullah joined Calcutta Madrasa in 1938 as a librarian. He joined the History Department of the University of Calcutta as a lecturer in 1939. He transferred next year to the Department of Islamic History and Culture, a newly created department at the University of Calcutta. In 1950, he joined the University of Dhaka. He was one of the founders of Asiatic Society of Pakistan. From 1961 to 1963, he served as the dean of Dean of the Faculty of Arts. He was the president of the Dhaka University Teachers' Association from 1968 to 1972. He served as the chair of the Department of Islamic History and Culture in University of Dhaka until 1973. From 1976 to 1977, he was chairman of University Grants Commission. He also worked as the curator of Dhaka Museum.

== Death and legacy ==
Habibulllah died on 3 June 1983. The Department of Islamic History and Culture of the University of Dhaka established the Abu Mohammed Habibullah Memorial Library in his memory.
