= Encyclopedia of Flora and Fauna of Bangladesh =

- Language: Bengali
- Genre: Encyclopedia
- Publisher: Asiatic Society of Bangladesh
- Publication place: Bangladesh

The Encyclopedia of Flora and Fauna is a multi-volume encyclopedia. It has been published by Asiatic Society of Bangladesh. It covers the biodiversity of Bangladesh.

== Volumes ==
The Encyclopedia of Flora and Fauna of Bangladesh has been published in 28 volumes. Among the volumes 11 are about flora, 14 volumes about fauna, one volume is about Bangladesh and there are two index volumes.

=== Volumes ===
==== Bangladesh profile ====
This is a 230-page encyclopedia. It covers in 20 articles about the environment of Bangladesh. It describes about the Sundarban.

==== Cyanobacteria, Bacteria and Fungi ====
This 415 page volume contains about the Prokaryotes.

==== Algae (Chlorophyta: Aphanochaetaceae- Zygnemataceae) ====
Division Chlorophyta or green algae is abundant in Bangladesh, the world's second largest delta next to the Amazon basin in Brazil . This volume describes 1,317 species collected from this land and studied by one of the most celebrated algologist of the country, National Professor A K M Nurul Islam. The species Ireksokonia formosa, endemic to lake Baikal was isolated from Bangladesh and is described in this volume. 812 pp.

==== Algae: Clorophyta – Rhodophyta ====
(Achnanthaceae – Vaucheriaceae) This volume adds an additional 800 species of algae to those described in Volume 3 bringing the algal biodiversity of the country to nearly 2000 species. Mostly aquatic, this rich biodiversity is in considerable threat due to habitat loss as a result of intense human activity and rapid depletion of water bodies. 543 pp

==== Volumes 5 - 12 ====
The volume 5- 12 contains from bryophytes to higher dicotyledonous plants.

==== Index volume flora ====
It is the index of flora of Bangladesh.

==== Volumes 13- 28 ====
describe the fauna of Bangladesh.

== Volume editors ==
Chief Editor Zia Uddin Ahmed

Editors Flora Z N Tahmida Begum M Abul Hassan Moniruzzaman Khondker

Fauna Syed M Humayun Kabir Monawar Ahmad Abu Tweb Abu Ahmed A K Ataur Rahman Enam Ul Haque
