= Shafique Ahmed =

Bangladeshi politician (1937–2026)

- শফিক আহমেদ
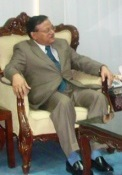
- Ahmed in 2010

Minister for Law, Justice and Parliamentary Affairs
- In office 6 January 2009 – 21 November 2013
- Preceded by: A F Hasan Arif
- Succeeded by: Anisul Huq

Personal details
- Born: 16 July 1937 Comilla District, Bengal Province, British India
- Died: 12 April 2026 (aged 88) Dhaka, Bangladesh
- Party: Bangladesh Awami League
- Spouse: Mahfuza Khanam (m. 1969–2025)
- Education: Dhaka College; University of Dhaka; King's College London

Shafique Ahmed (16 July 1937 – 12 April 2026) was a Bangladesh Awami League politician. He served as the Minister for Law, Justice and Parliamentary Affairs of the Government of Bangladesh.

== Education ==
Ahmed earned his bachelor's and master's in geography from the University of Dhaka in 1958 and 1959 respectively. He earned his LL.B degree from the same university in 1963. He earned his LL.M degree from King's College London in 1967. He received his Bar-at-law from Lincoln's Inn in 1967.

== Career ==
Ahmed served as an adjunct faculty member at the Law Department of Dhaka University from 1969 to 1973. He also served as the Principal of City Law College, Dhaka from 1973 to 2005. Concurrently, he was a member of the Dhaka University Senate. He was enrolled as an advocate at the High Court in 1967 and was elevated to the status of a Senior Advocate in the Appellate Division in 1989. He was elected President of the Supreme Court Bar Association on two occasions: 1999-2000 and 2008–2009. Furthermore, he contributed to the governance of the legal profession by serving as the vice-president of the Bangladesh Bar Council.

== Personal life and death ==
Ahmed married academic and activist Mahfuza Khanam in 1969 and had three children. Mahfuza died in 2025.

Ahmed died at the Bangladesh Medical College Hospital in Dhaka, on 12 April 2026, at the age of 88.
