= Abdur Rahman Khan (writer) =

Pakistani Bengali educator and writer

Khan Bahadur Abdur Rahman Khan
- খান বাহাদুর আবদুর রহমান খান
- Born: 1890; Bhandariakandi, Bengal Presidency, British India (now in Shibchar Upazila, Madaripur District)
- Died: 23 December 1964 (aged 73–74); Dhaka, East Pakistan, Pakistan
- Education: Dhaka College; Calcutta University
- Occupations: Educator, writer
- Spouse: Khadijah Khatun
- Children: 4, including Fazlur Rahman Khan
- Relatives: Abdul Jabbar Khan (daughters father-in-law); A.Z.M. Enayetullah Khan (son-in-law)

Khan Bahadur Abdur Rahman Khan (Bengali: খান বাহাদুর আবদুর রহমান খান; 1890 – 23 December 1964) was a Pakistani Bengali educator and writer. He was the president of the Asiatic Society of Pakistan from 1957 to 1961. He was the former principal of Jagannath College.

== Early life ==
Khan was born in 1890 in Bhandariakandi, Shibchar Upazila, Madaripur District, Bengal Presidency, British India. He graduated from Barishal Zilla School. In 1912, he completed his bachelor's degree from Dhaka College and his master's in 1914 from the University of Calcutta in English.

== Career ==
In 1914, Khan joined the Dhaka Training College as a lecturer. He taught at various colleges and worked at the Education Department. In 1926, he was appointed secretary of the board of education. In 1932, he was awarded the title Khan Bahadur by the British Government. In 1933, he was made a school inspector and in 1939, he was appointed Additional Director of Public Instruction.

In 1948, Khan was appointed the principal of Jagannath College (later upgraded to Jagannath University) a position he served till his retirement in 1956. He gave a speech with Sheikh Mujibur Rahman on 4 June 1956 at a Nazrul Jayanti organized by East Pakistan Youth League. From 1957 to 1961, he was the president of the Asiatic Society of Pakistan, of which he was a founding member. He established Asalat Memorial School. His academic work was focused on Islamic culture and history.

== Social activities ==
He was president of the Asiatic Society of Pakistan from 1957 to 1959. He was vice-president of Bangla Academy till his death. He represented the East Pakistan Secondary Teachers Association at the World Teachers' Conference held in Rome in 1958 and in the United States in 1959. He established a school named Aslat Memorial School in honour of his father in his village Bhandarikandi. He played a leading role in the establishment of the Central Women's College in 1956 and was its founding president.

== Death ==
Khan died on 23 December 1964 in Dhaka. He is buried at Azimpur graveyard.

Khan's son, Fazlur Rahman Khan, was a notable architect and engineer who designed the Willis Tower.

== Bibliography ==
- Moslem Nari (1927)
- Char Iyar (1932)
- Shes Nabi (1949)
- Islam Parichiti (1952)
- Quran Sharif Volume 1-3
- Hadith Volume 1-3
- Islamic Tamaddun O Pakistan (1956)
- Naya Khutba (1959)
- Sahih Bukhari Sharif (1961)
- Amar Jiban (1964)
