= Mohammad Asaduzzaman =

Bangladeshi educator (1948 – 2008)

- মোহাম্মদ আসাদুজ্জামান
- Died: 28 March 2008 (aged 60); Dhaka, Bangladesh
- Resting place: Mirpur Martyred Intellectual Graveyard
- Occupations: university administrator, academic
- Awards: Ekushey Padak (2006)

Mohammad Asaduzzaman (c. 1948 – 28 March 2008) was a Bangladeshi educator. He was a professor in the Public Administration Department of Dhaka University and Chairman of the University Grants Commission of Bangladesh (UGC). He was awarded the Ekushey Padak in 2006.

Asaduzzaman died of cardiac arrest at Birdem Hospital in Dhaka on 28 March 2008.
