= Sayed Moazzem Hossain =

Bangladeshi academic (1901–1991)

Syed Moazzem Hossain

6th Vice-Chancellor of the University of Dhaka
- In office 22 October 1948 – 8 November 1953
- Preceded by: Mahmud Hasan
- Succeeded by: Walter Allen Jenkins

Personal details
- Born: 1901 Baniara village, Tangail District, Bengal Presidency, British India
- Died: 1991 (aged 89–90)
- Education: University of Dhaka; Oxford University; Dalhousie University
- Occupation: university academic

Syed Moazzem Hossain (1901–1991) was a Bangladeshi academic and Islamic scholar. He served as the vice-chancellor of the University of Dhaka.

== Early life and education ==
Hossain was born on 1 August 1901, to a Bengali Muslim family of Syeds in the village of Baniara in Mirzapur, Tangail District. He earned his Master's in Arabic from the University of Dhaka in 1924. He then joined the same university as a research scholar in Bangla. In 1926, he went to Oxford University to obtain D Phil and D Litt degrees, writing his thesis on classical Arabic poetry. He then earned his LLD degree from Dalhousie University in 1949.

== Career ==
He joined as a reader in the Department of Arabic at the University of Dhaka in 1930. He served as the vice-chancellor of the university during 1948–1953.

In 1984, he was awarded the Islamic Foundation Award for Education. He was also awarded the Ekushey Padak in the year 1978 by the Bangladesh Government. List of Ekushey Padak award recipients (1976–79)

His published several books include Marifatul Ilmul Hadith, Kalbiatul Jahelia, Nakhbatum Min Kitabil Ektiarin and Kasidatu Jahelia.
