= A. B. M. Obaidul Islam =

Bangladeshi physicist and academic administrator

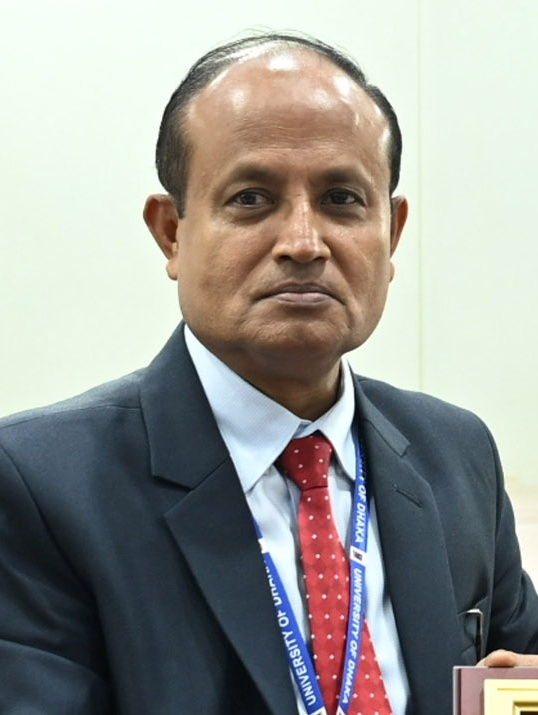
- Obaidul in 2026

Vice-Chancellor University of Dhaka
- Incumbent
- Assumed office 16 March 2026
- Chancellor: Mohammed Shahabuddin
- Preceded by: Niaz Ahmed Khan

Vice-Chancellor Bangladesh Open University
- In office 15 September 2024 – 16 March 2026
- Preceded by: Syed Humayun Akhter
- Succeeded by: Siddiqur Rahman Khan

Personal details
- Born: Morrelganj, Bagerhat, Bangladesh
- Education: University of Dhaka; University of Toyama
- Occupation: Academic and physicist

A. B. M. Obaidul Islam is a Bangladeshi physicist. He is a professor in the Department of Physics at the University of Dhaka and the current Vice-Chancellor of the university. Prior to assuming his role as the Vice-Chancellor of Dhaka University, he served as the Vice-Chancellor of Bangladesh Open University.

== Early life and education ==
Obaidul Islam was born in Morrelganj, Bagerhat District. He completed his bachelor's degree in 1987 and his master's degree in 1988 from the Department of Physics at the University of Dhaka. He earned his PhD from the University of Toyama, Japan, in 1999.

== Career ==
Islam began his teaching career in 1989 as a lecturer in the Department of Physics at the University of Dhaka. Throughout a career spanning nearly four decades, he was promoted to the rank of Professor within the same department and has played an active role in both teaching and research.

== Research ==
The primary research fields of Professor Islam are semiconductor physics and solar cell technology. He specifically works on the fabrication and characterization of semiconductor compound thin films for solar cell applications.

== Selected publications ==
- Fritsche, R.; Wisotzki, E.; Islam, A. B. M. O.; Thissen, A.; Klein, A.; Jaegermann, W.; Rudolph, R.; Tonti, D.; Pettenkofer, C. (25 February 2002). "Electronic passivation of Si(111) by Ga–Se half-sheet termination". Applied Physics Letters. 80 (8): 1388–1390. doi:10.1063/1.1454228. ISSN 0003-6951.
- Islam, A. B. M. O.; Thissen, A.; Klein, A.; Jaegermann, W. (20 November 2004). "Deposition of the layered semiconductor SnS2 onto H-terminated Si(111) surfaces: failure of van der Waals epitaxy and possible implications". Surface Science. 572 (2): 476–482. doi:10.1016/j.susc.2004.09.030. ISSN 0039-6028.
- Hossain, Mohammed Ifteker; Kamruzzaman, Md.; Obaidul Islam, A. B. M. (1 March 2015). "Effects of temperature in electrodeposition of ZnTe thin films". Journal of Materials Science: Materials in Electronics. 26 (3): 1756–1762. doi:10.1007/s10854-014-2604-9. ISSN 1573-482X.
- Rashid, M. H.; Rabeya, J.; Doha, M. H.; Islam, O.; Reith, P.; Hopman, G.; Hilgenkamp, H. (1 September 2018). "Characterization of single step electrodeposited Cu2ZnSnS4 thin films". Journal of Optics. 47 (3): 256–262. doi:10.1007/s12596-018-0463-0. ISSN 0974-6900.
- Islam, A. B. M. O; Tambo, T; Tatsuyama, C (1 December 2000). "Passivation of GaAs surface by GaS". Vacuum. 59 (4): 894–899. doi:10.1016/S0042-207X(00)00397-3. ISSN 0042-207X.

== Political and social roles ==
In addition to his professional teaching career, Islam is actively involved in politics. He serves as the Secretary of Education Affairs for the Central Committee of the Bangladesh Nationalist Party (BNP). Additionally, he led the Sada Dal (White Panel), the pro-BNP teachers' organization at Dhaka University, as its central convener for a long period. He also serves as the president of the 'University Teachers Association of Bangladesh' (UTAB).
