= Ahmad Fazlur Rahman =

Bengali academic

Sir Ahmad Fazlur Rahman
- আহমেদ ফজলুর রহমান
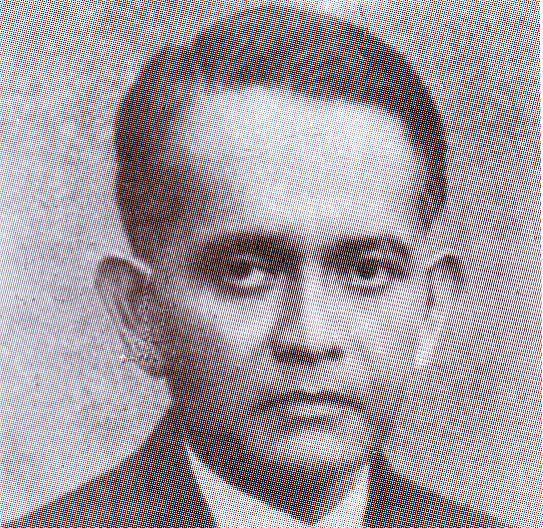
- Born: 28 December 1889; Jalpaiguri, Bengal Presidency
- Died: 24 March 1945 (aged 55)
- Education: University of Oxford; University of Calcutta
- Occupation: Academic
- Parents: Moulvi Abdur Rahman (father); Begum Rahimunessa (mother)

Sir Ahmad Fazlur Rahman (Bengali: আহমেদ ফজলুর রহমান; 28 December 1889 – 24 March 1945), also known as A. F. Rahman, was a Bengali academic. He served as the first Bengali Vice-chancellor of the University of Dhaka during 1934–1936. He was knighted by the British Government of India in 1942.

== Early life and education ==
Fazlur Rahman was born on 28 December 1889, to a Bengali Muslim parents Abdur Rahman and Begum Rahimunnessa in Jalpaiguri, Bengal Presidency. His father was a scholar originally from Feni in eastern Bengal. Rahman passed matriculation examination from Jalpaiguri Zila School in 1908. He earned his bachelor's and master's degrees in history in 1912 from the Oxford University and Calcutta University in 1913 respectively. He then spent two years researching political economy at the London School of Economics.

== Career ==
In 1914, Rahman joined the Calcutta University Commission as a sub-editor. He started his academic career as a lecturer in history in Aligarh Anglo-Oriental College (later Aligarh Muslim University) in 1914. After establishment of the University of Dhaka on 1 July 1921, he joined as reader in the Department of History at the University of Dhaka at the request of the first vice-chancellor, Philip Joseph Hartog.

Rahman was elected a member of the Bengal Legislative Council in 1923 from the Dhaka University constituency. He served as the chairman of the Dhaka Secondary and Higher Secondary Education Board in 1934.

In 1937, the University of Dhaka conferred on Rahman the Honorary Doctorate Degree.

== Legacy ==
A residence hall at the University of Dhaka campus is named after him - "Sir A. F. Rahman Hall" - in 1976. Another residence hall at the University of Chittagong campus is named after him - "Sir A. F. Rahman Hall" - in 1970
