= History of the University of Dhaka =

The University of Dhaka was established in 1921 as the first university in East Bengal. Following demands from Nawab Sir Khwaja Salimullah Bahadur and others, Viceroy Lord Hardinge proposed on 2 February 1912, that a new university should be established in this partition of Bengal.

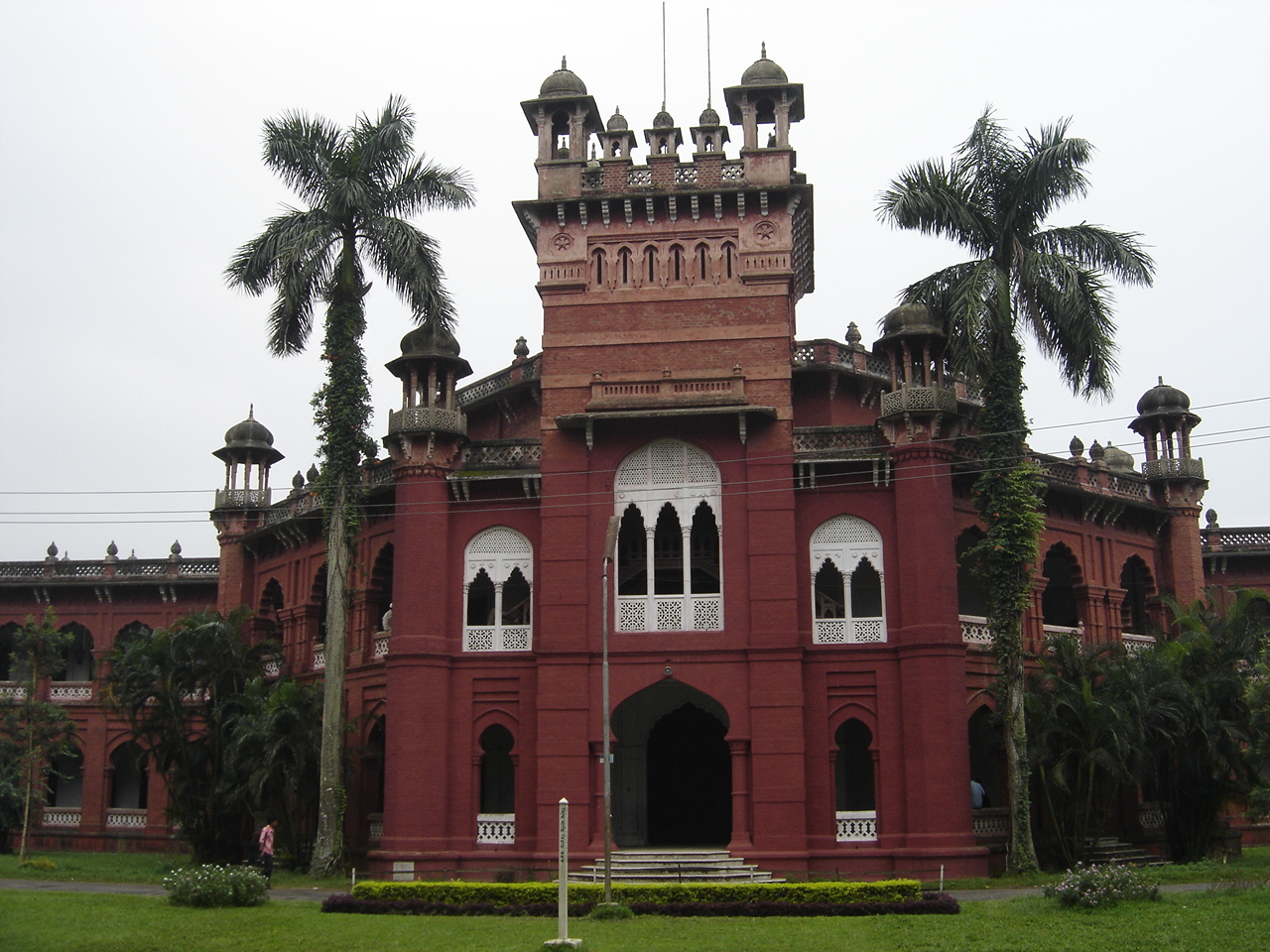
Curzon Hall, where the science faculty of University of Dhaka was established in 1921.

== Introduction ==
The University was established as compensation for the annulment of the 1905 Partition of Bengal. The partition had established East Bengal and Assam as a separate province, with Dhaka as its capital. However, the partition was abolished in 1911. In 1913, public opinion was solicited before the university scheme was given its final shape, and the Secretary of State approved it in December 1913. The first vice-chancellor of the university was Philip Joseph Hartog, who had been academic registrar of the University of London for 17 years.

== Foundation and early days ==
Established in 1921, under the Dacca University Act 1920 of the Indian Legislative Council, the university is modelled after British universities. Academic activities started on 1 July 1921, with three faculties: Arts, Science, and Law. Classes were taught in 12 departments: Sanskrit and Bengali, English, Education, History, Arabic and Islamic Studies, Persian and Urdu, Philosophy, Economics and Politics, Physics, Chemistry, Mathematics, and Law. Initially there were three dormitories for students: Salimullah Muslim Hall, Dacca Hall and Jagannath Hall.

=== Opposition ===
Many notable people, especially Hindu leaders, opposed the then government's intention to establish the University of Dhaka. Advocate Dr Rashbehari Ghosh told viceroy that the establishment of a separate university at Dhaka would promote 'an internal partition of Bengal'. They also contended that "Muslims of Eastern Bengal were in large majority cultivators and they would benefit in no way by the foundation of a university". Asutosh Mukherjee, vice-chancellor of Calcutta University, also opposed its creation. According to Major General M. A. Matin, Rabindranath Tagore attended the Gorer Math Rally which was against the formation of the university. However, the validity of his statement remains debatable.

=== Establishment and the British era ===
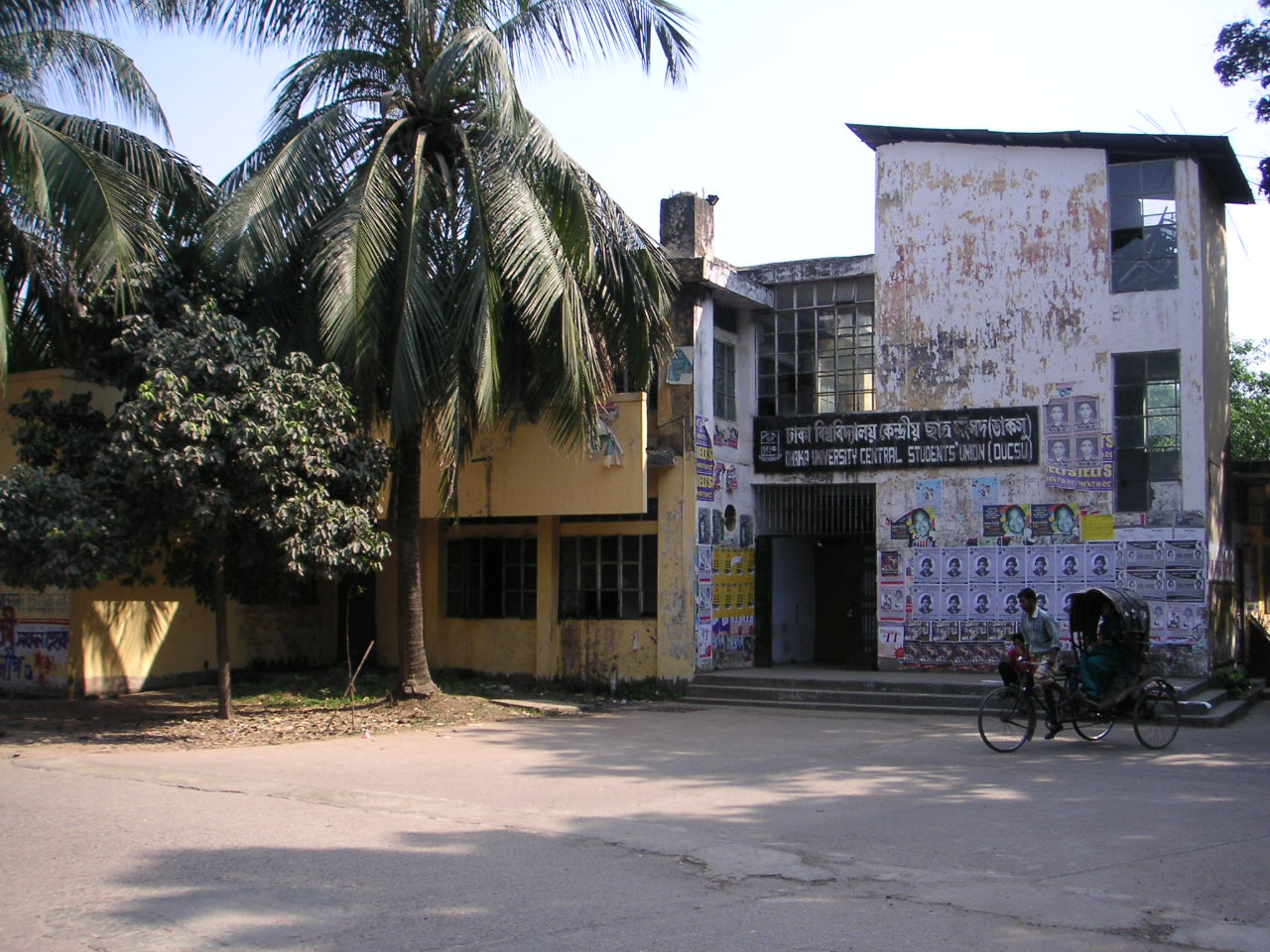
Dhaka University Central Students Union building

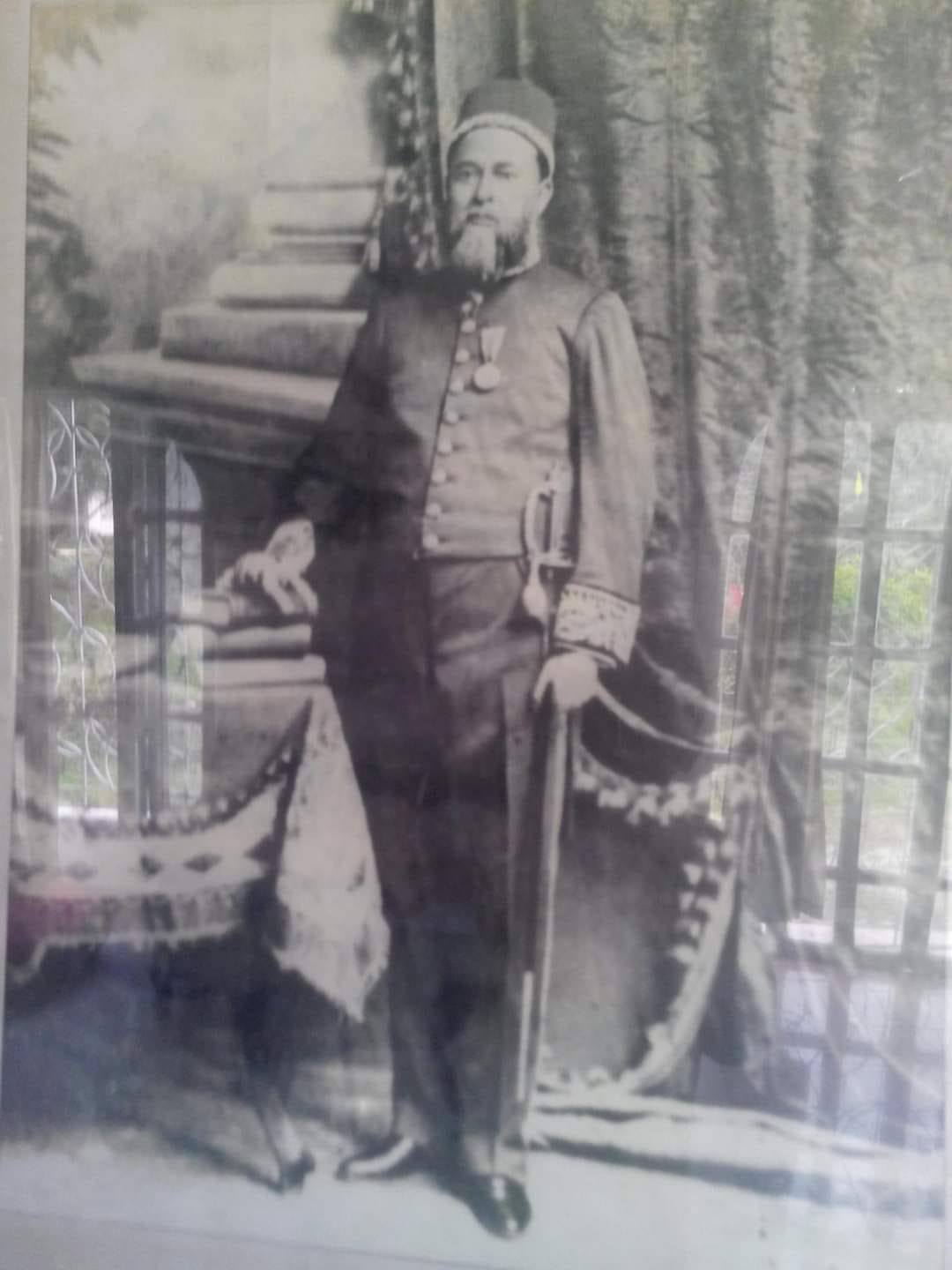
Sir Syed Nawab Ali Chowdhury, one of the proposers of University of Dhaka

Under Vice-Chancellor Mahmud Hussain, the University consolidated its fundamental focus on academics. It also made national headlines when he extended an invitation to then-President of Pakistan, Ayub Khan, who declined citing 'security reasons'. This was the first of many subsequent refusals from high-ranking officials to visit East Pakistan.

=== Students from 1921 to 1948 ===
There were few students in the early years of the University of Dhaka. Enrolment in the first few years is shown in the table below:

Session	Number of Muslim students	Number of total students
1929–30	427	1300 (Except the training college and Medical Schools)
1930–31	399	1300
1930–34		1027
1934–35		933 (Including 39 female students)
1937–38	595	1527
1939–40	673	1527
1940–41	600	1633
1945–46		1000 (Including 90 female students)
1946–47		1092 (Including 100 female students)
1947–48		1693 (Including 72 female students)

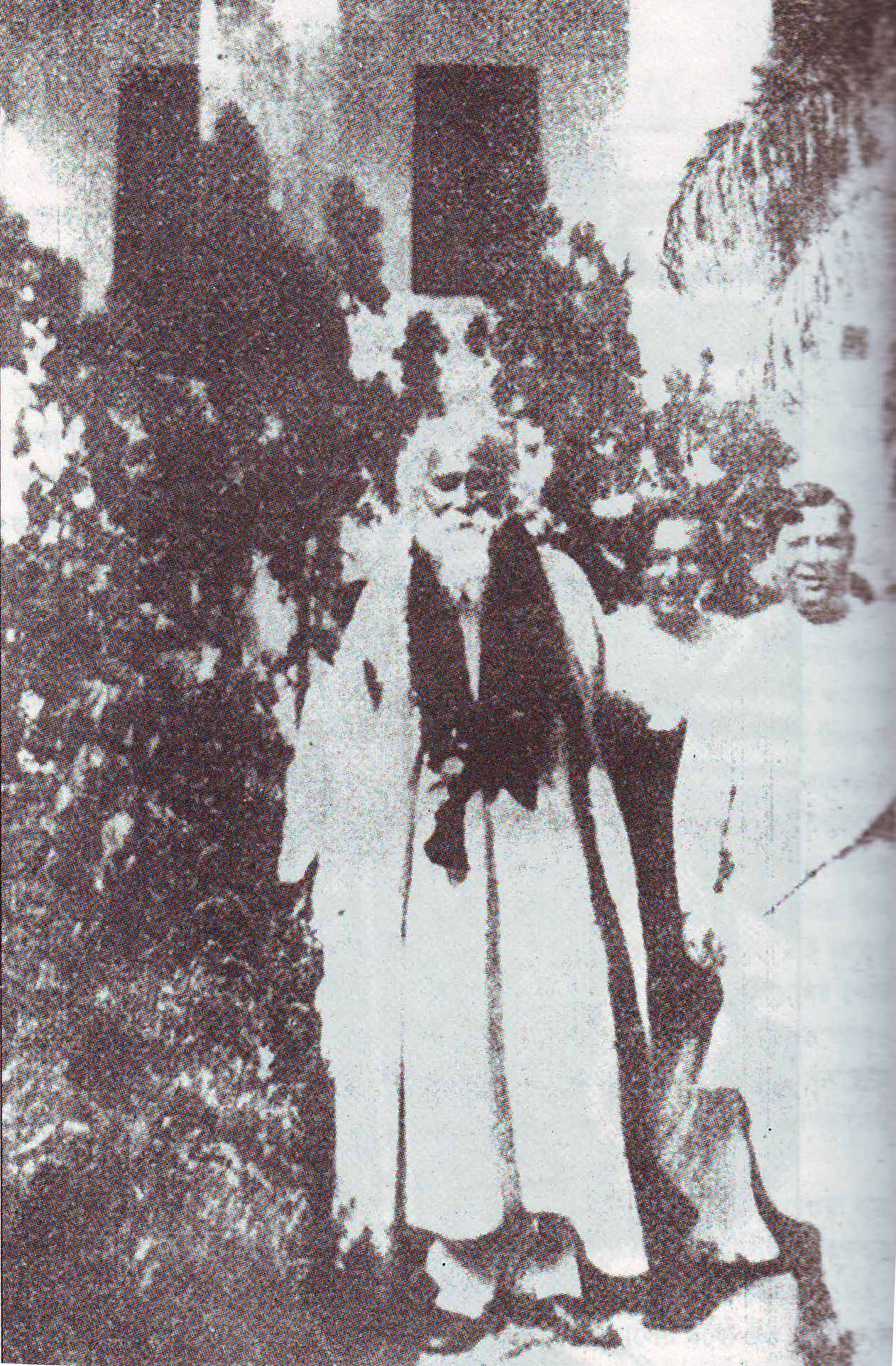
Rabindranath Tagore in Jagannath Hall

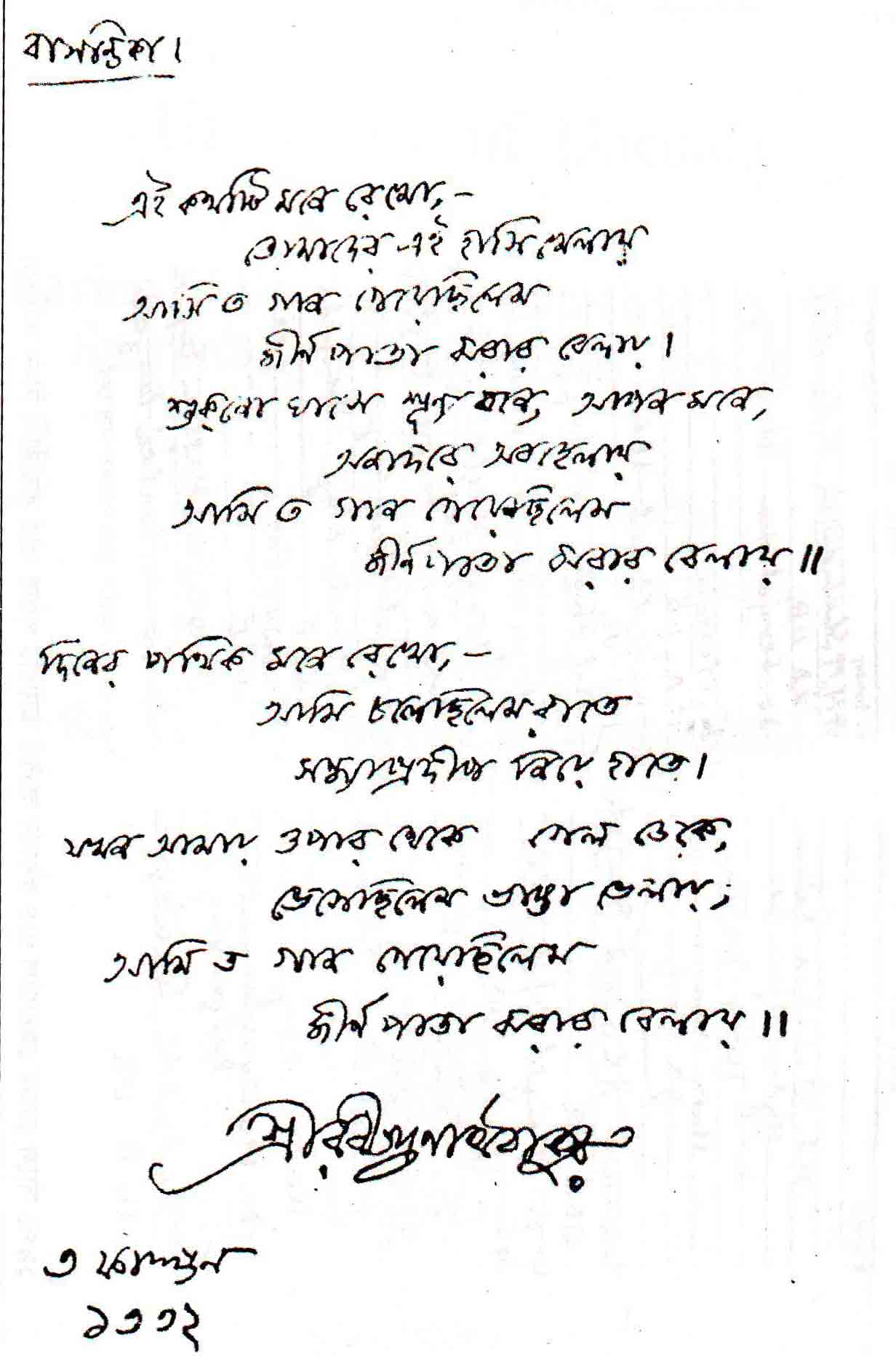
A poem written by Rabindranath Tagore for a magazine of Jagannath Hall

== University of Dhaka in the Liberation war (1970s) ==
=== Teachers who were killed in 1971 ===
Students and teachers of the University of Dhaka played a vital role in the 1971 Liberation War of Bangladesh. The Ordinance of 1961 was annulled and substituted by the Dacca University Order of 1973., The new Order restored autonomy, and provided a democratic atmosphere for the teachers and students where they could engage freely in academic and intellectual pursuits.

Teachers at the University of Dhaka who were killed during the liberation war include:

Name of Teacher	Institution
Dr. Mohammad Mortuza	Chief medical officer of the university
Giasuddin Ahmed	University of Dhaka
Dr. ANM Muniruzzaman	University of Dhaka
Dr. Jyotirmoy Guha Thakurta	University of Dhaka
AN Munir Chowdhury	University of Dhaka
Mofazzal Haider Chowdhury	University of Dhaka
Dr. Abul Khair	University of Dhaka
Dr. Serajul Hoque Khan	University of Dhaka
Rashidul Hasan	University of Dhaka
Anwar Pasha	University of Dhaka
Dr. GC Dev	University of Dhaka
Dr. Fazlur Rahman	University of Dhaka
Dr. Faizul Mohi	University of Dhaka
Abdul Muktadir	University of Dhaka
Sarafat Ali	University of Dhaka
Sadat Ali	University of Dhaka
AR Khan Khadim	University of Dhaka
Santosh C Bhattacharya	University of Dhaka
Mohammad Sadeq	University Laboratory School
Anudippayan Bhattachariya	University of Dhaka
