= Abdul Mannan (Rajshahi politician) =

Bangladeshi politician

Member of Bangladesh Parliament & Whip
- In office 1979–1986
- Succeeded by: Momtaz Uddin

Personal details
- Born: 1936 or 1937 (age 88–89) Chalk-Goash, Tomaltola, Bagatipara, Natore
- Died: 1986 Green Road,Dhaka
- Party: Bangladesh Nationalist Party

Abdul Mannan (Bengali: আব্দুল মান্নান) is a Bangladesh Nationalist Party politician and a former member of parliament for Rajshahi-15.( Now Natore-1), Also he was government party's whip of 2nd Parliament.

== Career ==
Mannan was elected to parliament from Rajshahi-15 ( Natore-1) as a Bangladesh Nationalist Party candidate in 1979. Selected as government party's whip of 2nd Parliament.
