= Emajuddin Ahamed =

Bangladeshi educationist (1933–2020)

- এমাজউদ্দিন আহমদ
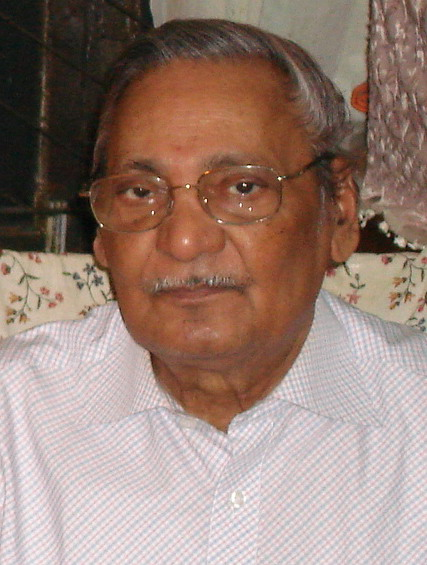
- Ahamed in December 2008

Vice-Chancellor of the University of Dhaka
- In office 1 November 1992 – 31 August 1996
- Preceded by: Mohammad Moniruzzaman Miah
- Succeeded by: Abul Kalam Azad Chowdhury

Vice-Chancellor of University of Development Alternative
- In office 2002–2016
- Succeeded by: Rafiqul Islam Sharif

President of Asiatic Society of Bangladesh
- In office 2004–2007
- Preceded by: Abdul Momin Chowdhury
- Succeeded by: Sirajul Islam

Personal details
- Born: 15 December 1933 Malda, Bengal Presidency, British India
- Died: 17 July 2020 (aged 86) Dhaka, Bangladesh
- Spouse: Begum Selima Ahamed
- Education: Rajshahi College; Dhaka University; Queen's University
- Occupation: Educationist
- Awards: full list

Emajuddin Ahamed (15 December 1933 – 17 July 2020) was a Bangladeshi political scientist, author and educationist. He served as the 21st vice-chancellor of the University of Dhaka during 1992–1996. He was awarded Ekushey Padak in 1992 by the Government of Bangladesh in the education category.

== Early life and education ==
Ahamed was born in Malda district in West Bengal in the then British India. He later moved to the Chapai Nawabganj District in Bangladesh with his family. Ahamed received his early education in Rajshahi. He got his bachelor's degree from Rajshahi College. He then joined the civil service as a lecturer of a government college. He became the principal of the college. In the mid-1970s, he was granted a scholarship by the Queen's University in Ontario, Canada when he earned a PhD degree for his research in political science.

== Career ==
In his professional life, he chose the teaching profession. His teaching career began at the college level. Initially, he joined Prafulla Chandra (P.C.) College in Bagerhat as a lecturer. Later, he served as the principal of Nilphamari College, Chuadanga College, and Rangpur College. In 1970, he joined the Department of Political Science at the University of Dhaka as a senior lecturer.

Ahamed served two terms as the pro-vice chancellor before becoming the vice chancellor of Dhaka University in 1992. He retired in 1996. He became the vice-chancellor of the University of Development Alternative in 2002. He also worked with the Asiatic Society of Bangladesh.

Ahamed was awarded the Ekushey Padak in 1992 for his contribution to education.

Political scientist Mubashar Hasan described Emajuddin as a supporter of President Ziaur Rahman. According to Hasan, Emajuddin criticized the Awami League's Bengali nationalism for excluding non-Bengali residents of Bangladesh, and believed the Bangladesh Nationalist Party intentionally crafted their Bangladeshi nationalism to include all people living in Bangladesh.

== Personal life ==
Emajuddin Ahamed was married to Begum Selima Ahamed. The couple had five children, three daughters and two sons, and eleven grandchildren. Their youngest daughter died in 1997. He is the father of Dil Rowshan Zinnat Ara Nazneen, Professor of Political Science at the University of Dhaka, Bangladesh and Tanwir Iqbal Ibn Ahamed, Associate Professor of Respiratory Medicine and grandfather of Tarnima Warda Andalib, Post Doctoral Researcher at University Sains Malaysia, Malaysia.

== Awards ==
Ahamed received several academic awards. The most specific ones are: Ekushey Padak in 1992. Mahakal Krishti Chinta Shangha Gold Medal, Jatiya Shahitya Sangshad Gold Medal, Zia Sangskritik Gold Medal, Michael Madhushudan Datta Gold Medal, Dhaka Shamajik ebong Shangskritik Gold Medal, Bangladesh Jubok Front Gold Medal, Rajshahi Forum Unnoyon Gold Medal.

== Death ==
Ahamed died on 17 July 2020 aged 86 at Lab Aid Hospital in Dhaka due to cardiac arrest.
