= Momtazur Rahman Tarafdar =

Bangladesh scholar and historian

Momtazur Rahman Tarafdar (Bengali: মমতাজুর রহমান তরফদার; 1928–1997) was a Bangladeshi historian and academic.

== Early life ==
Tarafdar was born on 1 August 1928 to a Bengali Muslim family in Meghagacha, Bogra District, Bengal Presidency. After completing his education at Bogra's Azizul Haque College, he enrolled at the University of Dacca in 1947. He completed his Bachelor of Arts from the university in 1949, and undertook his Master of Arts in Islamic history and culture, which was completed in 1951. In the same subject and university, he completed his PhD in 1961.

== Career ==
Tarafdar's first job was at Haraganga College in Munshiganj as a lecturer in 1952. He joined the University of Dhaka in 1953 as a lecturer, where he worked till his death. He had a fellowship at the Nuffield Foundation from 1972 to 1974. In 1997 he got a fellowship at Duke University and at the Bangla Academy and received the Bangla Academy Literary Award. His PhD thesis, Hussain Shahi Bengal, was published as a book. According to Banglapedia, the national encyclopedia of Bangladesh, the book is considered the most definitive work on the history of Bengal. It deals with the administration, art, architecture, economy, literature, and religion of Bengal. He wrote about the Hussain Shahi dynasty. He studied the relationship between Hindi and Bengali medieval poetry. In his essay The Cultural Identity of Bengali Muslims as Reflected in Medieval Bengali Literature, he wrote about the arrival of Islam in Bengal and its influence on the people. He was a staunch secularist. He believed history should be divided into periods by economic activity. He was against his contemporaries who divided eras by the religion of those in power, i.e., Christian era, Muslim era, Hindu era, etc.

== Death ==
Tarafdar died on 31 July 1997.
