= A F M Yusuf Haider =

Bangladeshi academic and scientist

- আ ফ ম ইউসুফ হায়দার
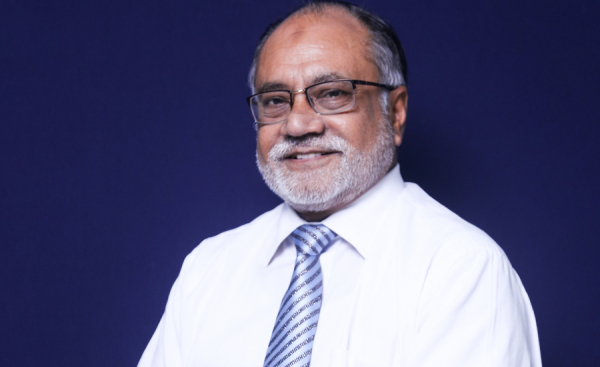
- Former vice-chancellor and pro vice-chancellor, University of Dhaka, Bangladesh

Pro Vice-Chancellor of the University of Dhaka
- In office 1 August 2002 – 24 January 2009
- Preceded by: Anwarullah Chowdhury
- Succeeded by: SMA Faiz

Personal details
- Education: Australian National University
- Occupation: University administrator, physicist

A F M Yusuf Haider is a Bangladeshi academic and scientist. Haider was appointed as the pro-vice-chancellor of the University of Dhaka for 6 years. He served as the 25th vice-chancellor (acting) of the university from 1 August 2002 until 23 September 2002. He is currently serving as professor emeritus at the Department of Physics, University of Dhaka.

== Education ==
Haider completed his bachelor's and master's in nuclear physics from the University of Dhaka in 1969 and 1970, respectively. He earned his Ph.D. from Australian National University in 1984.

== Career ==
Haider served as the pro-vice-chancellor of the University of Dhaka from 25 July 2002 until 23 January 2009.
