= Mohammad Moniruzzaman Miah =

- মোহাম্মদ মনিরুজ্জামান মিঞা

Ambassador of Bangladesh to Senegal
- In office 31 October 1992 – 1992

20th Vice Chancellor of University of Dhaka
- In office 24 March 1990 – 31 October 1992
- Preceded by: Abdul Mannan
- Succeeded by: Emajuddin Ahamed

Personal details
- Born: c. 1935 Murshidabad, Bengal Presidency, British India
- Died: June 13, 2016 (aged 80–81) Dhaka, Bangladesh
- Resting place: Banani, Dhaka
- Education: University of Rajshahi
- Occupation: Academic

Mohammad Moniruzzaman Miah (c. 1935 – June 13, 2016) was a Bangladeshi academic. He served as the 20th vice-chancellor of the University of Dhaka from March 1990 until October 1992. He was awarded Ekushey Padak in 2004 by the Government of Bangladesh for his contribution to education.

== Education and career ==
Miah completed his master's from the University of Rajshahi. He then joined as a faculty member of Jagannath College. After completing 5 years of studies in France, he joined the University of Dhaka as a professor of the Department of Geography and Environment. In 1990, he was appointed the vice-chancellor of the University of Dhaka.

On 31 October 1992, Miah was selected as the Bangladeshi Ambassador to Senegal.
