= Abul Kalam Azad Chowdhury =

Bangladeshi academic

Chairman of University Grants Commission
- In office 8 May 2011 – 7 May 2015
- President: Zillur Rahman
- Preceded by: Nazrul Islam
- Succeeded by: Abdul Mannan

24th Vice Chancellor of Dhaka University
- In office 30 September 1996 – 11 November 2001
- Preceded by: Shahid Uddin Ahmed
- Succeeded by: Anwarullah Chowdhury

Personal details
- Born: 21 October 1946 (age 79)
- Education: University of Dhaka
- Occupation: University academic, professor, administrator

Abul Kalam Azad Chowdhury (also AK Azad Chowdhury; born 21 October 1946) is a Bangladeshi academic. He served as the 23rd vice-chancellor of the University of Dhaka and the 11th chairman of the University Grants Commission of Bangladesh.

== Education and career ==
Chowdhury was born on 21 October 1946 to Siddiqur Rahman Chowdhury and Anwara Begum Chowdhury. He completed his bachelor's and master's in biochemistry from the University of Dhaka in 1967 and 1968, respectively. He obtained his Ph.D. in pharmacy from the University of Manchester in 1976.

Chowdhury was a member of the Drug Policy Committee of Harvard University, National Professor of Canam University of Paris, and visiting professor at Nottingham University, UK.

He was the president of the Bangladesh Academy of Sciences from 2019 to 2025.

== Achievements ==
In 2018, Chowdhury was included in the Queen's New Year's Honours list, receiving an MBE for services to education in Bangladesh.
