= University Grants Commission of Bangladesh =

Bangladeshi government university authority

- বাংলাদেশ বিশ্ববিদ্যালয় মঞ্জুরী কমিশন
- Crest of University Grants Commission of Bangladesh (UGC)

Commission overview
- Formed: 1973; 53 years ago
- Jurisdiction: Government of Bangladesh
- Headquarters: UGC Bhaban, Plot# E-18/A, Agargaon, Sher-e-Bangla Nagar, Dhaka, Bangladesh; 23.7802°N 90.3738°E
- Employees: 350
- Annual budget: ৳5500 crore (US$450 million) (2024-2025)
- Commission executive: Mamun Ahmed, Chairman
- Parent department: Ministry of Education
- Website: ugc.gov.bd

University Grants Commission of Bangladesh (Bengali: বাংলাদেশ বিশ্ববিদ্যালয় মঞ্জুরী কমিশন, romanized: Bañglādeś Biśbobidyālaẏ mañjurī komiśan; abbreviated as UGC) is the apex body responsible for overseeing higher education in Bangladesh, ensuring quality standards, and advising on university development. It was established on 16 December 1972, according to the Presidential Order (P.O. No 10 of 1973) of the Government of People's Republic of Bangladesh. It regulates public and private universities, promoting academic excellence and supporting research initiatives across the country.

== History ==
In 2010, the Government of Bangladesh announced reform in the UGC, deciding to change UGC into Higher Education Commission of Bangladesh (HEC), which would supposedly develop, expand and enhance the quality of tertiary education in the country.

== Purpose ==
The UGC is the apex body of all the affiliated public, private and international universities of Bangladesh.

It provides funds for "Government Funded Universities" of Bangladesh. Its mission is to ensure the quality of higher education throughout the country. Private universities must obtain permission from UGC before they are eligible to operate. UGC was designed to maintain the autonomous nature of the universities. The underlying principle is that the government should not engage directly with universities, either individually or collectively; rather, it should interact through the UGC, which in turn liaises directly with the universities. UGC offers scholarships to outstanding students, funds research, and organizes seminars.

== Administrative structure ==
BUGC consists of the following members:

- Chairman: Mamun Ahmed
- Full-time members: 5
- Part-time members: 6
- Vice-Chancellors: 2 (by rotation)
- Professors of Universities: 3 (from the universities Vice-Chancellors of which are not members)
- Government nominees: 3 (Secretary, Minister of education, a member of the Planning Commission)
- Representative of the Ministry of Finance: 1 (not below the rank of a secretary)

Former Chairmen of the Commission
Name	Term length	Years of service
Dr. Muzaffar Ahmed Chowdhury	13 April 1973 – 25 January 1975	1 year, 9 months
Dr. ABM Habibullah	12 February 1975 – 5 July 1977	2 years, 5 months
Dr. M A Naser	6 July 1977 – 17 February 1981	3 years, 7 months
Dr. M. A. Bari	18 February 1981 – 17 February 1989	8 years
Syed Ali Ahsan	2 March 1989 – 18 December 1990	1 year, 9 months
Dr. M Shamsul Huq	19 March 1991 – 18 March 1995	4 years
Dr. Iajuddin Ahmed	8 April 1995 – 7 April 1999	4 years
Dr. A. T. M. Zahurul Huq	8 April 1999 – 7 April 2003	4 years
Dr. Mohammad Asaduzzaman	16 April 2003 – 15 April 2007	4 years
Nazrul Islam	7 May 2007 – 6 May 2011	4 years
Dr. A K Azad Chowdhury	8 May 2011 – 7 May 2015	4 years
Abdul Mannan	7 May 2015 – 7 May 2019	4 years
Kazi Shahidullah	22 May 2019 – 11 August 2024	5 years, 3 months
Syed Muhammed Abul Faiz	5 September 2024 - 16 March 2026	
Mamun Ahmed	16 March 2026 – present	

== Divisions ==
- Administrative Division
- Planning and Development Division
- Information Management, Communication and Training Division
- Finance and Accounts Division
- Private Universities Division
- Public Universities Division
- Research and Publication Division
- Strategic Planning, Quality Assurance and Right to Information Division
- Institute of Scientific Instrumentation (ISI) is a subsidiary organ of the University Grants Commission of Bangladesh.

== Registered Universities ==
There are 60 Public Universities, 116 Private Universities, 3 International Universities, and 2 special universities registered under UGC, Bangladesh.

== Academic Transformation Fund ==
The Academic Transformation Fund (ATF) is a component of the Higher Education Acceleration and Transformation (HEAT) Project that provides competitive grants to support research, institutional development, and quality enhancement in higher education. The project aims to improve the quality of higher education, modernize digital campus infrastructure, enhance graduate employability, and increase women's participation and leadership in higher education.

According to the Academic Transformation Fund Operational Manual, universities are grouped into Category A, Category B, and Category C based on the number of full-time academic staff holding PhD degrees and research publications indexed in Scopus. Category A includes the University of Dhaka, Bangladesh University of Engineering and Technology, University of Chittagong, North South University, Daffodil International University, BRAC University, and other universities.

== See also ==
- Education in Bangladesh
- List of universities in Bangladesh
- List of schools in Bangladesh
- List of colleges in Bangladesh
- List of institutes in Bangladesh
- List of medical colleges in Bangladesh
- List of dental schools in Bangladesh
- Textile schools in Bangladesh
- List of architecture schools in Bangladesh
