= Abdul Mannan (academic) =

19th Vice Chancellor of the University of Dhaka
- In office 12 January 1986 – 22 March 1990
- Preceded by: Md. Shamsul Huq
- Succeeded by: Mohammad Moniruzzaman Miah

Personal details
- Born: 1 January 1932 Narsingdi, Bengal Presidency, British India
- Died: 30 April 2007 (aged 75) Dhaka, Bangladesh
- Occupation: university academic

Abdul Mannan (1 January 1932 – 30 April 2007) was a Bangladeshi academic. He served as the 19th Vice-chancellor of the University of Dhaka.

== Education and career ==
Mannan earned his master's in biochemistry from the University of Dhaka in 1955. In 1961, he joined the Department of Biochemistry as a lecturer and moved to the Department of Pharmacy in 1983.

Mannan was elected to serve as the Vice-Chancellor of the University of Dhaka from January 1986 until March 1990.
