= Bangladesh–South Korea relations =

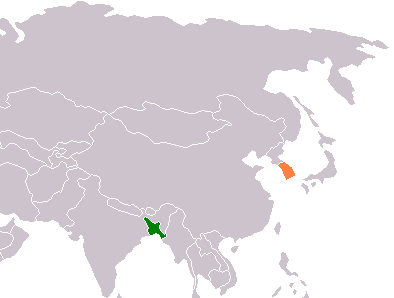

- Bangladesh: South Korea

Diplomatic mission
- Embassy of Bangladesh, Seoul: Embassy of South Korea, Dhaka

Envoy
- Bangladeshi Ambassador to South Korea Md Delwar Hossain: South Korean Ambassador to Bangladesh Lee Jang-keun

Bangladesh–South Korea relations (Bengali: বাংলাদেশ-দক্ষিণ কোরিয়া সম্পর্ক; Korean: 방글라데시-대한민국 관계) are the diplomatic and bilateral relations between the countries of Bangladesh and South Korea. In 1974, South Korea opened its embassy in Dhaka, with Bangladesh opening its embassy in Seoul in 1987.

== History ==
The Republic of Korea and Bangladesh established formal diplomatic relations on 18 December 1973, following South Korea's official recognition of Bangladesh on 12 May 1972. South Korea opened a resident mission in Dhaka on 1 March 1975, and Bangladesh established its embassy in Seoul on 16 February 1987.

In 2008, the Ministry of Justice of South Korea ceased the protocol of visa exemption. It was decided that because the number of temporary residents from Bangladesh reached over 13,000 throughout South Korea, both nations should get permission from each country to enter from 15 July 2008 onwards.

In South Korea, there are more than 13,000 Bangladeshi foreign workers in the country. A significant number of them are temporary immigrants. This has led to prejudice towards Bangladeshi expatriates, an issue tackled by the 2009 South Korean film Bandhobi, directed by Sin Dong-il.

The year 2023 marked the 50th anniversary of bilateral ties, and various events were organized by the South Korean Embassy, KOTRA, the Korea–Bangladesh Chamber of Commerce and Industry (KBCCI), and other organizations to commemorate the occasion. South Korea has been expanding strategic investments in sectors such as infrastructure, energy, and consumer goods, while the Bangladeshi government has been exploring the possibility of concluding an Economic Partnership Agreement (EPA) with South Korea. The two countries also continue cooperation in multilateral forums, including the United Nations, through development partnerships and the sharing of norms.

To celebrate the 50th anniversary, the leaders of both nations exchanged official messages reaffirming their commitment to future cooperation. In December 2023, President Yoon Suk Yeol of South Korea and Prime Minister Sheikh Hasina of Bangladesh pledged to strengthen collaboration in areas such as climate change, science and technology, and defense.

== Economic relations ==
Economic cooperation began to expand early on, particularly with the entry of Korean companies into Bangladesh's ready-made garment (RMG) sector. In 1979, the collaboration between South Korea's Daewoo Group and Bangladesh's Desh Garments is widely regarded as a key catalyst for the growth of Bangladesh's garment industry. Since then, bilateral trade has steadily increased, reaching the 3-billion-dollar range as of 2022. In Chattogram, the Korean Export Processing Zone (KEPZ), developed with Korean participation, has created approximately 70,000 jobs and generates significant annual export value.

== Cultural relations ==
Cultural exchange between South Korea and Bangladesh has also been active. Institutions such as the Korean Cultural Centers in Dhaka have promoted interest in Korean culture by introducing K-pop, Korean cuisine, and traditional arts. In 2023, marking the 50th anniversary of diplomatic relations, "Korea Week 2023" was held, featuring a wide range of programs including pop-culture events and business exhibitions.

== Bangladeshi community in South Korea ==
Approximately 25,000 Bangladeshi nationals reside in South Korea, including around 3,500 students. Most Bangladeshi students pursue studies in science and engineering fields. In the labor sector, Bangladeshi workers typically enter the country as low- to mid-skilled employees through the Employment Permit System (EPS). Since 2008, the number of Bangladeshi workers who have come to South Korea through the EPS has reached about 31,249 as of 2023.

Bangladeshi workers in South Korea can earn between 2,000 and US$3,000 per month, including overtime pay, in addition to their base salary. They are also eligible to enroll in social insurance programs such as industrial accident insurance, health insurance, and the national pension scheme.

The Bangladeshi community in South Korea operates educational institutions such as Bangladeshi community schools, where children receive instruction in Bengali language, Bangladeshi culture, and religious education. The community also engages actively in cultural events, seminars, and other activities in cooperation with the Embassy of Bangladesh in Seoul.

The South Korean government has announced plans to expand the annual EPS quota to around 10,000, signaling continued support for the future inflow of Bangladeshi workers.

== List of ambassadors of Bangladesh to South Korea ==
List of Ambassadors
| Sl. No. | Name | From | To | Ref |
|---|---|---|---|---|
| 1 | S. A. Mahmood | 17 April 1987 | 13 March 1989 | |
| 2 | Kazi Anwarul Masud | 14 August 1989 | 7 March 1993 | |
| 3 | A. K. Md Fazlur Rahman | 1 September 1993 | 7 July 1997 | |
| 4 | Md. Ataur Rahman Khan Kaiser | 18 December 1997 | 17 July 1999 | |
| 5 | Iftikharul Karim | 18 March 2000 | 30 June 2002 | |
| 6 | Humayun A. Kamal | 29 July 2002 | 8 January 2004 | |
| 7 | A. M. Mahmuduzzaman | 17 February 2004 | 31 July 2005 | |
| 8 | Mustafa Kamal | 12 August 2005 | 28 January 2008 | |
| 9 | Shahidul Islam | 7 February 2008 | 18 July 2012 | |
| 10 | Md. Enamul Kabir | 11 August 2012 | 31 December 2014 | |
| 11 | Md. Zulfiqur Rahman | 23 May 2015 | 13 December 2017 | |
| 12 | Abida Islam | 21 December 2017 | 21 August 2021 | |
| 13 | M. Delwar Hossain | 1 October 2021 | 18 December 2024 | |
| 14 | Toufiq Islam Shatil | 28 February 2025 | | |

== See also ==
- Foreign relations of Bangladesh
- Foreign relations of South Korea
- Buddhism in Bangladesh
- Christianity in Bangladesh
- Islam in Korea
- Hinduism in Korea
