= List of high commissioners of Bangladesh to the United Kingdom =

High Commissioner of Bangladesh to the United Kingdom
- যুক্তরাজ্য নিযুক্ত বাংলাদেশের হাইকমিশনার
- National emblem of Bangladesh

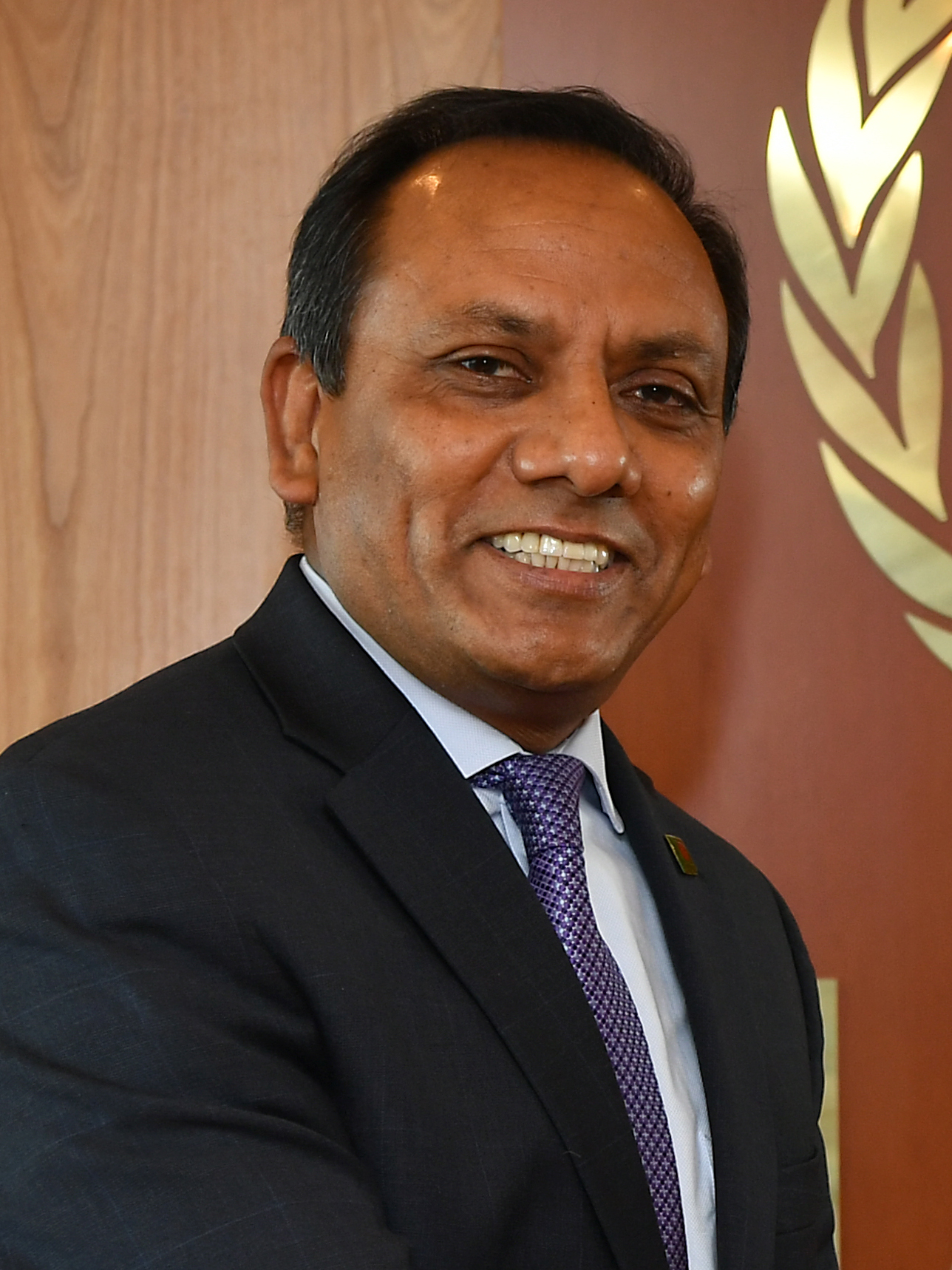
- Incumbent; Muhammad Abdul Muhith since 24 August 2026
- Ministry of Foreign Affairs
- Style: The Honourable (formal); Mr. or Madam High Commissioner (informal); His Excellency (diplomatic)
- Reports to: Minister of Foreign Affairs
- Residence: London, United Kingdom
- Seat: High Commission of Bangladesh, London
- Nominator: The government of Bangladesh
- Appointer: The president of Bangladesh; on the advice of the; chief adviser
- Inaugural holder: Syed Abdus Sultan
- Formation: 1972; 54 years ago
- Salary: ৳300000 (US$2,400) per month (incl. allowances)
- Website: Official website

The high commissioner of Bangladesh to the United Kingdom is the chief diplomatic representative of Bangladesh to the United Kingdom.

== List of high commissioners of Bangladesh to the United Kingdom ==
- Muhammad Abdul Muhith (24 August 2026 - Present)
- Abida Islam (27 January 2025 – 8 March 2026)
- Saida Muna Tasneem (30 November 2018 – 29 September 2024)
- Md. Nazmul Quaunine (September 2016 – 29 November 2018)
- Ismat Jahan (April 2016 – September 2016)
- Md Abdul Hannan (February 2015 – April 2016)
- Mohamed Mijarul Quayes (9 December 2012 – July 2014)
- M. Sayeedur Rahman Khan (2009–2012)
- Shafi U Ahmed (2007–2009)
- AHM Mofazzal Karim (2003 – 2007)
- Abul Hassan Mahmood Ali (1996 – 2001)
- Rezaul Karim (?–1992)
- Mir Shawkat Ali (27 July 1986 – 30 July 1987)
- Fakhruddin Ahmed (May 1982 – July 1986)
- Abul Fateh (1976–1977)
- Syed Abdus Sultan (1972–1976)

== See also ==
- List of ambassadors of Bangladesh to the United States
- List of high commissioners of Bangladesh to Canada
- List of ambassadors of Bangladesh to Kingdom of Saudi Arabia
- List of high commissioners of Bangladesh to Pakistan
- List of high commissioners of Bangladesh to India
