= Abdul Halim (Dinajpur politician) =

Bangladeshi politician

- আবদুল হালিম

Member of the Bangladesh Parliament for Dinajpur-4
- In office 15 February 1996 – 12 June 1996
- Preceded by: Mizanur Rahman Manu
- Succeeded by: Mizanur Rahman Manu

Personal details
- Born: Dinajpur District
- Party: Bangladesh Nationalist Party

Abdul Halim Bangladesh Nationalist Party politician. He was elected member of parliament for Dinajpur-4 in February 1996.

== Career ==
Abdul is a lawyer and a member of Dinajpur district BNP. He was elected to parliament from Dinajpur-4 as a Bangladesh Nationalist Party candidate in 15 February 1996 Bangladeshi general election. He was defeated from Dinajpur-4 constituency on 12 June 1996 on the nomination of Bangladesh Nationalist Party.
