= Tareq Ahmed =

Tareq Ahmed may refer to:

- Tareq Ahmed (footballer)
- Tareq Ahmed (diplomat)
