= AHM Mofazzal Karim =

Bangladeshi civil servant, diplomat and author

A H Mofazzal Karim

High Commissioner of Bangladesh to the United Kingdom
- In office 2003–2007
- Preceded by: Abul Hassan Mahmood Ali
- Succeeded by: Shafi U Ahmed

Personal details
- Born: 6 August 1941 (age 85) Sylhet District, Assam Province, British India
- Education: University of Dhaka
- Occupation: Bureaucrat, diplomat, writer

A H Mofazzal Karim (born 6 August 1941) is a retired Bangladeshi civil servant, diplomat, and author. He served as Secretary to the Government of Bangladesh and as High Commissioner of Bangladesh to the United Kingdom and Ireland.

== Early life and education ==
Karim was born on 6 August 1941 in present-day Kulaura Upazila, Moulvibazar District, Bangladesh. He completed his Bachelor's and master's degrees in English from the University of Dhaka.

== Career ==
Karim began his professional life as a lecturer in English at MC College in Sylhet. In 1966, he joined the Civil Service of Pakistan.

During his tenure in public service, Karim held various senior positions, including serving as Secretary to the Government of the People's Republic of Bangladesh. He had served as the Secretary of the Ministry of Commerce (twice), Ministry of Fisheries and Livestock, and Ministry of Shipping.

Karim retired from government service in 1999. He joined the Bangladesh Nationalist Party and was appointed to the Council of Advisors to the chairperson of the Bangladesh Nationalist Party Khaleda Zia. He was appointed the High Commissioner of Bangladesh to the United Kingdom and Ireland in October 2003. Minister of Foreign Affairs M Morshed Khan denied Karim was recalled from the United Kingdom in July 2005 following tensions with foreign diplomats, known as the Tuesday Club, in Dhaka over the upcoming 2006 parliamentary elections.

Karim is also a prolific writer. He has authored 24 books, spanning both prose and poetry. He supported the reformist faction of the Bangladesh Nationalist Party, led by M Saifur Rahman, during the 2006-2008 Bangladesh political crisis. In September 2008, Kulaura Upazila unit of the Bangladesh Nationalist Party expelled him and fellow pro-reform leader MM Shahin.

Karim is a member of the Jalalabad Association, Dhaka.
