= Saida Muna Tasneem =

High Commissioner of Bangladesh to the United Kingdom (2018–24)

- সাঈদা মুনা তাসনিম
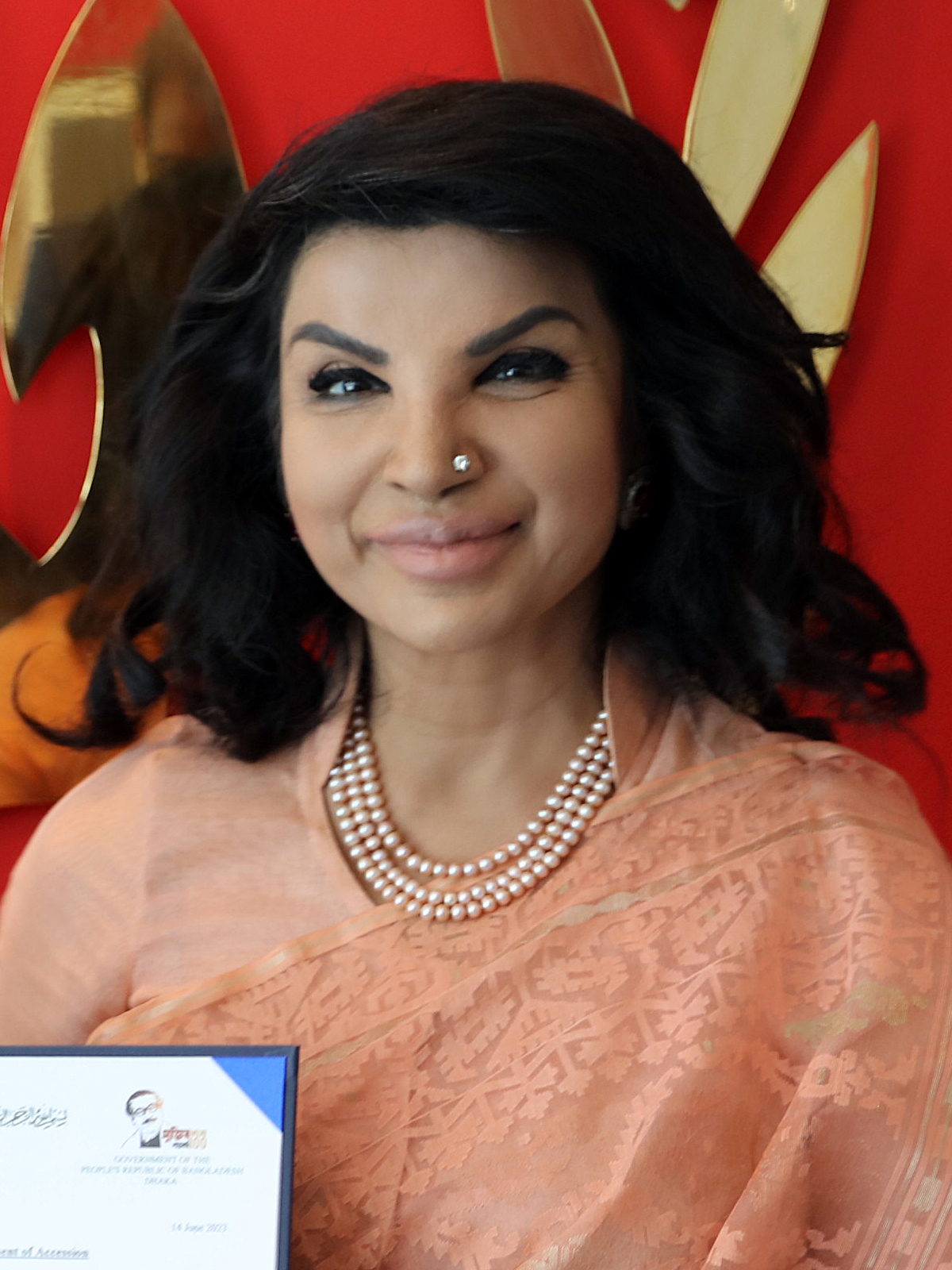
- Tasneem in 2019

Bangladesh High Commissioner to the United Kingdom
- In office 30 November 2018 – 29 September 2024
- President: Abdul Hamid; Mohammed Shahabuddin
- Prime Minister: Sheikh Hasina; Muhammad Yunus (acting)
- Preceded by: Md. Nazmul Quaunine
- Succeeded by: Abida Islam

Bangladesh Ambassador to Thailand and Cambodia
- In office 14 November 2014 – 23 October 2018
- President: Abdul Hamid
- Prime Minister: Sheikh Hasina
- Preceded by: Kazi Imtiaz Hossain
- Succeeded by: Md. Nazmul Quaunine

Personal details
- Born: Dhaka, East Pakistan
- Spouse: Tauhidul Chaudhury
- Education: SOAS University of London; Bangladesh University of Engineering and Technology
- Occupation: Diplomat

Saida Muna Tasneem is a Bangladeshi diplomat who served as high commissioner of Bangladesh to the United Kingdom and ambassador to Ireland and Liberia from November 2018 to September 2024. She is the first woman to hold these positions. She became the first vice-president of the International Maritime Organization (IMO) in January 2024. She was formerly the Ambassador to Thailand and Cambodia and Bangladesh's representative to the United Nations Economic and Social Commission for Asia and the Pacific.

== Background ==
Tasneem was born in Dhaka in the then East Pakistan. Her family moved to Beirut, Lebanon, in 1975 in order for her father to complete his PhD at the American University of Beirut. They later moved back to Dhaka in 1979, where Tasneem completed high school at the Holy Cross Girls' High School. She graduated from the Bangladesh University of Engineering and Technology (BUET) in 1988 with a bachelor's in chemical engineering. She later completed her master's in public policy and management at the School of Oriental and African Studies of the University of London.

== Career ==
Tasneem started her career at the Bangladesh Foreign Service in 1993.

The Bangladeshi Ministry of Foreign Affairs recalled Tasneem from her posting to Bangladesh's United Nations mission in June 2004.

=== Thailand and Cambodia ===
Tasneem was appointed as the ambassador to Thailand and Cambodia on 14 November 2014. She presented her credentials to then-Crown Prince Maha Vajiralongkorn, representing King Rama IX, on 4 September 2015.

As an ambassador, it was one of Tasneem's priorities to strengthen religious tourism between the two countries. Md Nazmul Quaunine took over for Tasneem as the high commissioner to Thailand on 23 October 2018.

=== The United Kingdom, Ireland, and Liberia ===
On 30 November 2018, Tasneem was appointed high commissioner to the United Kingdom and an ambassador to Ireland and Liberia, succeeding Md Nazmul Quaunine. She was the first woman appointed to the position.

On 1 May 2019, Tasneem attended a reception at Buckingham Palace, where she presented Quaunine's letter of recall and her letter of credence to Queen Elizabeth II. During the meeting, Tasneem wished the Queen good health and prosperity, and requested that two forests in Bangladesh (one of which being Lawachara National Park) be included under the Queen's Commonwealth Canopy. The Queen, in turn, praised Bangladesh's economic growth and empowerment of women.

On 21 November 2019, Tasneem met the Irish president, Michael D. Higgins, at the Áras an Uachtaráin in Dublin, Ireland. She thanked Higgins for his support of the Bangladeshi diaspora within Ireland. Higgins admired Prime Minister Sheikh Hasina's sheltering of 1.1 million Rohingya refugees. Tasneem also invited Higgins to open an Irish embassy in Dhaka and to frequently hold bilateral talks to improve relations.

=== United Nations ===
In 2014, Tasneem was appointed Bangladesh's permanent representative to the United Nations Economic and Social Commission for Asia and the Pacific (UNESCAP). There, in May 2016, she helped table a resolution based on Sheikh Hasina's blue economy policies. It was titled "Regional cooperation in Asia and the Pacific to promote the conservation and sustainable use of the oceans, seas and marine resources for sustainable development". Australia, India, and Sri Lanka co-sponsored it. After several rounds of negotiations, it passed unanimously.

Tasneem is also Bangladesh's representative to the International Maritime Organization.

== Awards ==
- On 23 February 2017, at a ceremony in Dhaka, Tasneem was awarded the Atish Dipankar Peace Gold Award from Deputy Speaker Fazle Rabbi Miah. She received the award in recognition of her work to promote interfaith dialogue and peace, particularly during her role as high commissioner to Thailand.
- Diplomat of the Year 2022 Award.
