= Kazi Anwarul Masud =

Ambassador of Bangladesh to South Korea
- In office 14 August 1989 – 7 March 1993
- Preceded by: S A Mahmood
- Succeeded by: A.K. Md Fazlur Rahman

Ambassador of Bangladesh to Thailand
- In office 11 July 1987 – 25 July 1989
- Preceded by: M. Mohsin
- Succeeded by: Moinul Hossain Chowdhury

Personal details
- Born: 14 October 1943 (age 82)
- Spouse: Salma Masud
- Education: University of Dhaka

Kazi Anwarul Masud (born 14 October 1943) is a retired Bangladeshi diplomat and secretary. He is the former ambassador of Bangladesh to Germany, South Korea, Thailand, and Vietnam.

== Early life ==
Masud was born on 14 October 1943. He studied economics at the University of Dhaka. He is married to Salma Masud.

== Career ==
Masud joined the Pakistan Civil Service on 26 December 1966. He was the second secretary at the Embassy of Pakistan in Yangon, Myanmar, in 1971. After the Independence of Bangladesh, he was appointed Charge d'Affaires of the Bangladesh Embassy to Myanmar. He was the first secretary of the Embassy of Bangladesh in France.

Masud was the Director General of the Europe and Americas Wing at the Ministry of Foreign Affairs in 1985. He was the deputy High Commissioner of Bangladesh to India. He then served as the Ambassador of Bangladesh to Thailand and the Permanent Representative of Bangladesh to the United Nations Economic and Social Commission for Asia and the Pacific.

Masud's book, Issues of Contemporary Politics, was published in 2007. Its launch was sponsored by the Bangladesh Institute of Law and International Affairs and attended by Faruque Choudhury, Rashed Khan Menon, Mohiuddin Ahmed, Mahbub Alam, Syed Moazzem Ali, and Waliur Rahman.
