= Akhtaruzzaman Mia =

Bangladeshi politician

- আখতারুজ্জামান মিয়া

Member of the Bangladesh Parliament for Dinajpur-4
- Incumbent
- Assumed office 17 February 2026
- Preceded by: Abul Hassan Mahmood Ali
- In office 28 October 2001 – 27 October 2006
- Preceded by: Mizanur Rahman Manu
- Succeeded by: Abul Hassan Mahmood Ali

Personal details
- Born: 12 February 1957 (age 69) Chirirbandar thana, Dinajpur District, East Pakistan, Pakistan
- Party: Bangladesh Nationalist Party
- Occupation: Politician, businessman

Akhtaruzzaman Mia (born 12 February 1957) is a Bangladeshi politician and businessman. He is a member of the Bangladesh Nationalist Party and the incumbent Jatiya Sangsad member representing the Dinajpur-4 constituency. He assumed office after the 2026 general election and currently serves as a whip in the Jatiya Sangsad.

== Early life and education ==
Mia was born on 12 February 1957 in South Palashpara village of Chirirbandar thana, Dinajpur District, East Pakistan (now Bangladesh). He completed his Bachelor of Commerce and master's degree in accounting and information systems at the University of Rajshahi in 1979.

== Political career ==
Mia was elected as a member of parliament from Dinajpur-4 as a candidate of the Bangladesh Nationalist Party in the 2001 Bangladeshi general election.

He contested the 2008 Bangladeshi general election as an independent candidate. In the 2018 Bangladeshi general election, he contested from Dinajpur-4 as a candidate supported by the Jatiya Oikya Front and the Bangladesh Nationalist Party but was defeated by Abul Hassan Mahmood Ali of the Awami League.

In the 2026 general election, Mia was elected again as the member of parliament for Dinajpur-4 and was appointed as one of the whips in the Jatiya Sangsad. In September 2026, he headed the newly formed Parliamentary Standing Committee on the Textiles and Jute Ministry.
