= Queen's Gate =

Street in South Kensington, London, England

Coordinates: 51°29′54″N 0°10′47″W

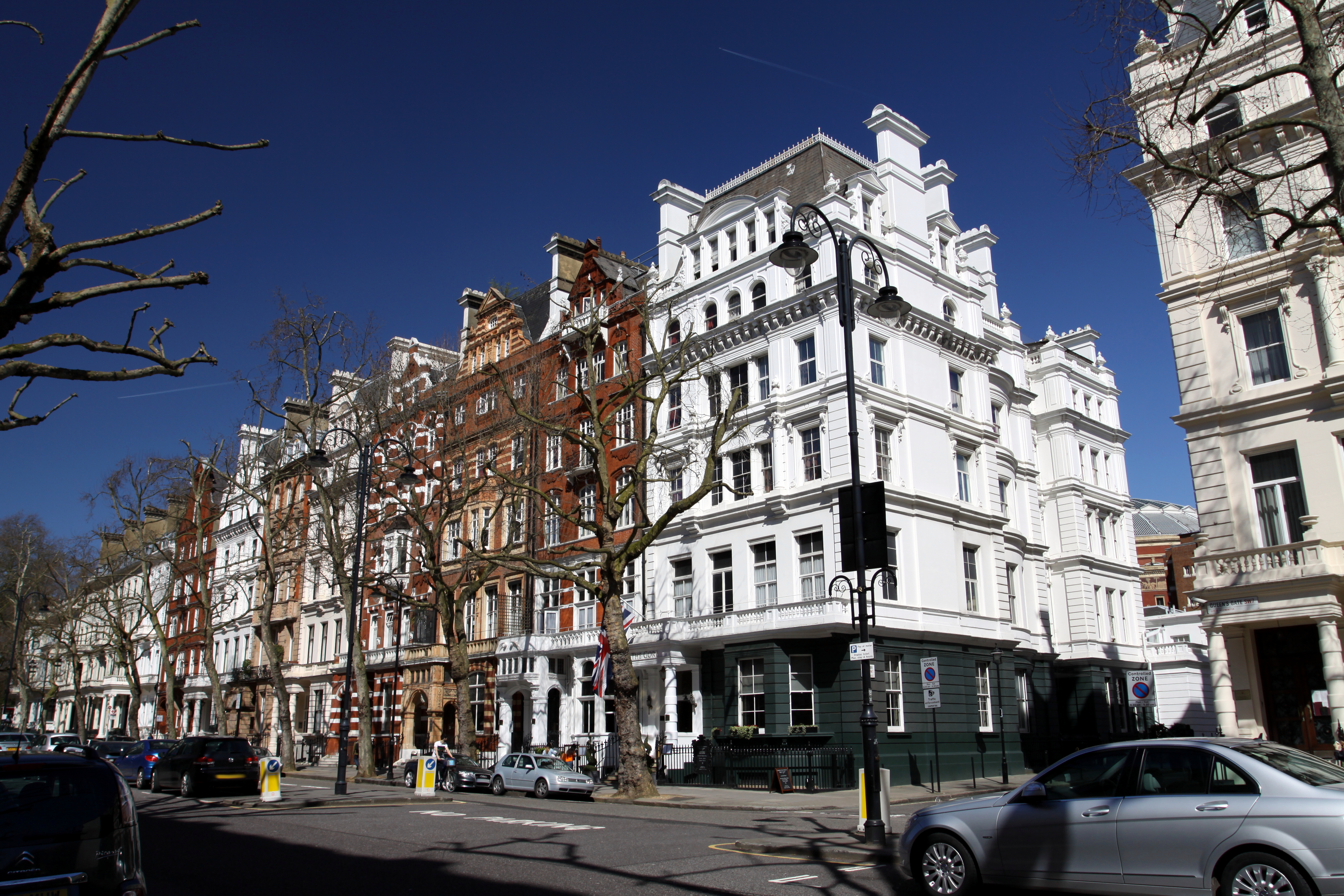
Buildings in the street.

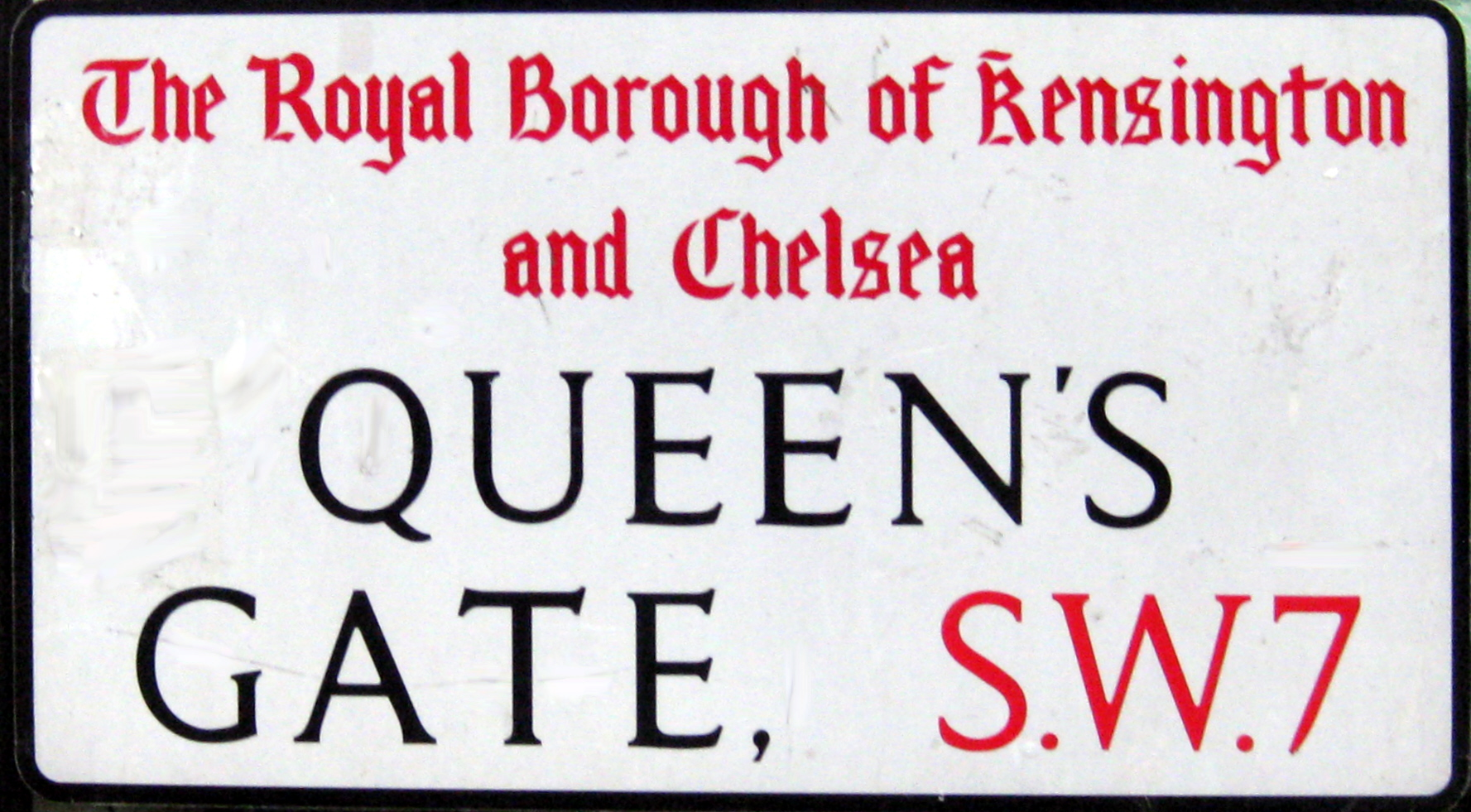
Street sign

Queen's Gate is a street in South Kensington, London, England. It runs south from Kensington Gardens' Queen's Gate (the edge of which gardens are here followed by Kensington Road) to Old Brompton Road, intersecting Cromwell Road.

The street is mostly in the Royal Borough of Kensington and Chelsea, but part of the east side is in the City of Westminster. The municipal boundary is the street centre between Kensington Road and Imperial College Road.

== History ==
The street was built on land purchased by the Royal Commissioners for the Great Exhibition under an agreement dated August 1855 with Henry Browne Alexander, whose family owned the land through which the road was to pass, and William Jackson, a building speculator. The road was originally known as Albert's Road, but was officially changed to Queen's Gate in 1859.

== Local Politics ==
Queen's Gate is a three-councillor ward of Royal Borough of Kensington and Chelsea with a population of 9,847 (2011 Census). Queen's Gate is part of the Kensington and Bayswater constituency for elections to the House of Commons of the United Kingdom, represented by Labour MP Joe Powell since 2024.

== Places of interest ==
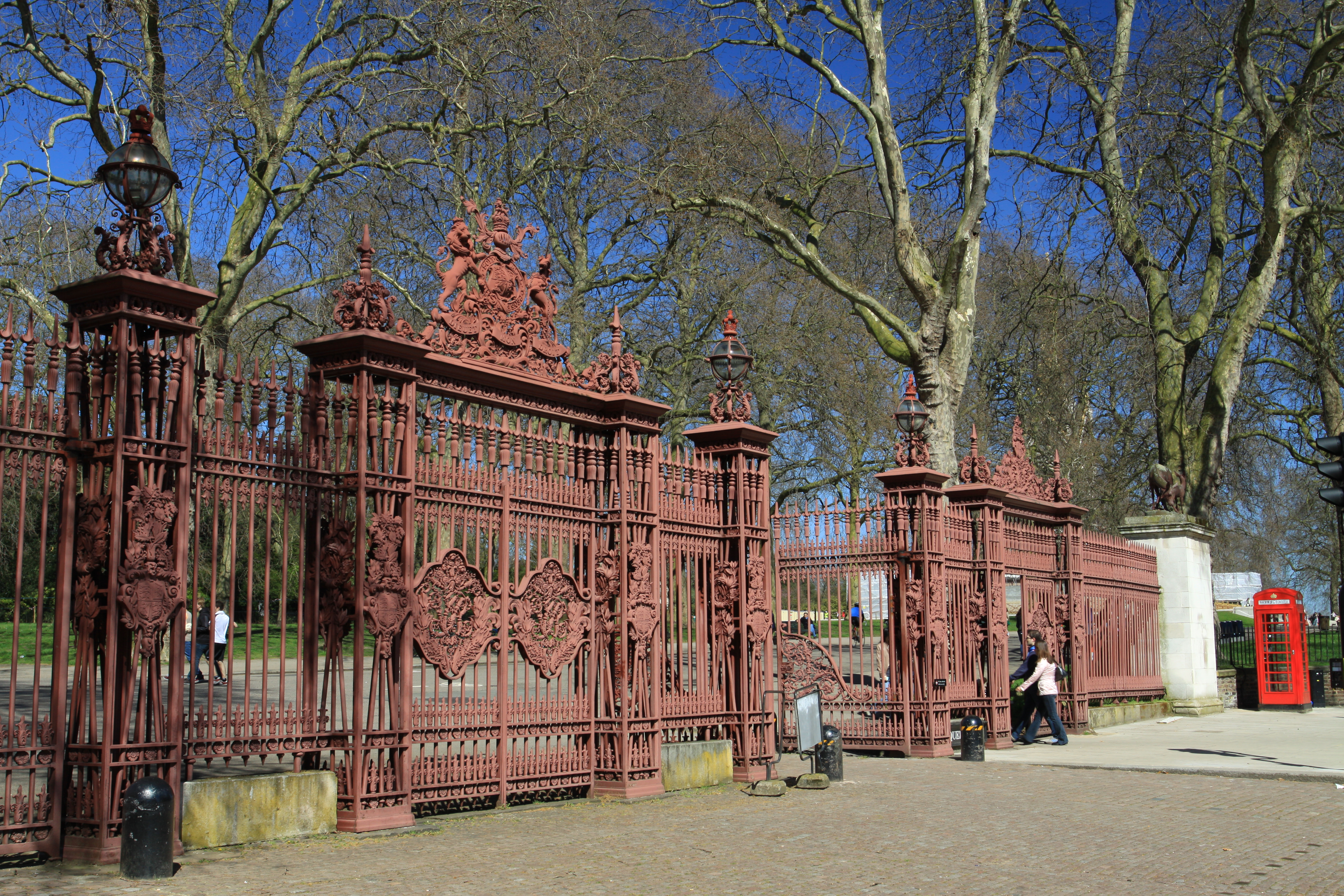
The Queen's Gate of Kensington Gardens

At the northern end of the road, near the actual gate to Kensington Gardens, is an equestrian statue of Field Marshal Robert Napier, 1st Baron Napier of Magdala, erected in 1920.

From north to south, places of interest visible on the east side of Queen's Gate include the Royal Albert Hall, the Huxley Building of Imperial College London, the Dana Library and Research Centre and the Natural History Museum. Kensington Park School is just south of the Queen's Gate Gardens, opposite the museum. The road also lends its name to a private girls' school, Queen's Gate School, which is situated on the road. On the west side is Baden-Powell House.

The 100 Queen's Gate Hotel London, a historical building dating back to 1870, is also situated there.

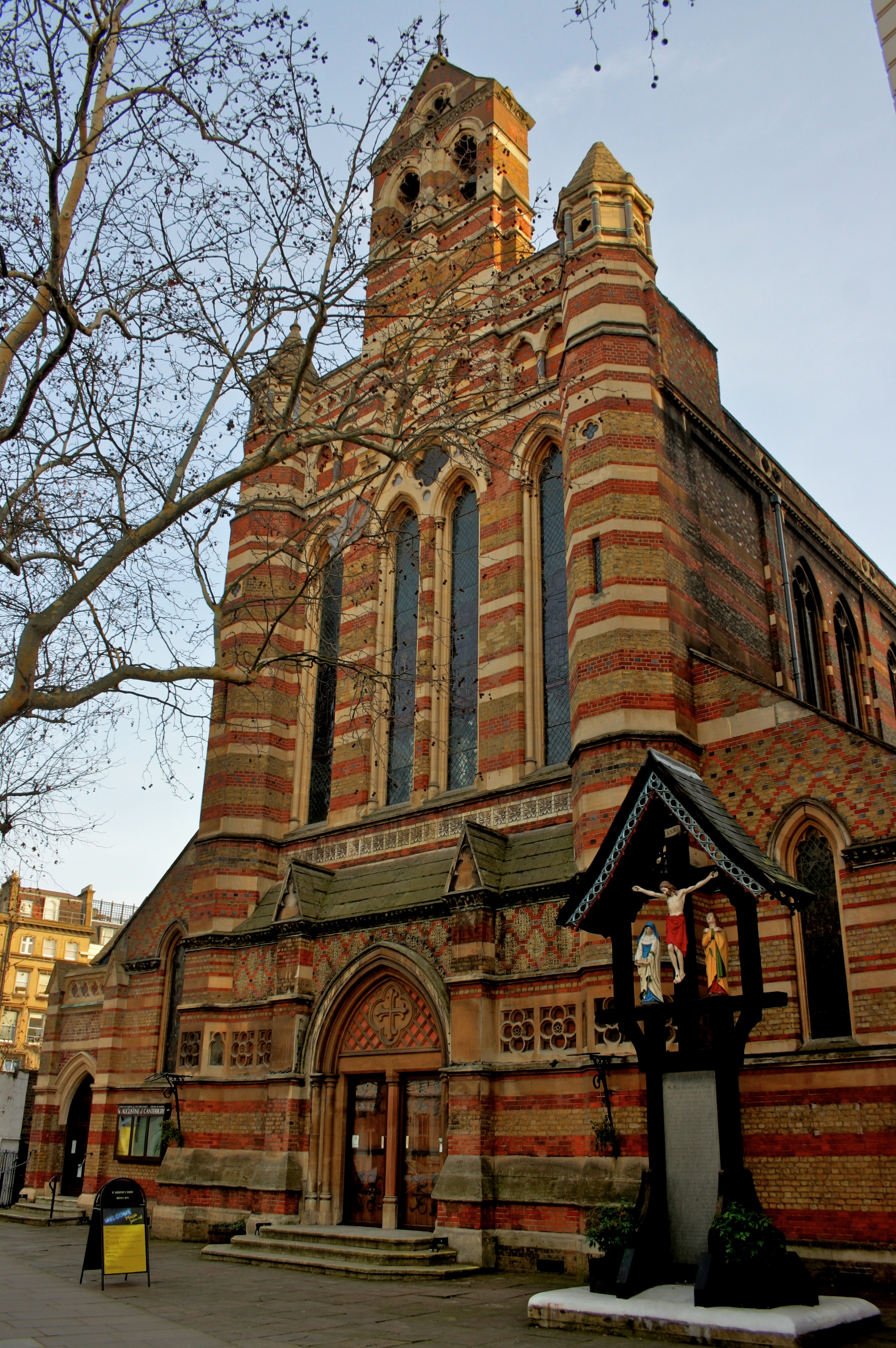
St Augustine's, Queen's Gate, London.

The only church is St Augustine's of Canterbury (Church of England).

Five countries have embassies or high commissions in Queen's Gate: the Embassy of Iraq is at no. 21, the Bangladeshi High Commission at No. 28, the Royal Embassy of Thailand is at Nos. 29–30, the Embassy of Oman is at No. 167, and the Bulgarian Embassy is at Nos. 186–188.

The Security Service (MI5) was based at 73-75 Queen's Gate from 1919 to 1929.

The nearest tube stations are South Kensington and Gloucester Road.

== Notable people ==
- Benny Hill, comedian and actor (d. 1992)
- Dennis Gabor, physicist, 1971 Nobel Prize in Physics (d. 1979)
- Gerald Hocken Knight, compositor; organist of St Augustine's church, 1931-37 (d. 1979)
- Gilbert Ledward, sculptor (d. 1960)
- E. Beresford Chancellor, author known for his works on the history of London, died at no. 31 (d. 1937)
- Sir Richard Baggallay, barrister, MP then Lord Justice of Appeal, of no. 55 (d. 1888)
