= Khondker M. Talha =

Ambassador of Bangladesh to France
- In office 10 Sep 2021 –
- Preceded by: Kazi Imtiaz Hossain

Personal details
- Education: University of Dhaka; Monash University

Khondker M. Talha (3 October 1967) is one of the most senior diplomats in the Bangladesh Foreign Service. Before his current assignment as Ambassador Extraordinary and Plenipotentiary to France and Permanent Delegate to UNESCO (United Nations Educational, Scientific and Cultural Organization), he served as Director General for East Asia and Pacific at the Ministry of Foreign Affairs in Dhaka, overseeing relations with countries in that region. He was Deputy High Commissioner in London, Chief of Protocol in Dhaka, and served in Bangladesh missions in New York, Geneva, and Tehran, where he worked extensively on United Nations (UN), World Trade Organization (WTO), and international cooperation issues. He was elected to the bureau of different UN Commissions and Committees both in New York and Geneva. He led the Least Developed Countries Group at expert level at WTO and the UN Conference on Trade and Development (UNCTAD). He was elected President of the 43rd session of the General Conference of UNESCO in October 2025.

== Education ==
Ambassador Talha holds a master's degree in economics and an MBA from the University of Dhaka. He further pursued another master's in Foreign Affairs and Trade a at Monash University in Melbourne.

== Career ==
Talha joined the Bangladesh Foreign Service in 1995 and has since serviced in a range of bilateral and multilateral postings across four continents.

=== United Nations, New York (2002–2006) ===
During his tenure at the Permanent Mission of Bangladesh to the United Nations, Ambassador Talha worked with the Economic and Financial Committee (Second Committee) of the UN General Assembly, as well as with ECOSOC and various UN Funds and Programmes. In 2004, he was elected Vice-Chair of the UN Committee on Population and Development.

=== Embassy of Bangladesh, Tehran (2006–2008) ===
From 2006 to 2008, Ambassador Talha served as Deputy Head of Mission at the Embassy of Bangladesh in Tehran, Iran, contributing to Bangladesh's bilateral ties within South and West Asia.

=== Permanent Mission of Bangladesh, Geneva (2008–2011) ===
In Geneva, Ambassador Talha engaged with UNCTAD and the World Trade Organization (WTO). He coordinated the Least Developed Countries (LDC) Group at the expert level in both organizations. In 2010, he served as Rapporteur of the 99th Council of the International Organization for Migration (IOM) and also evaluated the efficacy of UNCTAD's technical assistance programs.

=== Chief of Protocol (2012–2014) ===
Ambassador Talha served as Chief of Protocol at the Ministry of Foreign Affairs in Dhaka from 2012 to 2014, managing diplomatic protocol and coordinating state-level engagements.

=== Deputy High Commissioner, London (2014–2018) ===
As Deputy High Commissioner of Bangladesh in London, he worked to advance political, economic, and cultural relations between Bangladesh and the United Kingdom.

=== Director General for East Asia and Pacific (2019-2021) ===
Prior to his current posting, Ambassador Talha served as Director General for East Asia and Pacific at the Ministry of Foreign Affairs in Dhaka, overseeing Bangladesh's relations with countries across a strategically significant region and guiding bilateral and regional policy formulation.

=== Ambassador to France and UNESCO (2021-present) ===
Ambassador Talha currently serves as the Ambassador of Bangladesh to France and concurrently as Bangladesh's Permanent Delegate to UNESCO, headquartered in Paris. In this capacity, he was elected to the position of President of the 43rd General Conference of UNESCO, the organization's supreme governing body.

== Personal life ==
Ambassador Talha is married and has a daughter and two sons.
