= Mohammed Sakhawat Rahman =

Bangladeshi politician

- মোহাম্মদ সাখাওয়াত রহমান

Member of Parliament from Dinajpur-4
- In office 1988–1990
- Preceded by: Mizanur Rahman Manu
- Succeeded by: Mizanur Rahman Manu

Personal details
- Born: Dinajpur District
- Party: Jatiya Party

Mohammed Sakhawat Rahman is a politician from the Dinajpur District of Bangladesh and a former member of parliament from Dinajpur-4.

== Career ==
Sakhawat was elected to parliament from Dinajpur-4 as an independent candidate in 1988. He was defeated from Dinajpur-4 constituency in 1991 on the nomination of Jatiya party.
