= Embassy of Thailand, London =

Royal Thai Embassy in London
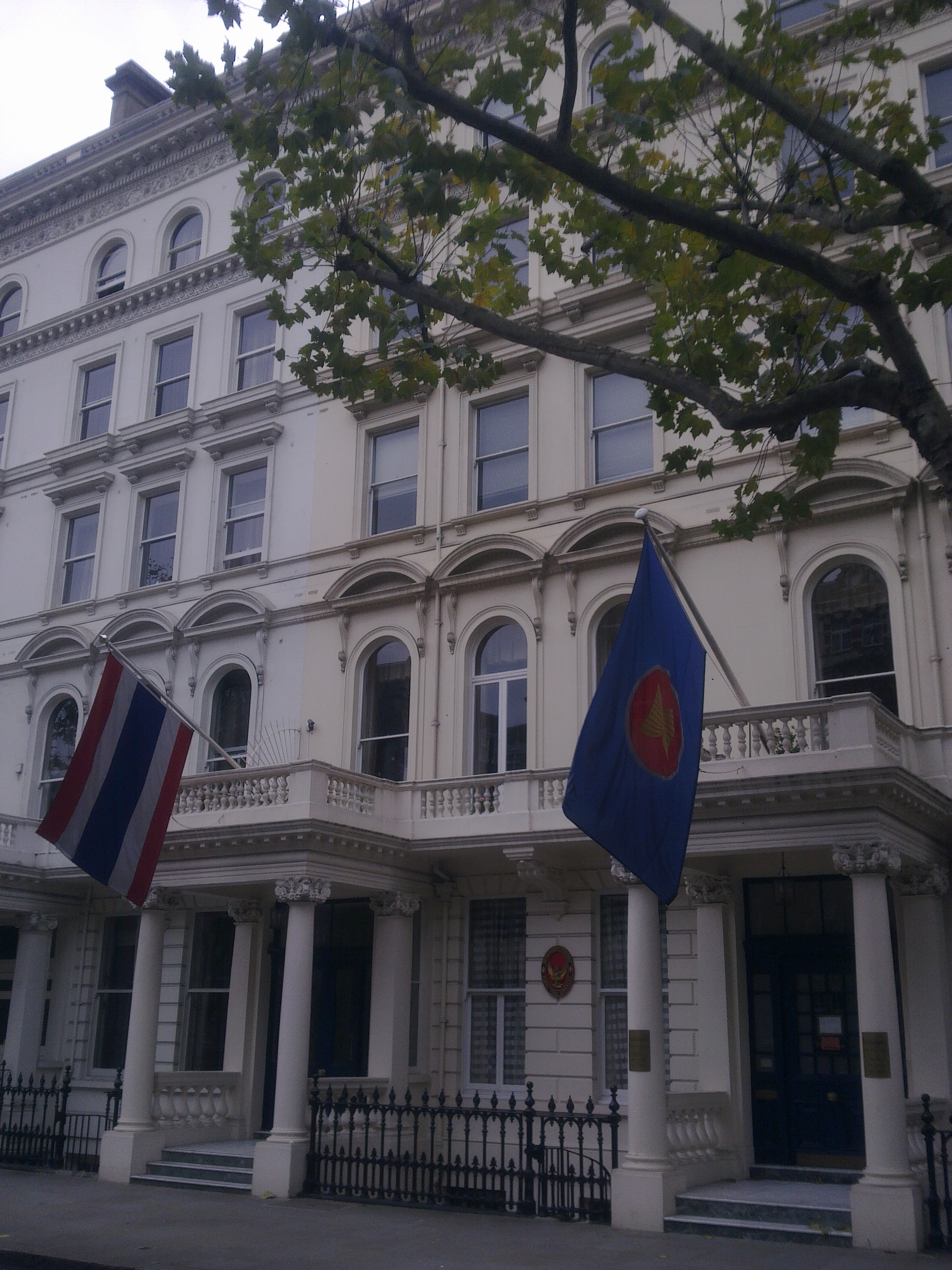
- The embassy in 2013
- Location: South Kensington, London
- Address: 29–30 Queen's Gate, London, SW7 5JB
- Coordinates: 51°29′54.2″N 0°10′47.8″W

Listed Building – Grade II
- Official name: 27-35, Queen's Gate SW7
- Designated: 15 April 1969
- Reference no.: 1226094
- Ambassador: H.E. Mr. Nadhavathna Krishnamra

The Royal Thai Embassy in London (Thai: สถานเอกอัครราชทูตไทย ณ กรุงลอนดอน) is the diplomatic mission of Thailand in the United Kingdom, located at Queen's Gate. The embassy is also accredited to Ireland on a non-resident basis. The building is one of a group of Grade II listed buildings in Queen's Gate, which includes the High Commission of Bangladesh next door.

Thailand also maintains an Office of the Air Attaché at 2 Victoria Road, South Kensington, an Office of Commercial Attaché at 11 Hertford Street, Mayfair and an Office of Educational Attaché at 28 Prince's Gate, South Kensington. The Ambassador's Residence is located in a separate building on Tregunter Road, Brompton. Within the embassy's authority, Thailand also operates honorary consulates in Cardiff, Gibraltar, and Hull.

== History ==
It has been located at its current address since 1965. Prior to that it was located at 21-23 Ashburn Place, its home since 1884.

In 1962, the embassy cooperated with former British ambassadors to Thailand, and British and Thai businessmen to form the Anglo-Thai Society headed by Prince Chula Chakrabongse. The embassy continues to have a close relationship with the Society.

During the COVID-19 pandemic in the United Kingdom and Ireland, many Thai nationals were looking for ways to return to Thailand. On 30 July 2020, the embassy announced that online registration for special flights back to Thailand would open to Thai nationals in the UK and Ireland. However, the registration page crashed a few hours after opening on 31 July as a result of high user traffic. As a result, 60 Thais in the UK filed a petition to the Thai government and House of Representatives to increase flights between the UK and Thailand.

== Gallery ==
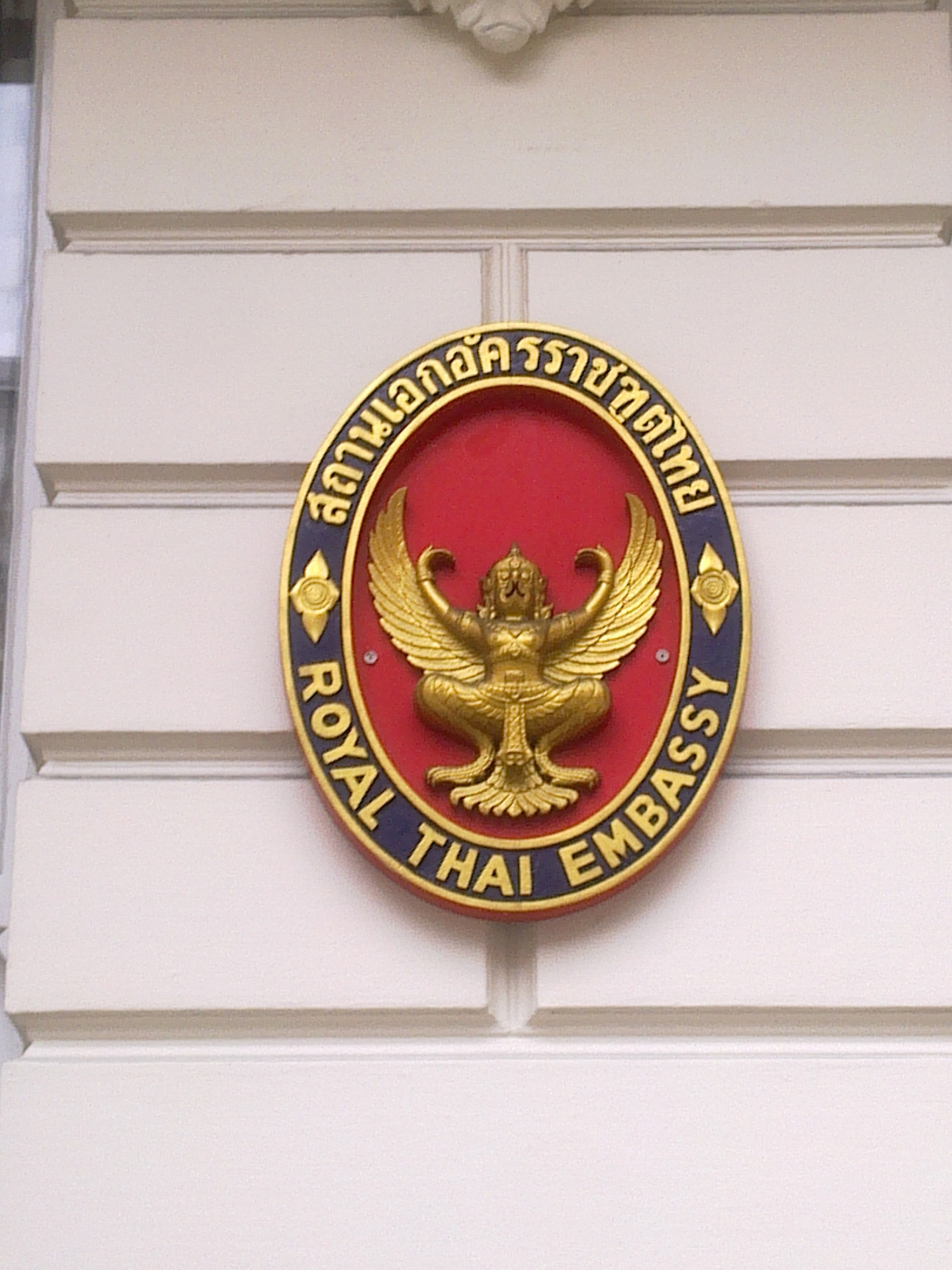
Plaque outside the embassy showing the Emblem of Thailand

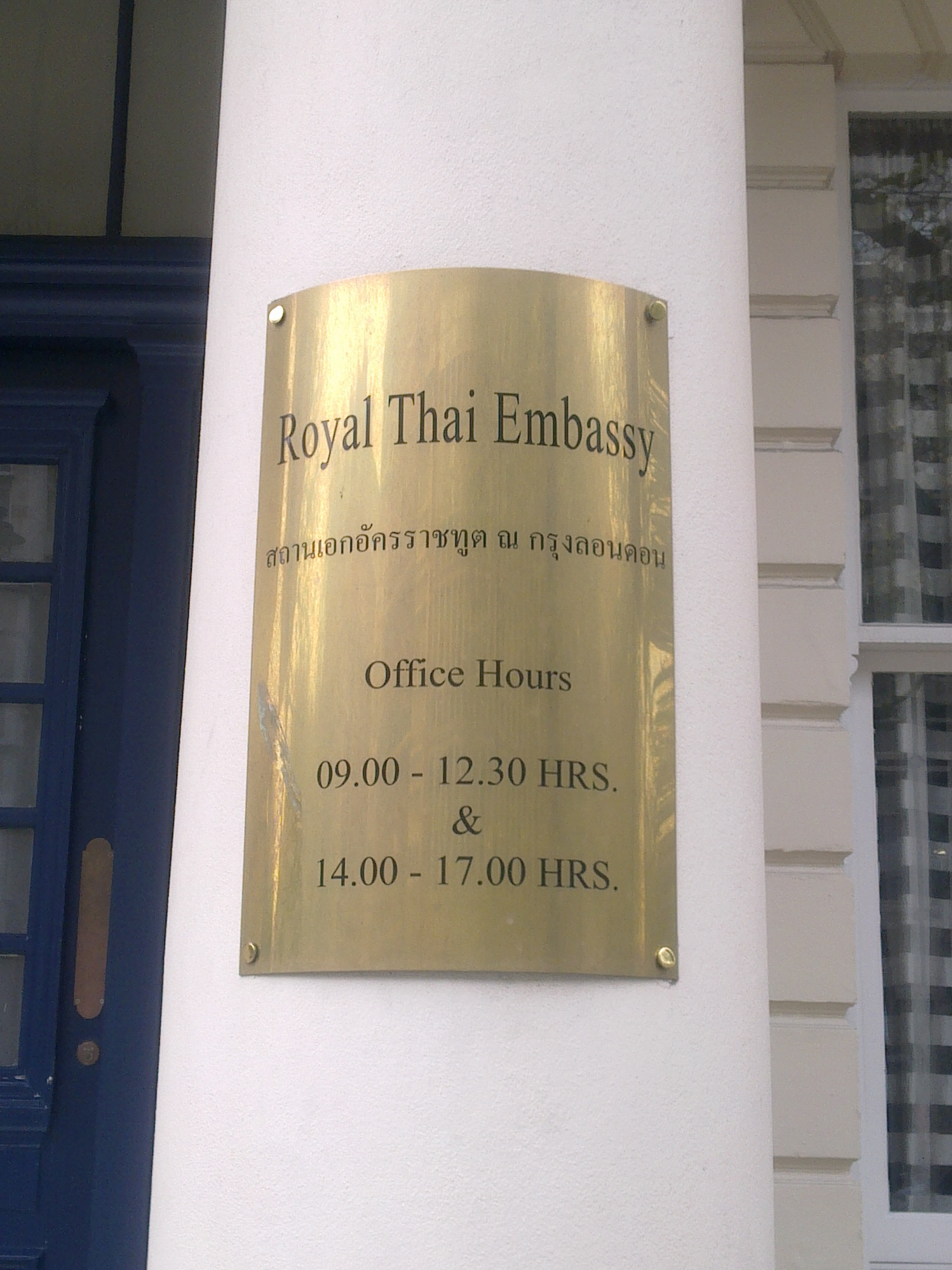
Plaque outside the embassy in English and Thai

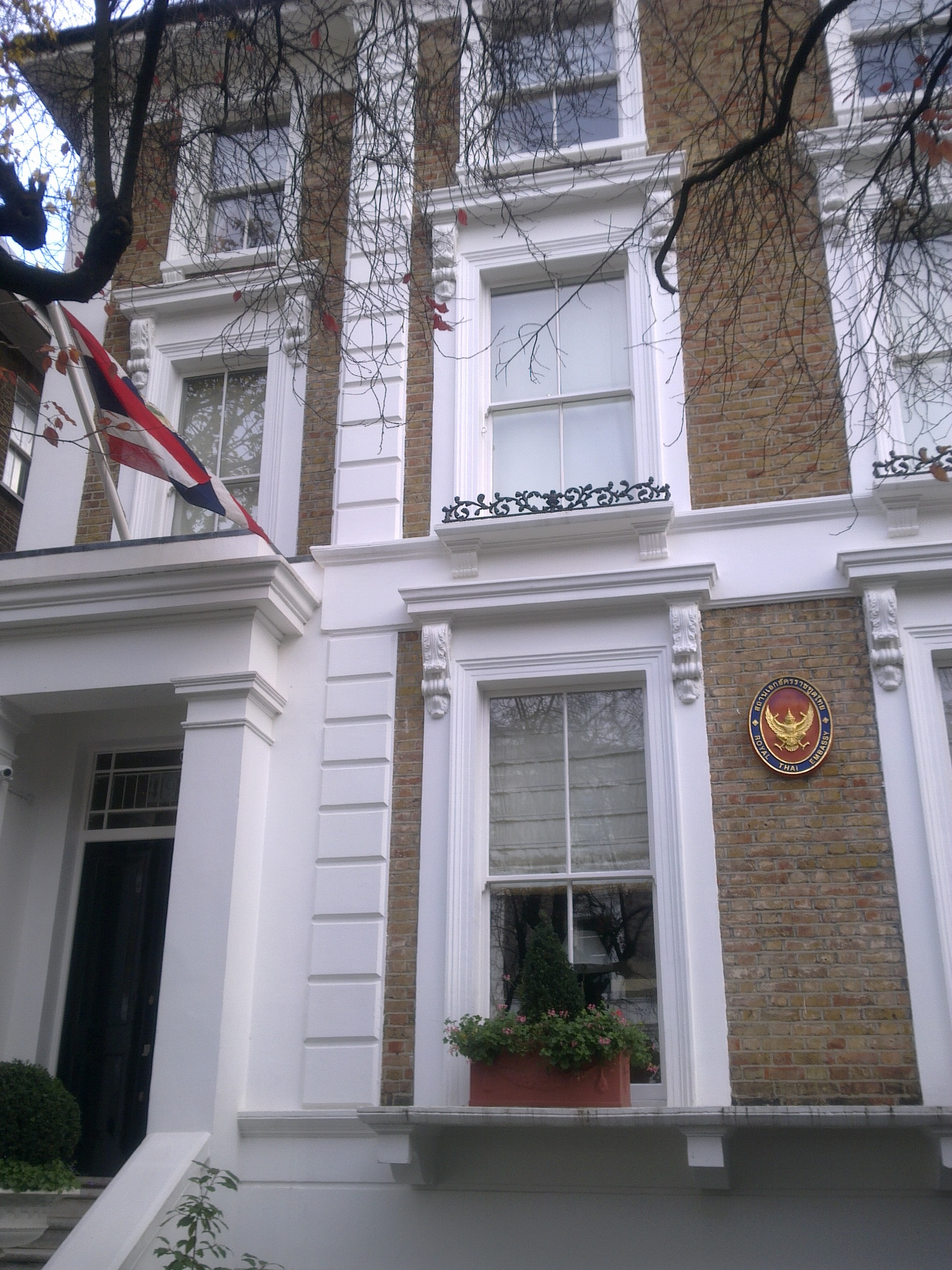
The Ambassador's Residence on Tregunter Road

== See also ==
- Thailand–United Kingdom relations
- Embassy of the United Kingdom, Bangkok
