= Kazi Imtiaz Hossain =

Bangladeshi diplomat

Kazi
- কাজী ইমতিয়াজ হোসেন
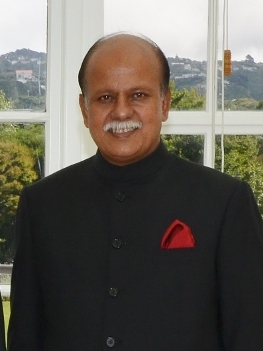
- Hossain in Wellington, New Zealand (2015)

Chairman of Bangladesh Institute of International and Strategic Studies
- In office 25 November 2021 – 31 December 2022
- Succeeded by: A F M Gousal Azam Sarker

Bangladesh Ambassador to France
- In office 18 December 2017 – 2021
- Preceded by: M Shahidul Islam
- Succeeded by: Khondker M. Talha

Bangladesh High Commissioner to Australia
- In office 16 Jul 2014 – 2017
- Preceded by: Masud Uddin Chowdhury
- Succeeded by: Md Sufiur Rahman

Bangladesh Ambassador to Thailand
- In office 13 April 2010 – 8 September 2014
- Preceded by: Mustafa Kamal
- Succeeded by: Saida Muna Tasneem

Personal details
- Spouse: Rabab Fatima
- Education: University of Dhaka

Kazi Imtiaz Hossain is a Bangladeshi diplomat. He served as the chairman of the board of governors of Bangladesh Institute of International and Strategic Studies (BIISS) during 2021–2022. He was the ambassador of Bangladesh to France, Australia and Thailand during 2010–2021. He was also accredited to other countries including Cambodia, Fiji, New Zealand, Vanuatu, and Solomon Islands.

== Education ==
Hossain earned his bachelor's and master's degrees in accounting and a diploma in international relations and diplomacy from the University of Dhaka. He is a member of the 1986 batch of Bangladesh Civil Service (Foreign Affairs) Cadre.

== Personal life ==
Hossain is married to Rabab Fatima who is also a diplomat. Together they have a daughter.
