= Rabab Fatima =

Bangladeshi diplomat

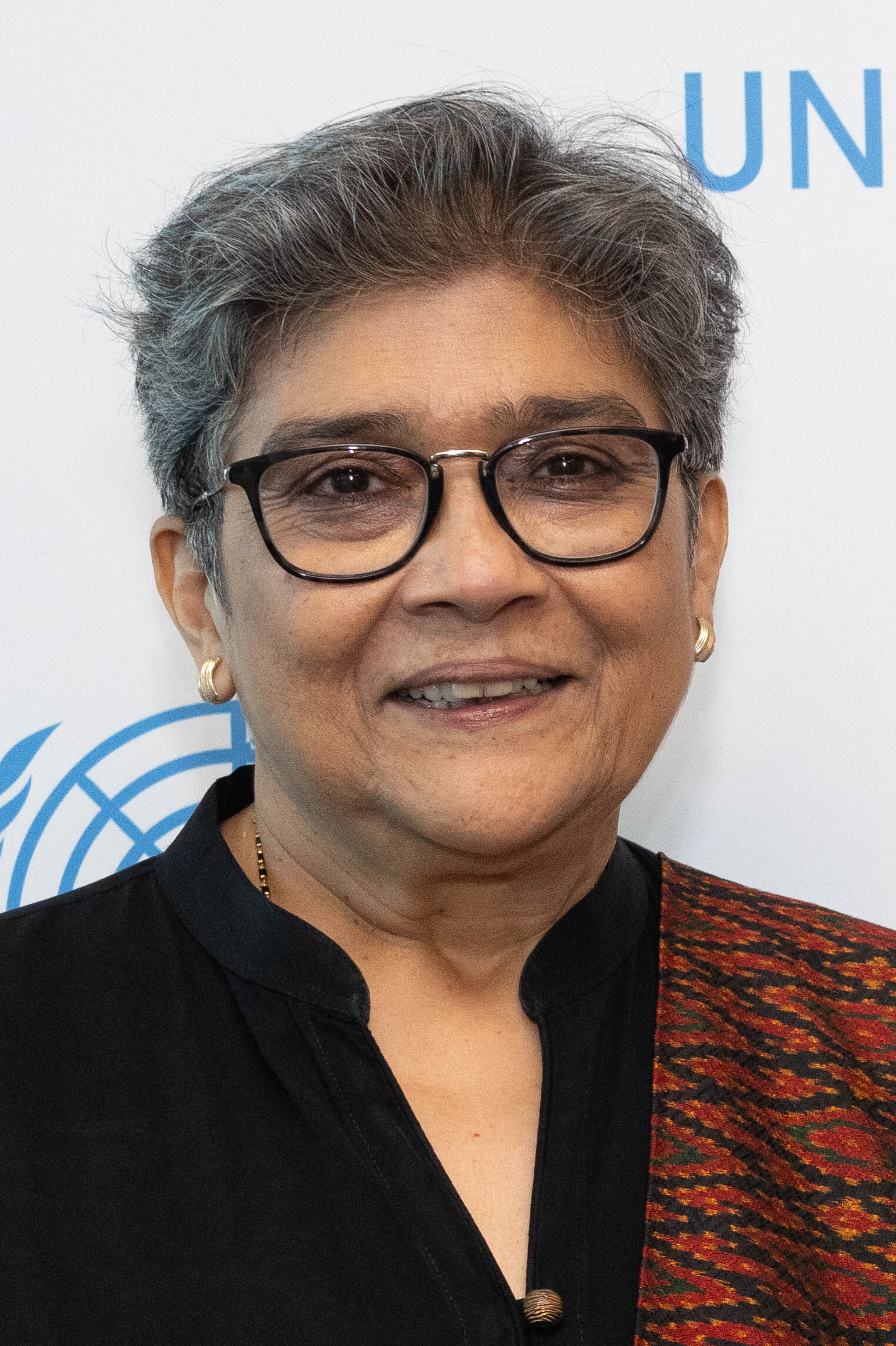
- Rabab Fatima in 2024

Special Representative of the United Nations Secretary-General for Afghanistan and Head of UNAMA
- Incumbent
- Assumed office 17 October 2026

Permanent Representative of Bangladesh to the United Nations
- In office 2019 – July 2022
- Preceded by: Masud Bin Momen
- Succeeded by: Muhammad Abdul Muhith

Ambassador of Bangladesh to Japan
- In office 9 February 2016 – 22 November 2019
- Preceded by: Masud Bin Momen
- Succeeded by: Shahabuddin Ahmed

Personal details
- Spouse: Kazi Imtiaz Hossain
- Education: Tufts University; University of Canberra
- Occupation: Diplomat

Rabab Fatima is a Bangladeshi diplomat, serving as a Special Representative of the Secretary-General for Afghanistan and head of the United Nations Assistance Mission in Afghanistan (UNAMA). Previously, she served as the United Nations High Representative for Least Developed Countries, Landlocked Developing Countries and Small Island Developing States (UNOHRLLS) from 2022 to 2026. From 2019 to July 2022, she served as Permanent Representative of Bangladesh to the United Nations. Before that, she was Bangladesh's ambassador to Japan. On 1 February 2022, she was elected the Chair of the United Nations Peacebuilding Commission (PBC).

== Biography ==
Fatima joined the Bangladesh Foreign Service in 1989. She has served in various Bangladesh missions, including as First Secretary in the Permanent Mission to the UN, New York (1994-1998); Counsellor, Deputy High Commission, Kolkata (1998-2000); Counsellor, Permanent Mission to the UN, Geneva (2002-2005); and Minister & DCM, Embassy in Beijing (2005).

In the Ministry of Foreign Affairs, she has served in various positions, including as Assistant Secretary (UN), Director (UN) and Director General (East Asia & Pacific). She has specialization in human rights and humanitarian affairs, and was closely involved in the processes leading to Bangladesh's accession to the major human rights and disarmament treaties.

Fatima also served in lien with two international organizations, namely, as Head of Human Rights (2006-2007) in the Commonwealth Secretariat, London; and with the International Organization for Migration (IOM) as the Regional Representative for South Asia (2007-2011); and as the Regional Adviser for South and South-west Asia & Regional Adviser for Climate Change and Migration in IOM's Regional Office for Asia and the Pacific (2012-2015).

As the IOM's Regional Representative for South Asia, in 2011, she oversaw the return of nearly 37,000 Bangladeshi migrant workers from Libya to Bangladesh following the outbreak of conflict. She was also actively engaged with the successful implementation of the reintegration programme for these migrant workers.

Fatima was the president of the UNICEF Executive Board in 2020. She was also elected as the vice president of the UNDP/UNFPA/UNOPS Executive Board for 2021 in December 2020. Fatima was also appointed as co-facilitator along with the Permanent Representative of Slovenia to lead the intergovernmental consultation on the alignment of the agendas of the General Assembly and ECOSOC.

Fatima received her M.A. in international relations and diplomacy from the Fletcher School of Law and Diplomacy, Tufts University, and B.A. in social science from the University of Canberra, Australia.

== Personal life ==
Fatima is married to former ambassador Kazi Imtiaz Hossain, who is the chairman of the Board of Governors of Bangladesh Institute of International and Strategic Studies (BIISS). Together they have a daughter.
