= Humayun A. Kamal =

Bangladeshi diplomat

- হুমায়ুন এ. কামাল

Ambassador of Bangladesh to South Korea
- In office 29 July 2002 – 8 January 2004
- Preceded by: Iftikharul Karim
- Succeeded by: A. M. Mahmuduzzaman

Ambassador of Bangladesh to China
- In office 15 January 2000 – 29 July 2002

Ambassador of Bangladesh to Poland

Humayun A. Kamal is a Bangladeshi career diplomat and former ambassador of Bangladesh to China and South Korea. He was the ambassador of Bangladesh to Poland with concurrent accreditation to Hungary and Slovakia.

== Career ==
Kamal has served in various positions within the Ministry of Foreign Affairs. Over the course of his diplomatic career, he has been posted to several Bangladesh missions abroad, including as Second Secretary at the mission in Kuala Lumpur and as First Secretary at the missions in Baghdad and Tokyo. He was the Director General of the SAARC wing at the Ministry of Foreign Affairs.

In January 2000, Kamal was appointed as Bangladesh's ambassador to China. He was serving as ambassador to Poland, Hungary, and Slovakia. On 29 July 2002, he was appointed Ambassador of Bangladesh to South Korea, succeeding Iftikharul Karim. He served until 1 January 2004 and was replaced by A. M. Mahmuduzzaman.
