= Shafi U Ahmed =

Indian politician

High Commissioner of Bangladesh to the United Kingdom
- In office 2007–2009
- Preceded by: AHM Mofazzal Karim
- Succeeded by: M. Sayeedur Rahman Khan

High Commissioner to Malaysia
- In office 2003–2007
- Preceded by: Masud Aziz

Shafi U Ahmed was the High Commissioner of Bangladesh to the United Kingdom from 2007 to 2009. Previously he served as Bangladesh's High Commissioner to Malaysia.

Ahmed is an alumnus of The Fletcher School, Tufts University, Boston, USA, from which he graduated in 1986.

Ahmed served in different Bangladesh Missions abroad as well as in the Ministry of Foreign Affairs of Bangladesh in various capacities including as the Director General for Administration.
