= Abu Zafar =

Bangladeshi diplomat (born 1963)

- মো. আবু জাফর
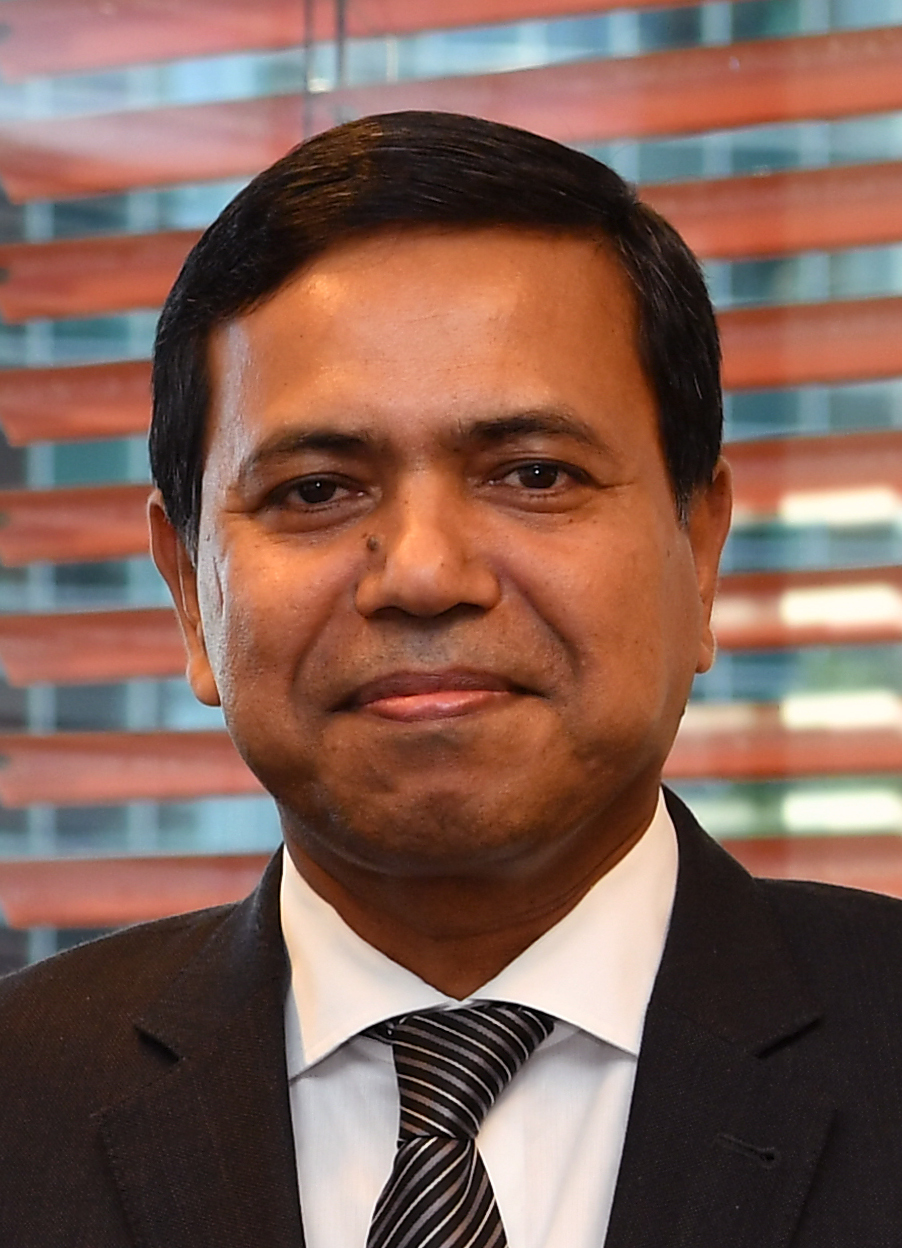
- Zafar in Vienna (2019)

Ambassador of Bangladesh to United Arab Emirates
- In office 2023 – 2024 December
- President: Mohammed Shahabuddin
- Preceded by: Position created
- Succeeded by: Tareq Ahmed

Ambassador of Bangladesh to Austria
- In office 2 December 2014 – 5 July 2020
- Succeeded by: Muhammad Abdul Muhith

Personal details
- Born: Mohammed Abu Zafar; 1 March 1963 (age 63)
- Spouse: Salma Ahmed
- Education: Sher-e-Bangla Agricultural University
- Occupation: Diplomat

Mohammed Abu Zafar (born 1 March 1963) is a Bangladeshi civil servant and career diplomat. He is a former ambassador of Bangladesh to UAE. Earlier, he permanent representative to the UN offices or intergovernmental organizations in Vienna.

== Early life ==
Abu Zafar was born on 1 March 1963 in the then East Pakistan (now Bangladesh). He obtained his BSc from Sher-e-Bangla Agricultural University in Agriculture and Postgraduate diploma in International relations from École nationale de la France d'Outre-Mer (IIAP) in Paris, France. He completed his MBA from Preston University.

== Career ==
Abu Zafar served at Bangladesh Jute Research Institute as a Scientific Officer from July 1987 to November 1989. He also served at the Ministry of Post and Telecommunication as an Assistant Postmaster General from December 1990 to November 1991. He joined the Bangladeshi Foreign Service in 1991.
