= Abida Islam =

Bangladeshi diplomat

- আবিদা ইসলাম
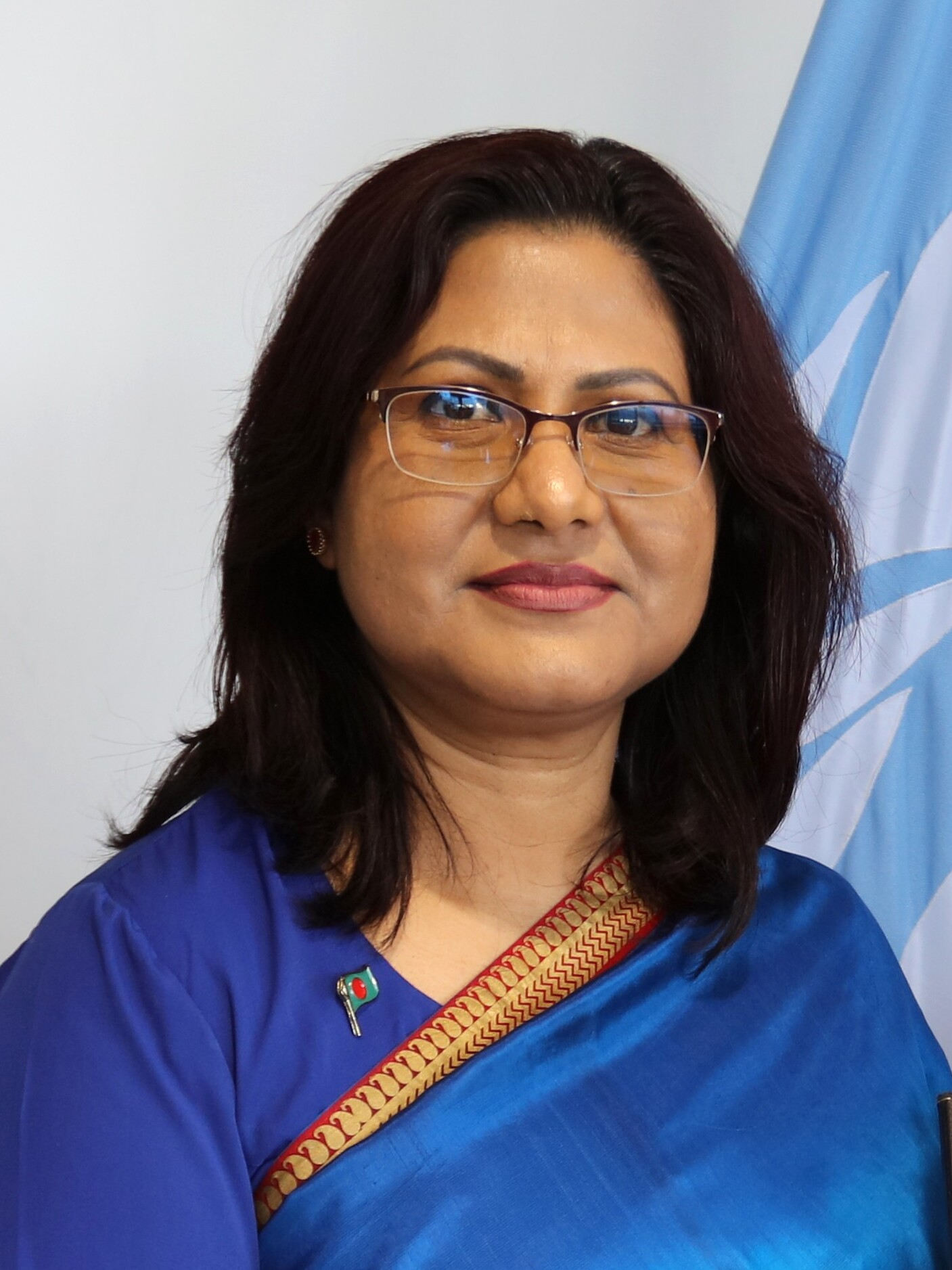
- Islam in 2025

High Commissioner of Bangladesh to the United Kingdom
- In office 27 January 2025 – 7 March 2026
- President: Mohammed Shahabuddin
- Prime Minister: Muhammad Yunus (Chief adviser); Tarique Rahman
- Preceded by: Saida Muna Tasneem
- Succeeded by: Muhammad Abdul Muhith

Ambassador of Bangladesh to Mexico
- In office June 2022 – November 2024
- President: Mohammad Abdul Hamid; Mohammed Shahabuddin
- Prime Minister: Sheikh Hasina; Muhammad Yunus (Chief adviser)
- Preceded by: Supradip Chakma
- Succeeded by: Mushfiqul Fazal Ansarey

Ambassador of Bangladesh to South Korea
- In office 21 December 2017 – 21 August 2021
- President: Mohammad Abdul Hamid
- Prime Minister: Sheikh Hasina
- Preceded by: Zulfiqur Rahman
- Succeeded by: Md. Delwar Hossain

Personal details
- Born: Dhaka, East Pakistan
- Education: University of Dhaka; Monash University
- Occupation: Diplomat

Abida Islam is a Bangladeshi diplomat who served as the High commissioner of Bangladesh to the United Kingdom. She previously served as the Ambassador of Bangladesh to Mexico and South Korea, and as the Deputy High Commissioner to India. She also held the position of Director General for Americas Affairs at the Ministry of Foreign Affairs.

== Education ==
Islam completed her master's degree in sociology at the University of Dhaka. She has a second masters in foreign affairs and trade at Monash University.

== Career ==
Islam joined the foreign service as part of the 15th Bangladesh Civil Service batch in November 1995. She served in the Bangladesh High Commission in Sri Lanka and the United Kingdom. She was the deputy high commissioner of Bangladesh to India in Kolkata from 2012 to 2014.

Islam was the director general of Americas in the Ministry of Foreign Affairs. She was appointed ambassador of Bangladesh to South Korea in July 2017. she inaugurated an corner dedicated to Sheikh Mujibur Rahman at the Yonsei University library with President Seoung Hwan Suh of the university. She supported the launch of the Korean Language translation of The Unfinished Memoirs by Sheikh Mujibur Rahman.

In July 2021, Islam was appointed ambassador of Bangladesh to Mexico. She was concurrently accredited to Costa Rica, Guatemala, Ecuador, and Honduras. She worked to establish Mexico-Bangladesh Virtual Business Platform. Md Delwar Hossain replaced her as ambassador of Bangladesh to South Korea. She oversaw the formation of the Mexico-Bangladesh Parliamentary Friendship Group.

In January 2025, Islam was appointed as the High commissioner of Bangladesh to the United Kingdom succeeding Saida Muna Tasneem.
