= Dinajpur-4 =

Constituency of Bangladesh's Jatiya Sangsad

Coordinates: 25.65°N 88.77°E

- Constituency for the Jatiya Sangsad
- District: Dinajpur District
- Division: Rangpur Division
- Electorate: 421,278 (2026)

Current constituency
- Created: 1973
- Party: Bangladesh Nationalist Party
- Member: Akhtaruzzaman Mia
- ← 8 Dinajpur-3 10 Dinajpur-5 →

Dinajpur-4 is a constituency represented in the Jatiya Sangsad (National Parliament) of Bangladesh since 2026 by Akhtaruzzaman Mia of the Bangladesh Nationalist Party.

== Boundaries ==
The constituency encompasses Chirirbandar and Khansama upazilas.

== History ==
The constituency was created for the first general elections in newly independent Bangladesh, held in 1973.

== Members of Parliament ==
Election	Member	Party
1973	Ali Akbar	Awami League
1979	Mirza Ruhul Amin	Bangladesh Nationalist Party
Major Boundary Changes
1986	Mizanur Rahman Manu	Workers Party of Bangladesh
1988	Mohammed Sakhawat Rahman	Jatiya Party
1991	Mizanur Rahman Manu	Awami League
Feb 1996	Abdul Halim	Bangladesh Nationalist Party
Jun 1996	Mizanur Rahman Manu	Awami League
2001	Akhtaruzzaman Mia	Bangladesh Nationalist Party
2008	Abul Hassan Mahmood Ali	Awami League
2014	Abul Hassan Mahmood Ali	Awami League
2018	Abul Hassan Mahmood Ali	Awami League
2024	Abul Hassan Mahmood Ali	Awami League
2026	Akhtaruzzaman Mia	Bangladesh Nationalist Party

== Elections ==
=== Elections in the 2020s ===
General election 2026: Dinajpur-4
Party	Candidate	Votes	%	±%
BNP	Akhtaruzzaman Mia	165,577		
Jamaat	Md. Aftab Uddin Mollah	127,666		
Majority		37,911		
Turnout				
Registered electors		421,278		
BNP gain from AL				

=== Elections in the 2010s ===
General Election 2014: Dinajpur-4
Party	Candidate	Votes	%	±%
AL	Abul Hassan Mahmood Ali	68,088	98.0	+51.3
WPB	Enamul Haque Sarkar	1,380	2.0	N/A
Majority		66,708	96.0	+80.6
Turnout		69,468	22.9	−69.8
AL hold				

=== Elections in the 2000s ===
General Election 2008: Dinajpur-4
Party	Candidate	Votes	%	±%
AL	Abul Hassan Mahmood Ali	118,188	46.7	+4.5
BNP	Akhtaruzzaman Mia	79,133	31.3	−21.0
Independent	Hafizur Rahman Sarkar	50,274	19.9	N/A
Independent	Mizanur Rahman Manu	4,511	1.8	N/A
BSD	Md. Asaf-ud-doula	870	0.3	N/A
Majority		39,055	15.4	+5.3
Turnout		252,976	92.7	+6.4
AL gain from BNP				

General Election 2001: Dinajpur-4
Party	Candidate	Votes	%	±%
BNP	Akhtaruzzaman Mia	108,360	52.3	+21.7
AL	Mizanur Rahman Manu	87,351	42.2	+1.1
IJOF	Md. Sekender Ali Shah	8,094	3.9	N/A
Independent	Md. Emdadul Islam Chowdhury	2,869	1.4	N/A
Independent	Monindra Nath Ray	487	0.2	N/A
Majority		21,009	10.1	−0.5
Turnout		207,161	86.3	+11.3
BNP gain from AL				

=== Elections in the 1990s ===
General Election June 1996: Dinajpur-4
Party	Candidate	Votes	%	±%
AL	Mizanur Rahman Manu	59,746	41.1	−6.3
BNP	Abdul Halim	44,394	30.6	+18.0
Jamaat	Aftab Uddin Mollah	30,040	20.7	−8.0
JP(E)	Mirza Samsul Wazed	10,700	7.4	−0.1
Bangladesh Janata Party	Md. Saiful Islam	374	0.3	N/A
Majority		15,352	10.6	−8.1
Turnout		145,254	75.0	+10.6
AL hold				

General Election 1991: Dinajpur-4
Party	Candidate	Votes	%	±%
AL	Mizanur Rahman Manu	58,745	47.4	
Jamaat	Aftab Uddin Mollah	35,538	28.7	
BNP	Abdul Halim	15,566	12.6	
JP(E)	Md. Sakhawat Hossain	9,280	7.5	
JSD	Md. Akter Hosain	1,796	1.5	
Independent	Jamil Udiin Ahmed	1,485	1.2	
Jatiya Samajtantrik Dal-JSD	M. A. Rashid Beg	527	0.4	
NDP	Md. Omar Faruk Shah	305	0.2	
Zaker Party	A. F. M. Mahmudul Islam	292	0.2	
Independent	Shree Ashwini Kumar Roy	214	0.2	
Bangladesh Muslim League (Matin)	Md. Abu Ali Chowdhury	108	0.1	
Majority		23,207	18.7	
Turnout		123,856	64.4	
AL gain from				
