= Syed Abdus Sultan =

Bangladeshi politician

- সৈয়দ আব্দুস সুলতান
- Born: 1917; Sherpur, Mymensingh district, Bengal Presidency
- Died: December 11, 1991 (aged 73–74); Dhaka, Bangladesh
- Education: University of Dacca; Ripon College, Calcutta
- Political party: Pakistan Muslim League (1962−1970); Awami League (from 1970)

Syed Abdus Sultan (Bengali: সৈয়দ আব্দুস সুলতান; 1917 − 11 December 1991) was a Bangladeshi politician, lawyer, orator and author. He was a member of the 3rd National Assembly of Pakistan, and former High Commissioner of Bangladesh to the United Kingdom (1972−1976) and Libya.

== Early life ==
Sultan was born in 1917 to a Bengali Muslim family of Syeds in the village of Rauha in Sherpur, Mymensingh district, Bengal Presidency. He received his Bachelor of Arts from Ripon College, Calcutta in 1936 and Bachelor of Law from University of Dacca in 1938. He also holds a Master of Arts degree.

== Political career ==
He began his career as a cooperative officer for eleven years. He joined the Mymensingh District Court in 1945. Sultan was elected to the Mymensingh-V constituency for the 3rd National Assembly of Pakistan in 1962. He was renowned for his informative and logical speeches as the deputy Leader of the Opposition, representing the Muslim League. He became a judge at the Dacca High Court in 1956. In 1969, he was elected as a member of the Pakistan Bar Council and served there for three years.

He joined the Awami League in 1970, and was elected to the Mymensingh Sadar constituency at the December elections of the same year. During the Bangladesh Liberation War, he represented the Provisional Government of Bangladesh at the United Nations and travelled to the United States, United Kingdom and Canada to garner support. He thanked Indian politician Swaran Singh for speaking on behalf of the Bangladeshi cause at the United Nations. Sultan served as the first High Commissioner of Bangladesh to the United Kingdom following its independence. On 22 July 1975, he was appointed the Ambassador of Bangladesh to Libya.

== Literary career ==
Sultan has written several works in Bengali such as:

- Sabuzer Kahini, novel (1951)
- Taruner Jinnah, biography (1948)
- Chhotader Bangabandhu, biography
- Juge Juge Maanush
- Maniraag
- Ibne Sina, biography
- Videshi Chhota Galpa
- Panchanadeer Palimaati, travel diary
- Smritichaaran, memoirs
- Byatikramer Ek Adhyaay, political

== Death ==
Sultan died in Dhaka, on 11 December 1991.
