= A. M. Mahmuduzzaman =

Bangladeshi army officer and diplomat

A. M. Mahmuduzzaman is a retired major general and former Principal Staff Officer of the Bangladesh Army. He later served as Bangladesh's ambassador to South Korea.

== Career ==
As the Principal Staff Officer, Mahmuduzzaman hosted General Muhammad Aziz Khan, Chairman of the Joint Chiefs of Staff Committee of the Pakistan Armed Forces, during his five-day tour of Bangladesh in 2003. He was involved in the launch of the Rapid Action Team (RAT) in 2003, which later became the Rapid Action Battalion.

In February 2004, Mahmuduzzaman replaced Humayun A. Kamal as the ambassador of Bangladesh to South Korea. From 17 February 2004 to 31 July 2005, served as Bangladesh's ambassador to South Korea. Mustafa Kamal succeeded him.

== Personal life ==
Mahmuduzzaman is an Ahmadi.
