= Tuesday Club (Bangladesh) =

The Tuesday Club is an informal group of foreign diplomats based in Dhaka, Bangladesh. Its membership includes the ambassadors and high commissioners of Australia, Canada, Denmark, France, Germany, Italy, Japan, the Netherlands, Norway, South Korea, Sweden, Switzerland, the United Kingdom, and the United States, along with the Ambassador of the European Commission and the United Nations Resident Coordinator. All the nations in the Tuesday Club are major donor nations to the People's Republic of Bangladesh.

The Tuesday Club had played a crucial role in the 2001 general election.

In 2005, tensions emerged between the Government of Bangladesh and foreign diplomats in Dhaka over the upcoming general elections. Foreign Minister M. Morshed Khan publicly criticized the 'Tuesday Group' for what he termed interference in Bangladesh's internal affairs. The group had expressed concern about ensuring free and fair elections and proposed a roundtable discussion involving domestic and international stakeholders. Khan rejected their involvement, asserting that diplomatic conduct must respect national sovereignty and constitutional processes, and emphasised that governance in Bangladesh is determined by its Constitution and Parliament, not by external pressure or informal diplomatic forums.

According to newspaper editor Nurul Kabir, the Tuesday Club was primarily responsible for the military takeover by the Bangladesh Army in January 2007.
