= Abul Hassan Mahmood Ali =

Bangladeshi politician and diplomat (1943–2025)

- আবুল হাসান মাহমুদ আলী
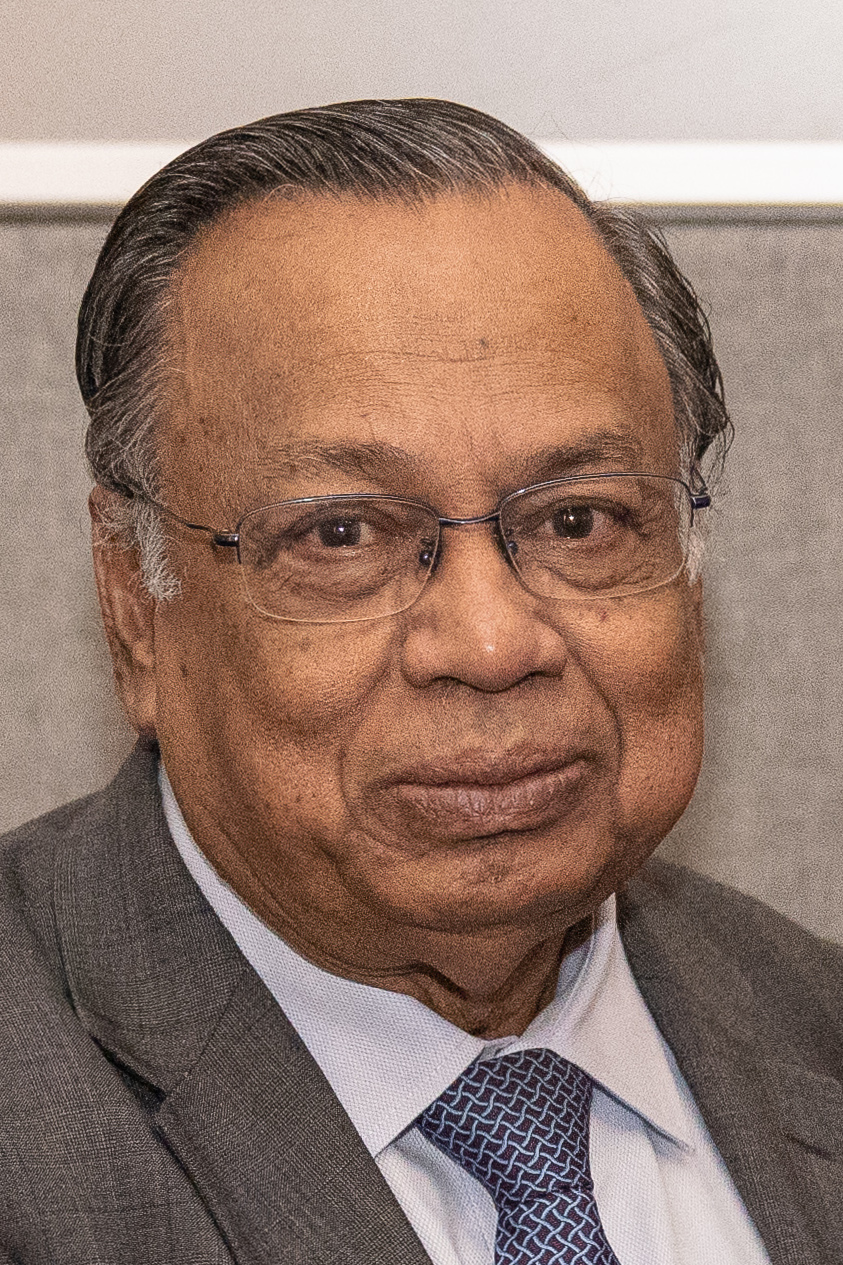
- Ali in 2018

Minister of Finance
- In office 11 January 2024 – 5 August 2024
- Prime Minister: Sheikh Hasina
- Deputy: Waseqa Ayesha Khan
- Preceded by: Mustafa Kamal
- Succeeded by: Salehuddin Ahmed (as adviser)

Member of the Bangladesh Parliament for Dinajpur-4
- In office 6 January 2009 – 6 August 2024
- Preceded by: Akhtaruzzaman Mia
- Succeeded by: Akhtaruzzaman Mia

Minister of Foreign Affairs
- In office 20 November 2013 – 7 January 2019
- Prime Minister: Sheikh Hasina
- Preceded by: Dipu Moni
- Succeeded by: AK Abdul Momen

High Commissioner of Bangladesh to the United Kingdom
- In office 1996–2001
- Preceded by: Rezaul Karim
- Succeeded by: AHM Mofazzal Karim

Ambassador of Bangladesh to Nepal
- In office 8 February 1996 – 31 October 1996
- Preceded by: Syed Muhammad Hussain
- Succeeded by: Mohiuddin Ahmed

Ambassador of Bangladesh to Bhutan
- In office 23 May 1986 – 21 May 1990
- Preceded by: Mahbubul Alam
- Succeeded by: Syed Muazzem Ali

Personal details
- Born: 6 February 1943 Dinajpur, Bengal Province, British India
- Died: 6 November 2025 (aged 82) Dhaka, Bangladesh
- Party: Awami League

Abul Hassan Mahmood Ali (6 February 1943 – 6 November 2025) was a Bangladeshi politician and diplomat who served as finance minister of Bangladesh. He was also a parliamentarian and cabinet minister, including the foreign minister of Bangladesh from 2013 to 2019. He previously served as minister of disaster management and relief from 2012 to 2013.

== Early life and education ==
Abul Hassan Mahmood Ali was born on 6 February 1943 in Daktarpara, Khamar Bishnuganj (Tangua Post Office), Khansama, Dinajpur in the then Bengal Province (now in Bangladesh). His father, Hasan Ali, was a minister of the then Pakistan government. Mahmood passed HSC from Dhaka College. He received a B.A. with Honours (1962) and an M.A. degree in economics (1963) from the University of Dhaka. He was a lecturer in economics at the same university from 1964 to 1966.

== Diplomatic career ==
Ali joined the Pakistan Foreign Service (then including Bangladesh) in 1966 and was posted as vice-consul of Pakistan in New York City in 1968. Immediately after arriving in New York in 1968, he began to organize the small Bangladeshi community in the United States. Ali joined the Bangladesh Liberation War, in April 1971, and was appointed the representative to the United States from the provisional government of Bangladesh at Mujibnagar in May 1971. Ali fought for Bangladesh independence in the US and at the United Nations. He was executive assistant to Justice Abu Sayeed Chowdhury, chief overseas representative of the Mujibnagar government, and leader of the Bangladesh delegation to the United Nations.

After the declaration of Bangladesh's independence, Ali served as a representative to the United Nations and later as acting consul-general in New York City. Subsequently, he served in various capacities at the Foreign Ministry in Dhaka and at Bangladesh missions abroad. He served, from 1977 to 1979, as first secretary, counsellor and deputy high commissioner in New Delhi, India. At the foreign ministry, from 1979 to 1982, Ali served as director-general for administration, for international organisations, for United Nations Department of Economic and Social Affairs, for policy planning for South Asia, and for human rights. From 1983 to 1986, Ali was deputy chief of mission with the rank of ambassador in Beijing, China. From 1986 to 1990, he was ambassador to Bhutan.

As additional foreign secretary (bilateral), Ali handled South Asia and human rights among other subjects. He negotiated and signed the agreement for the Tin Bigha Corridor Implementation Agreement with India in 1992, and negotiated the Burmese Refugees Repatriation Agreement with Myanmar in 1992. Ali was ambassador to Germany, with concurrent accreditation to Austria, the Czech Republic, and Slovakia, from 1992 to 1995; ambassador to Nepal from February to October 1996; and high commissioner to the United Kingdom, with concurrent accreditation to Ireland, from 1996 to 2001.

== Political career ==
After retiring from active diplomatic service in April 2001, Ali entered politics, joining the Awami League. He served as a member of the Awami League Central Election Committee and was appointed a member of the Central Advisory Council of the party (December 2002). He was subsequently appointed co-chairman of the Awami League Subcommittee on International Affairs.

In December 2008, Ali was elected to parliament as an Awami League candidate, representing a rural constituency in Dinajpur, in northern Bangladesh. He was elected chairman of the Parliamentary Standing Committee on the Ministry of Foreign Affairs. He received government appointments to serve on various other important committees. He was appointed to the cabinet on 13 September 2012 and assumed charge of the newly created Ministry of Disaster Management and Relief, as minister, on 16 September 2012. Ali was appointed minister for foreign affairs in the government formed on 21 November 2013. He was re-appointed on 26 February 2014, following his re-election in the parliamentary elections of January 2014. On 12 January 2024, after the one-sided parliamentary election held in Bangladesh on 7 January 2024, he was appointed the finance minister.

== Political positions ==
Ali was a critic of Rohingya in Bangladesh and stated that he considered Rakhine Muslims to be a national security threat.

== Personal life and death ==
Ali had a wife and two sons. He died from kidney disease in Dhaka on 6 November 2025, at the age of 82.
