= Mustafa Kamal (ambassador) =

Bangladeshi diplomat

Ambassador of Bangladesh to Thailand
- In office 4 February 2008 – 8 September 2009
- Preceded by: Shahed Akhter
- Succeeded by: Kazi Imtiaz Hossain

Ambassador of Bangladesh to South Korea
- In office 12 August 2005 – 28 January 2008
- Preceded by: A. M. Mahmuduzzaman
- Succeeded by: M Shahidul Islam

Ambassador of Bangladesh to Oman
- In office 2003–2005
- Succeeded by: Golam Akbar Khondakar

Mustafa Kamal is a Bangladeshi career diplomat who served as ambassador of Bangladesh to Oman, South Korea and Thailand. He held several senior positions within the Ministry of Foreign Affairs.

== Early life and career ==
Kamal began his professional career in the Bangladesh Army, where he was commissioned as a second lieutenant in 1977. He had served in the Chittagong Hill Tracts conflict. After more than a decade in military service, he transitioned into diplomacy by joining the Ministry of Foreign Affairs' protocol wing in 1988.

== Career ==
Throughout his diplomatic tenure, Kamal served in multiple capacities in Bangladesh missions abroad and within the Ministry of Foreign Affairs. His roles included Minister (Political), Director General, Director, and Counsellor across different missions and wings. He was the Deputy Chief of Protocol of the Ministry of Foreign Affairs.

In 2003, Kamal was appointed as Bangladesh's Ambassador to Oman. After completing his posting, the government announced his appointment as the next Ambassador to the Republic of Korea in July 2005. Golam Akbar Khondakar replaced him as Bangladesh's ambassador to Oman. He was the Principal of the Foreign Service Academy from August 2012 to January 2015.

After retirement, Kamal served as an Advisor to Kai-Altech Group and vice-chairman of Center for Science and Technology Diplomacy, based in Berlin, Dhaka, and Florida.
