= Muhammad Abdul Muhith =

Bangladeshi diplomat

- মুহাম্মদ আবদুল মুহিত
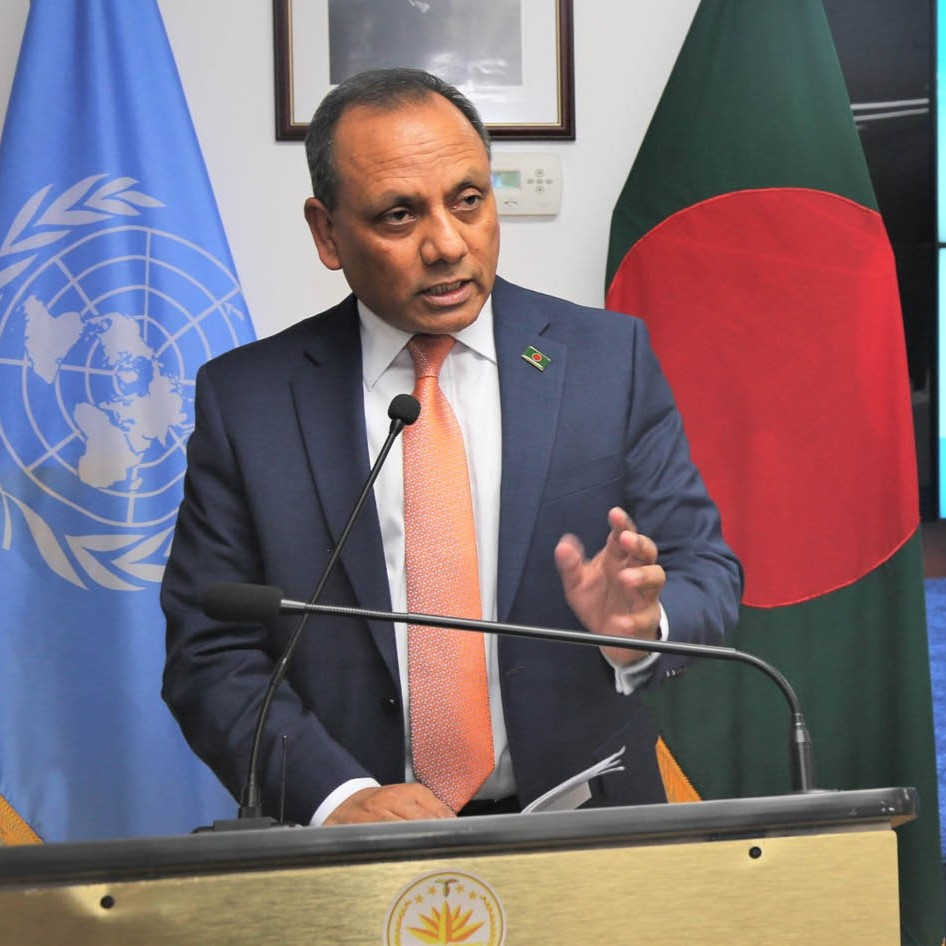
- Muhith speaking at an event organized by the Permanent Mission of Bangladesh to the United Nations in New York City (2022)

High Commissioner of Bangladesh to the United Kingdom
- Incumbent
- Assumed office 24 August 2026
- President: Mirza Fakhrul Islam Alamgir
- Prime Minister: Tarique Rahman
- Preceded by: Abida Islam

Permanent Representative of Bangladesh to the United Nations
- In office July 2022 – 13 January 2025
- Preceded by: Rabab Fatima
- Succeeded by: Salahuddin Noman Chowdhury

Ambassador of Bangladesh to Austria
- In office 22 July 2020 – 21 July 2022
- Preceded by: Abu Zafar
- Succeeded by: Asad Alam Siam

Ambassador of Bangladesh to Denmark
- In office 31 August 2015 – 14 July 2020
- Preceded by: Position created
- Succeeded by: M Allama Siddiki

Personal details
- Education: University of Dhaka

Muhammad Abdul Muhith is a Bangladeshi diplomat. He served as the Permanent Representative of Bangladesh to the United Nations (UN) in New York from July 2022 to 13 January 2025. He previously served in numerous posts for the Bangladesh Ministry of Foreign Affairs as a diplomat. He has been serving as the High Commissioner of Bangladesh to the United Kingdom since August 2026.

== Early life ==
Muhammad completed a BSS and MSS in Sociology from the University of Dhaka. He joined the Bangladesh Foreign Service in 1993 with the 11th batch of BCS (FA) cadre. He holds a diploma in the Arabic language from the University of Kuwait.

== Career ==
Muhith served in various Bangladesh missions, including as second secretary at the Embassy of Bangladesh in Kuwait, first secretary at the Embassy of Bangladesh in Rome, counsellor at the Doha Embassy of Bangladesh, and counsellor at the Permanent Mission of Bangladesh in New York. He was Deputy Chief of Mission, Embassy of Bangladesh in Washington D.C from 2012 to 2015. Then, he joined as the first Ambassador of Bangladesh to Denmark with concurrent accreditation to Estonia and Iceland until 2020. He then served as the Bangladesh ambassador to Austria with concurrent accreditation as ambassador to Hungary, Slovenia and Slovakia.

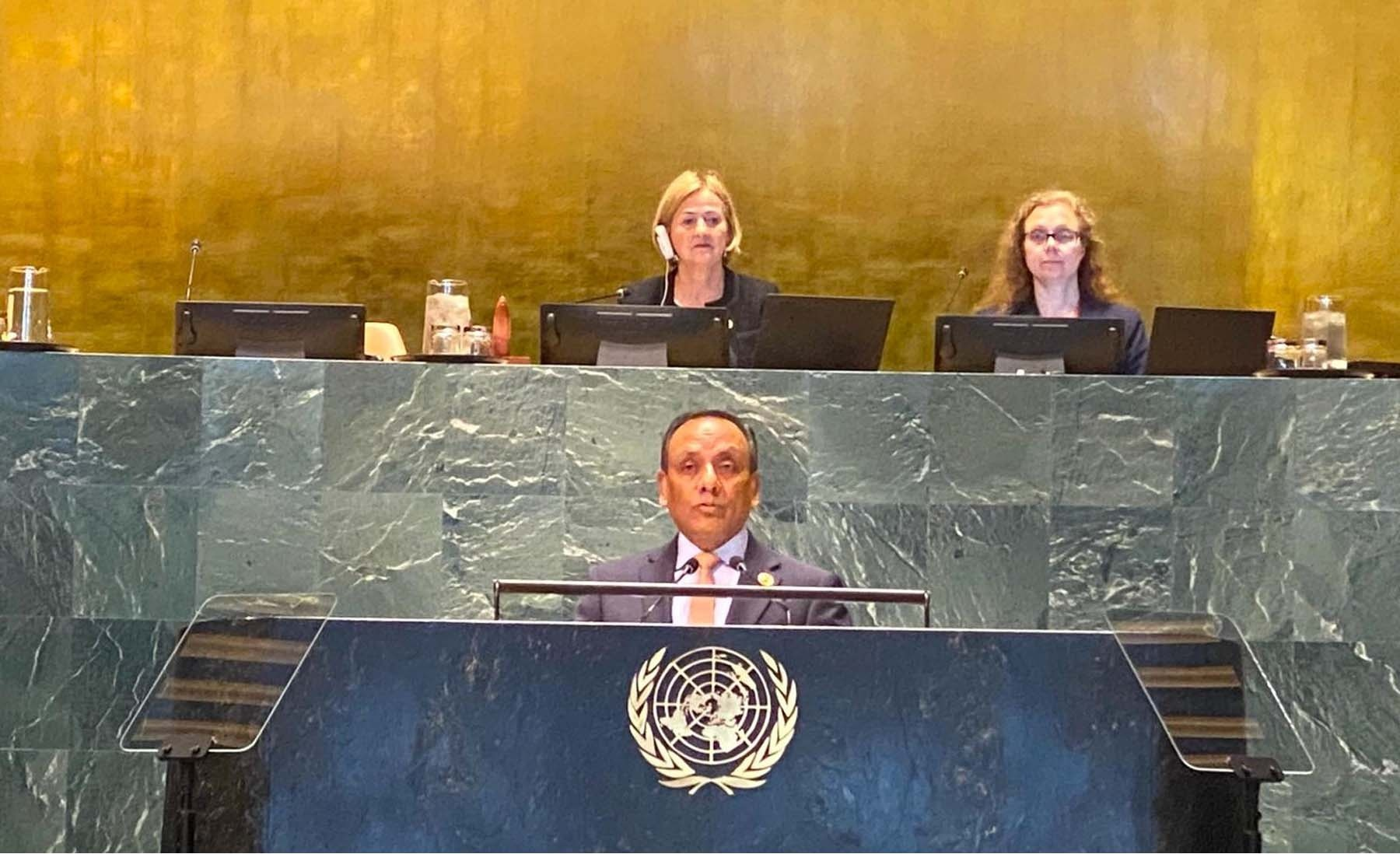
Muhit addressing the UN General Assembly, 2024, voicing support for the ICJ ruling on Israel's occupation of Palestine.

In July 2022 he became Permanent Representative of Bangladesh to the United Nations. He has since then served as the Chair of the United Nations Peacebuilding Commission and as the president of the executive board of United Nations Entity for Gender Equality and Empowerment of Women (UN Women). He was elected President of the Executive Board of UNDP, UNFPA, and UNOPS for 2024.

As representative, he has expressed concern about the atrocities and the death toll during the Gaza war, and called for an immediate ceasefire and welcomed the ruling of the International Court of Justice.

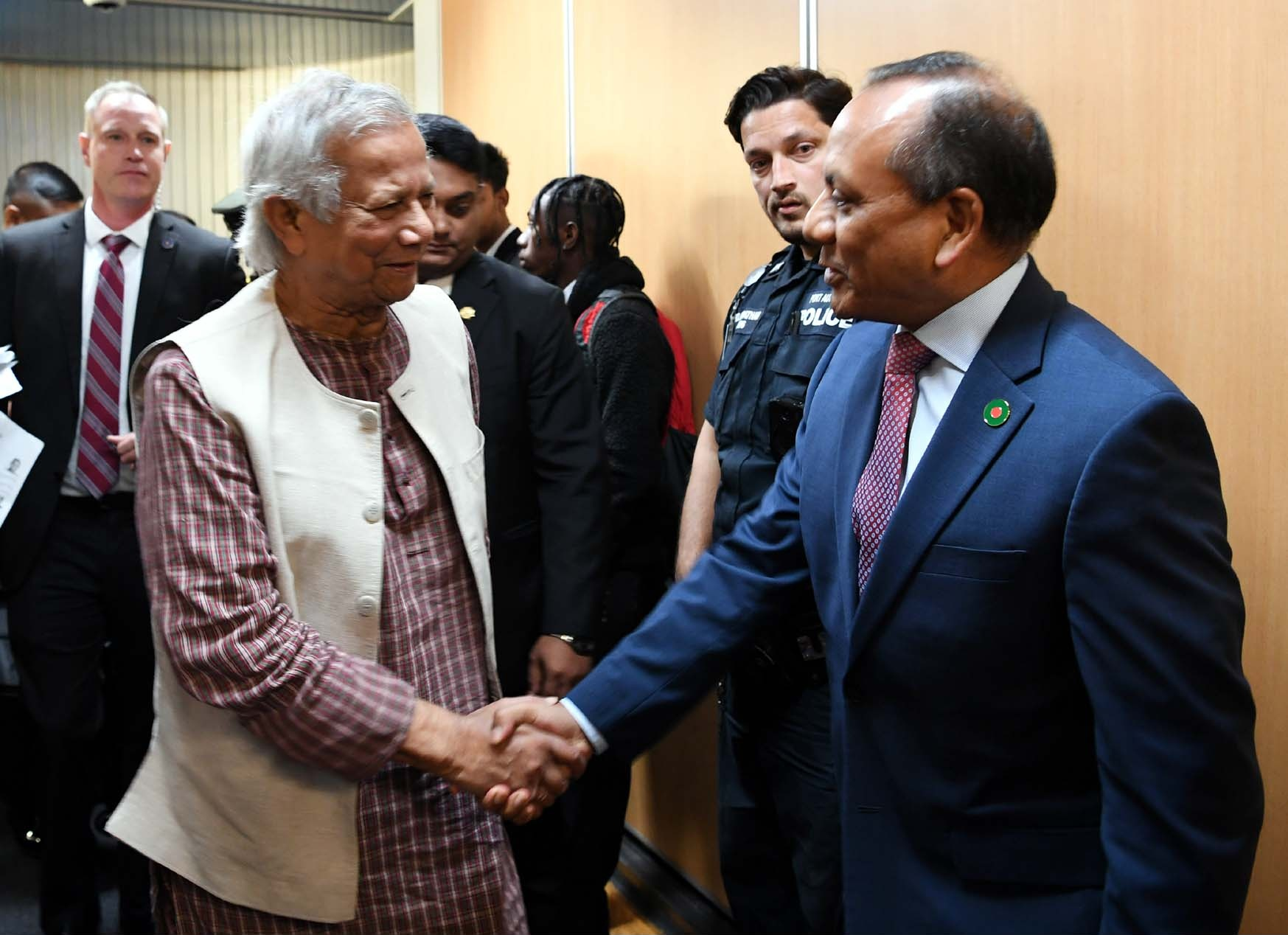
Muhith receiving Muhammad Yunus at John F. Kennedy International Airport in 2024.
