= Mohiuddin Ahmed (ambassador) =

Bangladeshi diplomat (1936–2025)

- মহিউদ্দিন আহমেদ

Ambassador of Bangladesh to Nepal
- In office 16 December 1996 – 10 November 1999
- Preceded by: Abul Hassan Mahmood Ali
- Succeeded by: Cyril Sikder

Personal details
- Born: 1936 Narsingdi, Bengal Province, British India
- Died: 6 March 2025 (aged 88–89) Dhaka, Bangladesh
- Spouse: Hasina Ahmed
- Education: University of Dhaka
- Occupation: Diplomat, freedom fighter

Mohiuddin Ahmed (1936 – 6 March 2025) was a Bangladeshi diplomat, veteran of the 1952 Language Movement and the Bangladesh Liberation War. He held various senior positions in the Ministry of Foreign Affairs and served as an ambassador to multiple countries.

== Early life and education ==
Ahmed was born in 1936 in Raipura Upazila, Narsingdi District, British India. He completed his higher education at the University of Dhaka, earning a degree in economics, followed by a master's degree in international relations. He had also participated in the 1952 Bengali language movement.

== Career ==
Ahmed joined the Pakistan Foreign Service in 1963. During the Bangladesh Liberation War in 1971, Ahmed was serving as trade commissioner at Pakistan's mission in Hong Kong. Ahmed defected in support of Bangladesh. He joined Bangladesh's diplomatic service after its independence. He held several important positions, including Acting Foreign Secretary, Deputy Chief of Protocol, Director of General Administration, and Additional Foreign Secretary.

Ahmed's overseas assignments included postings at Bangladeshi missions in New Delhi, Jakarta, and as Deputy High Commissioner in London. He served as ambassador to Nepal and Senegal, with concurrent accreditation to Mali, Côte d'Ivoire, Gambia, and Guinea. He served as the ambassador of Bangladesh to Nepal from 16 December 1996, replacing Abul Hassan Mahmood Ali, to 10 November 1999. Cyril Sikder replaced him.

Following his retirement from diplomatic service, Ahmed remained active in the financial sector. He was a director at Janata Bank, Bank Asia, and Nabil Bank in Nepal. He also served as an advisor to the Rangs Group. Before joining the foreign service, Ahmed was involved in journalism and photography. He contributed to the British Information Service and wrote for local publications, including The Daily Ittefaq and Begum magazine.

== Personal life ==
Ahmed was married to Hasina Ahmed. They had two daughters, Parveen, a journalist, Nasmeen, a teacher, and, a son, Asif Ahmed, a lawyer.

== Death ==
Ahmed died on 6 March 2025 at the age of 88 in a hospital in Dhaka due to age-related complications. He was buried at Azimpur Graveyard.
