= Mizanur Rahman Manu =

Bangladeshi politician

Member of Bangladesh Parliament
- In office 1991–1996
- Preceded by: Mohammed Sakhawat Rahman
- Succeeded by: Mizanur Rahman Manu
- In office 1996–2001
- Preceded by: Mizanur Rahman Manu
- Succeeded by: Akhtaruzzaman Mia

President of Bangladesh Cycling Federation
- Succeeded by: Shafiullah Al Munir

Personal details
- Political party: Bangladesh Awami League

Mizanur Rahman Manu is a Bangladesh Awami League politician and a former member of parliament for Dinajpur-4.

== Career ==
Manu was elected to parliament from Dinajpur-4 as a Bangladesh Awami League candidate in 1991 and 1996. He is a former whip of the parliament of Bangladesh.
