= Tareq Ahmed (diplomat) =

Bangladeshi diplomat (born 1972)

- তারেক আহমেদ

Ambassador of Bangladesh to the United Arab Emirates
- Incumbent
- Assumed office December 2024
- Preceded by: Abu Zafar

Personal details
- Born: 4 September 1972 (age 54) Bangladesh
- Spouse: Ummey Rumman
- Children: 2
- Education: University of Dhaka

Tareq Ahmed (born 4 September 1972) is a Bangladeshi career diplomat currently serving as the ambassador of Bangladesh to the United Arab Emirates. He was the Charge De Affaires of the Bangladesh Embassy in Sudan.

== Early life and education ==
Ahmed was born in Bangladesh on 4 September 1972. He completed his SSC in 1988 and HSC in 1990. He earned his bachelor's and master's in soil science from the University of Dhaka. His master's thesis focused on “Potassium Release Characteristics of Soil as influenced by Mineralogy.”

== Career ==
Ahmed joined the Ministry of Foreign Affairs on 25 January 1999 as an Assistant Secretary. He began his diplomatic service with postings in Manila, Brussels, New York, Moscow, and Beijing, gradually rising through the ranks. In Manila, he worked on bilateral issues with the Philippines and international organizations such as the ADB and IRRI. In Brussels, he was engaged in multilateral and European affairs and served concurrently with Luxembourg and Switzerland.

In 2009, Ahmed joined the Permanent Mission of Bangladesh to the United Nations in New York as Counsellor, working on Second and First Committee issues such as LDCs, climate change, and disarmament. He later served in the embassies in Moscow and Beijing, overseeing relations with countries like Mongolia, North Korea, and several post-Soviet states.

From 2015 to 2018, Ahmed served as Director General in various capacities in Dhaka, including External Publicity, SAARC, BIMSTEC, and West Asia. He was promoted to C-Grade Ambassador in 2017. Between 2018 and 2021, he served as Deputy High Commissioner in Canberra, covering Australia, New Zealand, and Fiji. From 2021 to 2023, Ahmed was posted as Chargé d'Affaires to Sudan, where he led the opening of a new mission, which was later closed due to war.

In November 2023, Ahmed returned to Dhaka to serve as Director General at the Ministry of Foreign Affairs. In December 2024, he was appointed as the Ambassador of Bangladesh to the United Arab Emirates. He held a meeting with the Pakistan Ambassador Faisal Niaz Tirmizi in Abu Dhabi in January 2025. He hosted chief advisor Muhammad Yunus of the Interim government in February 2024.

== Personal life ==
Ahmed is married to Ummey Rumman. They have two sons, Prochchhanno Muntaha Ahmad and Pantho Muntad Ahmad.
