= High Commission of Bangladesh, London =

Diplomatic mission of Bangladesh to the United Kingdom

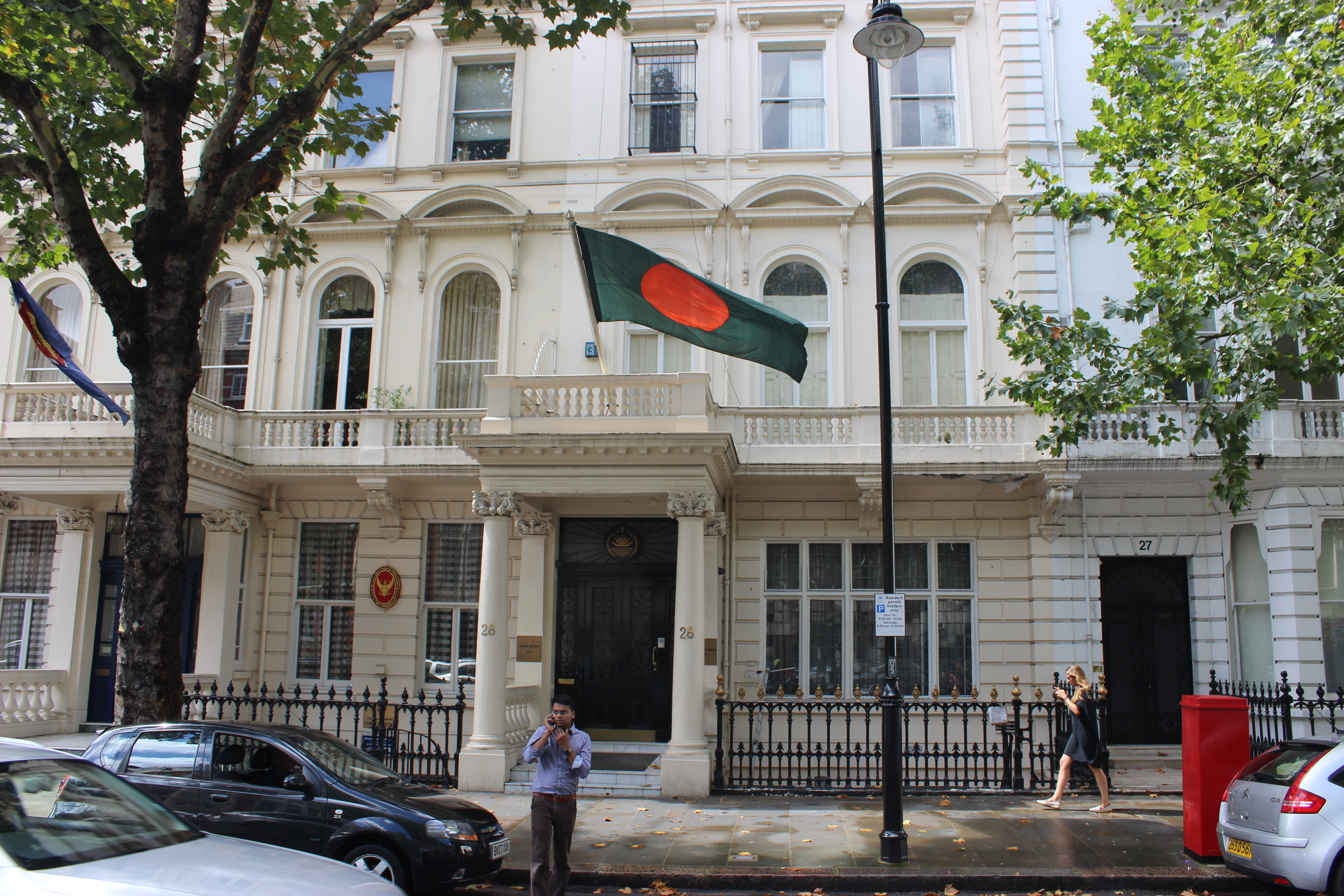
- High Commission of Bangladesh, London
- Address: 28 Queens Gate, London, SW7 5JA, UK
- Coordinates: 51°29′53.88″N 0°10′48.72″W
- Jurisdiction: United Kingdom
- High Commissioner: Muhammad Abdul Muhith
- Website: Official website

Listed Building – Grade II
- Official name: 27-35, Queen's Gate SW7
- Designated: 15 April 1969
- Reference no.: 1226094

The High Commission of Bangladesh, London is the diplomatic mission of Bangladesh to the United Kingdom. The High Commission is located on the Queen's Gate street of South Kensington in London. The Government of Bangladesh also operates two Assistant High Commissions located in Manchester and Birmingham. Moreover, it has concurrent accreditation to Ireland.

The incumbent High Commissioner is Muhammad Abdul Muhith who assumed the role in August 2026 . The building, alongside the Royal Thai Embassy, is a Grade II listed building.

== Gallery ==
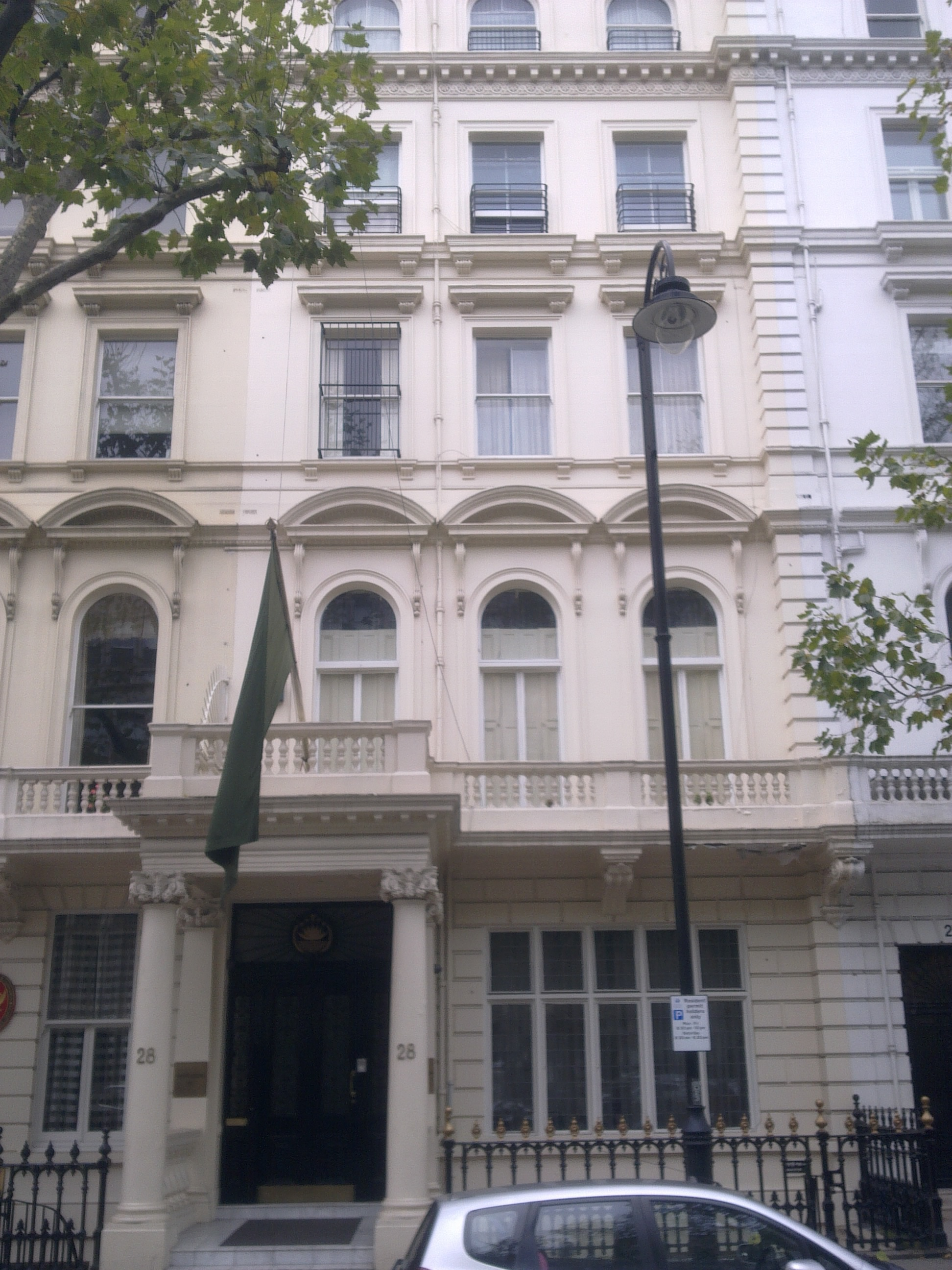
A façade of the High Commission on Queen's Gate

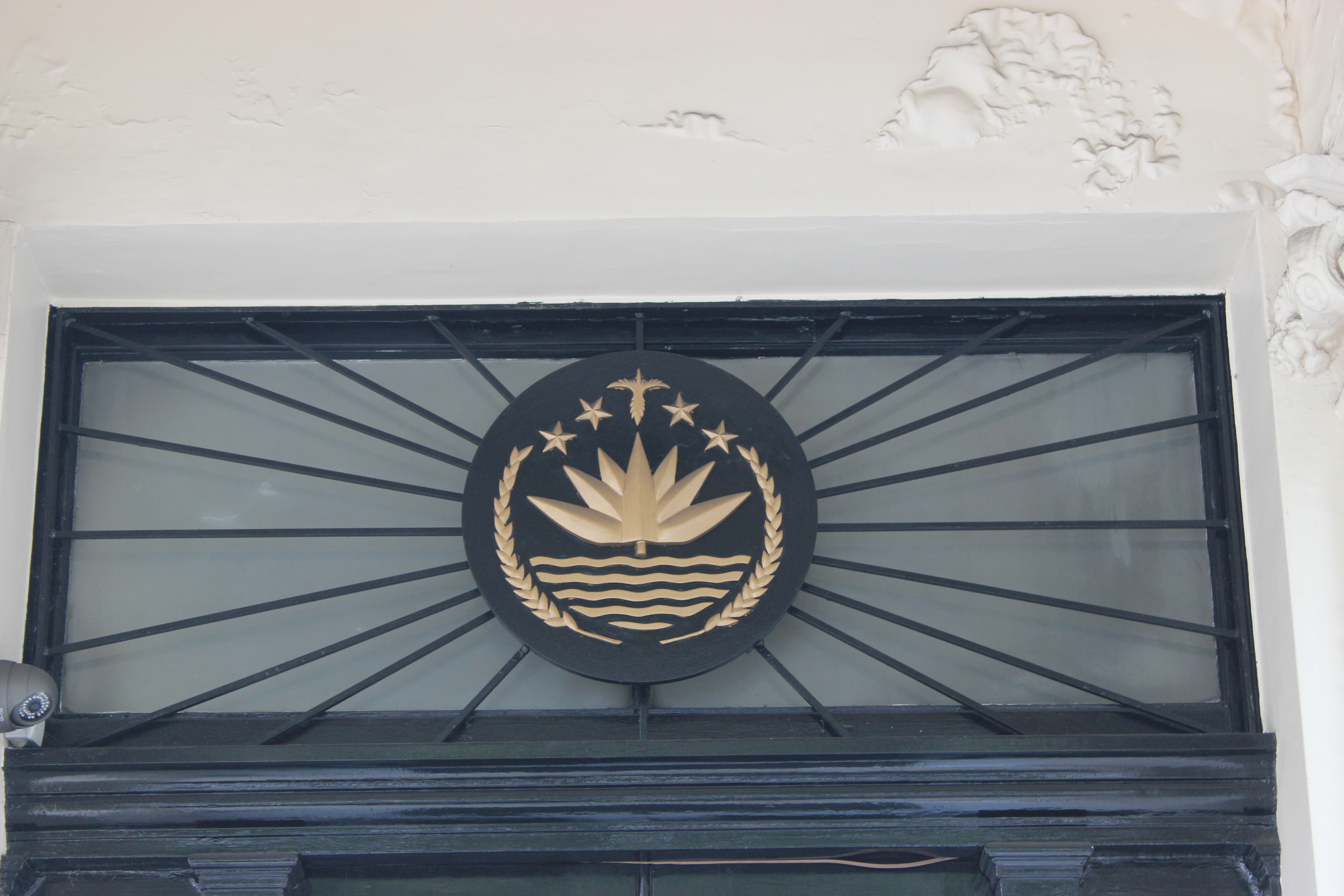
The National Emblem of Bangladesh on the transom of the High Commission

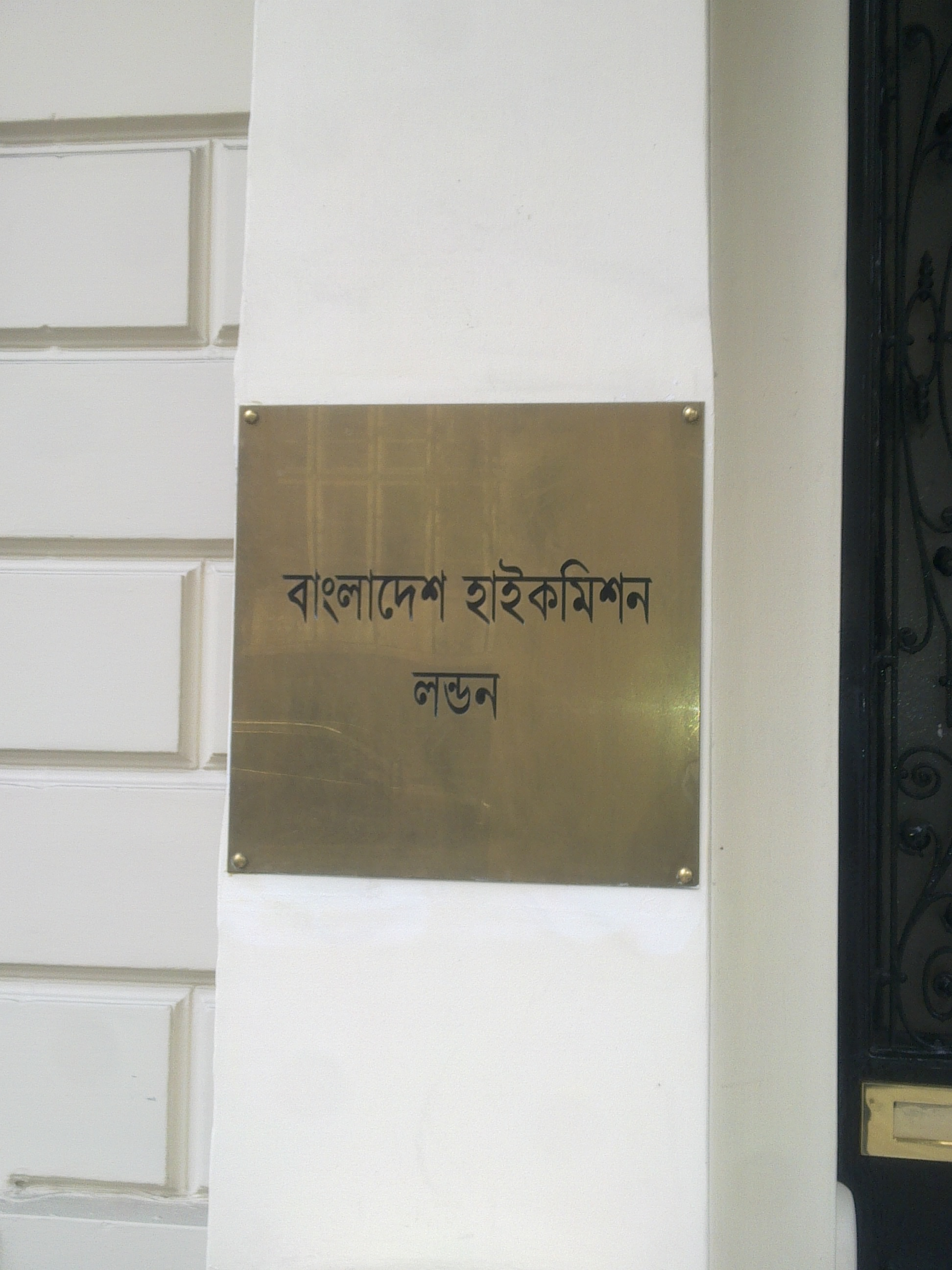
Plaque in Bengali

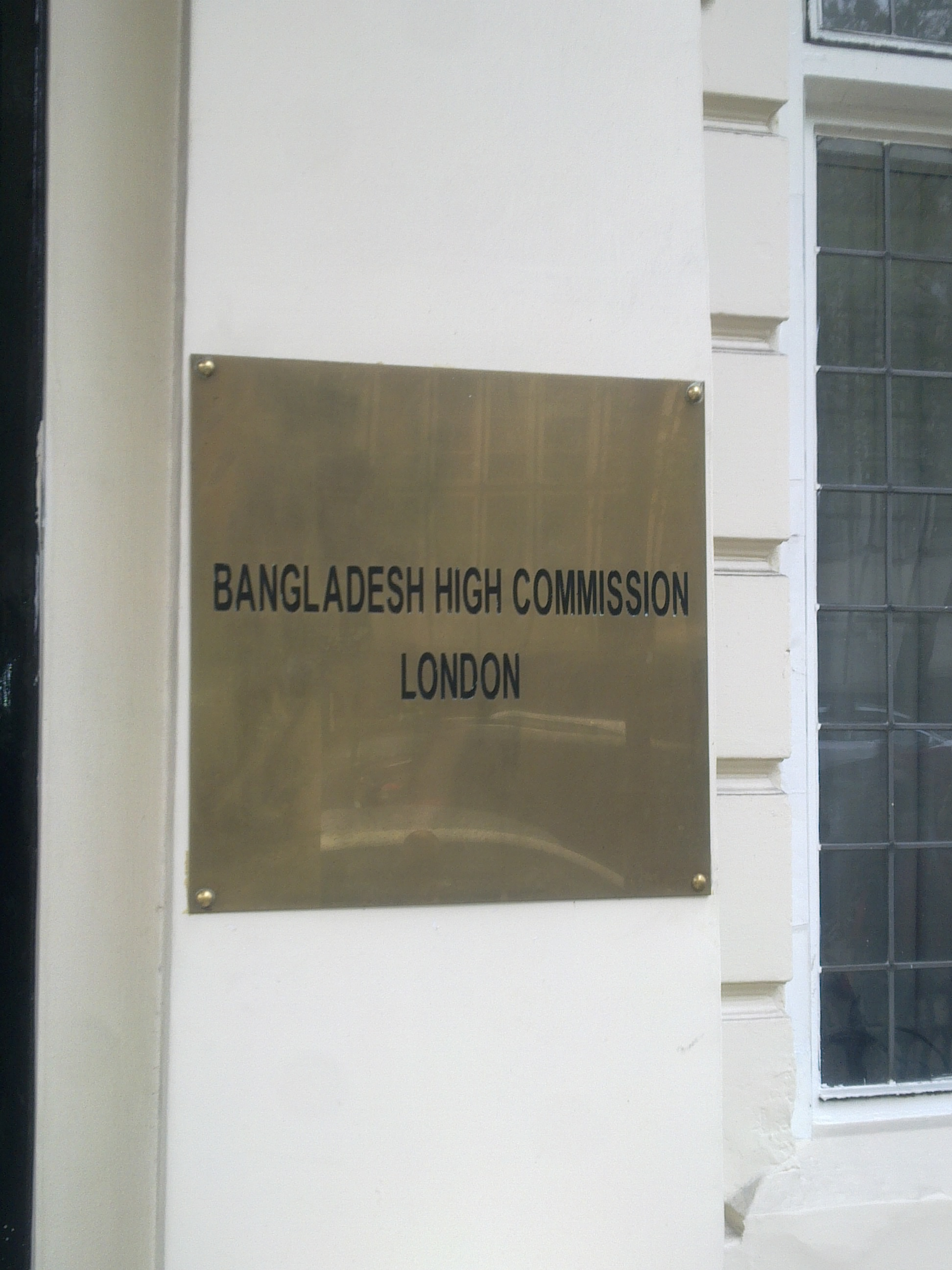
Plaque in English
