= Iftikharul Karim =

Bangladeshi diplomat

Ambassador Iftikharul Karim

Personal details
- Education: University of Dhaka (Honours); University of Karachi (Master’s)
- Occupation: Diplomat
- Awards: Order of the Diplomatic Service Merit (Gwanghwa Medal)

Military service
- Years of service: Pakistan Foreign Service; Bangladesh Civil Service (Foreign Affairs)

Iftikharul Karim is a retired Bangladeshi diplomat who served in the former Pakistan Foreign Service and later in the Bangladesh Foreign Service. He held senior diplomatic postings in Europe, North America, and East Asia, including appointments as Ambassador of Bangladesh to South Korea, North Korea, and China.

== Early life ==
Karim completed his undergraduate studies in Physics at the University of Dhaka. He later obtained a Master’s degree from the University of Karachi. From 1978 to 1980, he participated in the Fulbright Exchange Program at the Institute of International Studies, University of South Carolina. His father was photographer G. M. M. E. Karim (died in 1999).

== Career ==
Karim entered diplomatic service as a member of the Pakistan Foreign Service before Bangladesh's independence. Following 1971, he joined the Bangladesh Civil Service (Foreign Affairs cadre) and served at the Ministry of Foreign Affairs in Dhaka.

Karim's early overseas assignments included postings at Bangladesh missions in Stockholm, Ankara, and the Permanent Mission of Bangladesh in Geneva. He later served in Washington, D.C., where he held the position of Political Minister and Deputy Chief of Mission at the Embassy of Bangladesh.

Karim was subsequently posted to Seoul and Beijing in senior diplomatic roles. From 2000 to 2002, he served as Bangladesh's Ambassador to South Korea. In 2002, the Government of South Korea awarded him the Order of the Diplomatic Service Merit (Gwanghwa Medal) in recognition of his contribution to strengthening bilateral relations between Bangladesh and South Korea.

Karim was later appointed Ambassador of Bangladesh to the People’s Republic of China from 2002 to 2003. During this tenure, he was concurrently accredited as Ambassador to Mongolia and the Democratic People’s Republic of Korea.

Karim is a member of The Dhaka Forum.
