= Molla Waheeduzzaman =

Bangladeshi civil servant

Molla Waheeduzzaman was a retired senior secretary and former chairman of the Privatization Commission, with the rank of State Minister. He is a former secretary of the Prime Minister's Office of Prime Minister Sheikh Hasina.

== Career ==
Waheeduzzaman was the director general of the Directorate General of Food in 2008. He led a three-member delegation to Kolkata to discuss importing rice from India. He signed a deal with West Bengal Essential Commodities Supplies Cooperative Limited to buy 500 thousand ton of rice.

In 2009, the Embassy of the United States, Dhaka and ambassador James F Moriarty accused Waheeduzzaman of attempting to sabotage a deal for Biman Bangladesh Airlines to buy Boeing aircraft.

Waheeduzzaman was the secretary of the Prime Minister's Office in 2011. He, Abdus Sobhan Sikder and Md. Ashraful Moqbul, were top contenders for the post of principal secretary of Prime Minister Sheikh Hasina.

In February 2014, Waheeduzzaman was appointed chairman of the Privatization Commission and Abul Kalam Azad replaced him at the Prime Minister's Office. He replaced Mirza Abdul Jalil as chairman.

Liberation War Affairs Minister AKM Mozammel Huq removed Waheeduzzaman's freedom fighter certificate, which certified he had fought in the Bangladesh Liberation War, as it was obtained through forgery in 2015. Three other senior civil servants, Public Service Commission secretary AKM Amir Hossain, Ministry of Liberation War Affairs secretary K. H. Masud Siddiqui, Ministry of Health secretary M. M. Neaz Uddin Miah and Ministry of Liberation War Affairs joint secretary Abul Kashem Talukder were identified as having fake certificates like Waheeduzzaman. The Anti-Corruption Commission began its own investigation into the allegations. The Awami League government after coming to power in 2009 revoked the certificates of 182 government officials who had obtained them through forgery to secure government jobs.

Waheeduzzaman left the Privatisation Commission in 2016 when it was merged with Board of Investment to create the Bangladesh Investment Development Authority. Syed Abdus Samad resigned from the Board of Investment and Kazi M Aminul Islam was appointed chairman of the new Bangladesh Investment Development Authority. In 2017, the Prothom Alo reported he was still using his official driver, Abul Kalam Hawladar, from the Directorate General of Food violating service rules.

In November 2023, Waheeduzzaman signed a statement critical of the Office of the High Commissioner for Human Rights statement criticizing government action against protestors.
