= Shaikh Yusuf Harun =

Bangladeshi government official

Executive Chairman Bangladesh Economic Zones Authority
- In office 7 July 2021 – 4 July 2024
- Prime Minister: Sheikh Hasina
- Preceded by: Paban Chowdhury
- Succeeded by: Md Sarwar Bari

Senior Secretary Ministry of Public Administration
- In office 6 January 2020 – 14 May 2021
- Prime Minister: Sheikh Hasina
- Preceded by: Faiz Ahmed
- Succeeded by: K M Ali Azam

Personal details
- Born: 15 May 1962 (age 64) Assasuni Upazila, Satkhira District, Bangladesh
- Citizenship: Bangladesh
- Education: University of Rajshahi
- Profession: Government official

Shaikh Yusuf Harun is a retired Bangladeshi government official who served as the Executive Chairman of Bangladesh Economic Zones Authority. He is the former Senior Secretary at the Ministry of Public Administration. Earlier, he served as Deputy Commissioner of Dhaka District.

== Early life ==
Harun was born on 15 May 1962 into a Bengali Muslim family of Shaikhs of Dargahpur Village, Assasuni Upazila, Satkhira District, East Pakistan, Pakistan. His father's name is Shaikh Aminur Rahman and his mother's name is Aklima Khatun. In 1978, he completed his S.S.C. from Paikgacha High School and in 1980 his H.S.C. from Brajalal College. He completed his bachelor's and master's in Applied Chemistry from the University of Rajshahi in 1984 and 1985 respectively.

== Career ==
Harun had served as the Assistant Commissioner, Additional Deputy Commissioner, and Upazila Nirbahi Officer after joining the Bangladesh Civil Service in 1986 as part of the 8th BCS exam batch. He served as the 1st class magistrate and Senior Assistant Commissioner in Sunamganj District. He had served as the Deputy Commissioner and District Magistrate of Gopalganj District. He was the Deputy Commissioner of Dhaka District in 2013 and 2014. He was part of the recovery effort following the 2013 Dhaka garment factory collapse at Rana Plaza in Savar Upazila. He was given the responsibility for finding a location for the headquarters of Rapid Action Battalion-10 after their original site was canceled due to it being part of an important channel of Buriganga River. He was part of commission formed to reclaimed the illegally occupied properties of Jagannath University in 2014. He had faced some criticism for leasing out land to Bangladesh Army on Buriganga River foreshore to construct Postogola Cantonment; he denied the land was foreshore.

Harun is the former General Secretary of the Bangladesh Administrative Service Association. In October 2020, the Election Commission of Bangladesh stated that it would file a case against Member of Parliament Nixon Chowdhury for violating the electoral code of conduct, after the lawmaker abused Harun, the then Faridpur deputy commissioner, and other local administration officials during phone conversations.

Harun had served for three years at the Prime Minister's Office. He had been the secretary at the Medical Education And Family Welfare Division of the Ministry of Health and Family Welfare in 2019. He was transferred as the secretary of the Ministry of Public Administration on 30 December 2019 from the Ministry of Health and Family Welfare. He served as the secretary and after promotion senior secretary at the Ministry of Public Administration. During his tenure, an order was issued that prevent government officials from speaking to the media without prior authorization in April 2020. He demoted the Deputy Commissioner of Jamalpur District, Ahmed Kabir, after a video showing inappropriate behavior between him and a female colleague went viral on social media in 2020. Harun also stated that Kabir will never be promoted again in the civil service.

On 7 July 2021, Harun was appointed the Chairperson of Bangladesh Economic Zones Authority for a three-year contract. Harun and the Principal Secretary to the Prime Minister of Bangladesh Ahmad Kaikaus inaugurated the Shreehatta Economic Zone by DBL Group in Sylhet on 24 August 2021. Harun told the media that he had received proposals from 153 investors for the Bangabandhu Sheikh Mujib Shilpa Nagar in Chittagong. He was a Director of Bangladesh Institute of Governance and Management.

== Publications ==
1. Freedom of the press and boundaries
2. An investigation into the launch accident and a recommendation
3. Tree plantation on the road island
4. Half Rent
5. Comrade Pir Habibur Rahman
6. I can't give anything for five years
