= Shamim Ahmed =

Shamim Ahmed may refer to:

- Rana Shamim Ahmed Khan, Pakistani politician
- Shamim Ahmad, Indian politician
- Shamim Ahmed (judge), Indian judge
- Shamim Ahmed Khan, sitarist and composer
- Shaikh Shamim Ahmed, Indian politician and social worker
- F. A. Shamim Ahmed, Bangladeshi diplomat
