= Mohammed Jakaria =

- মোহাম্মদ জকরিয়া
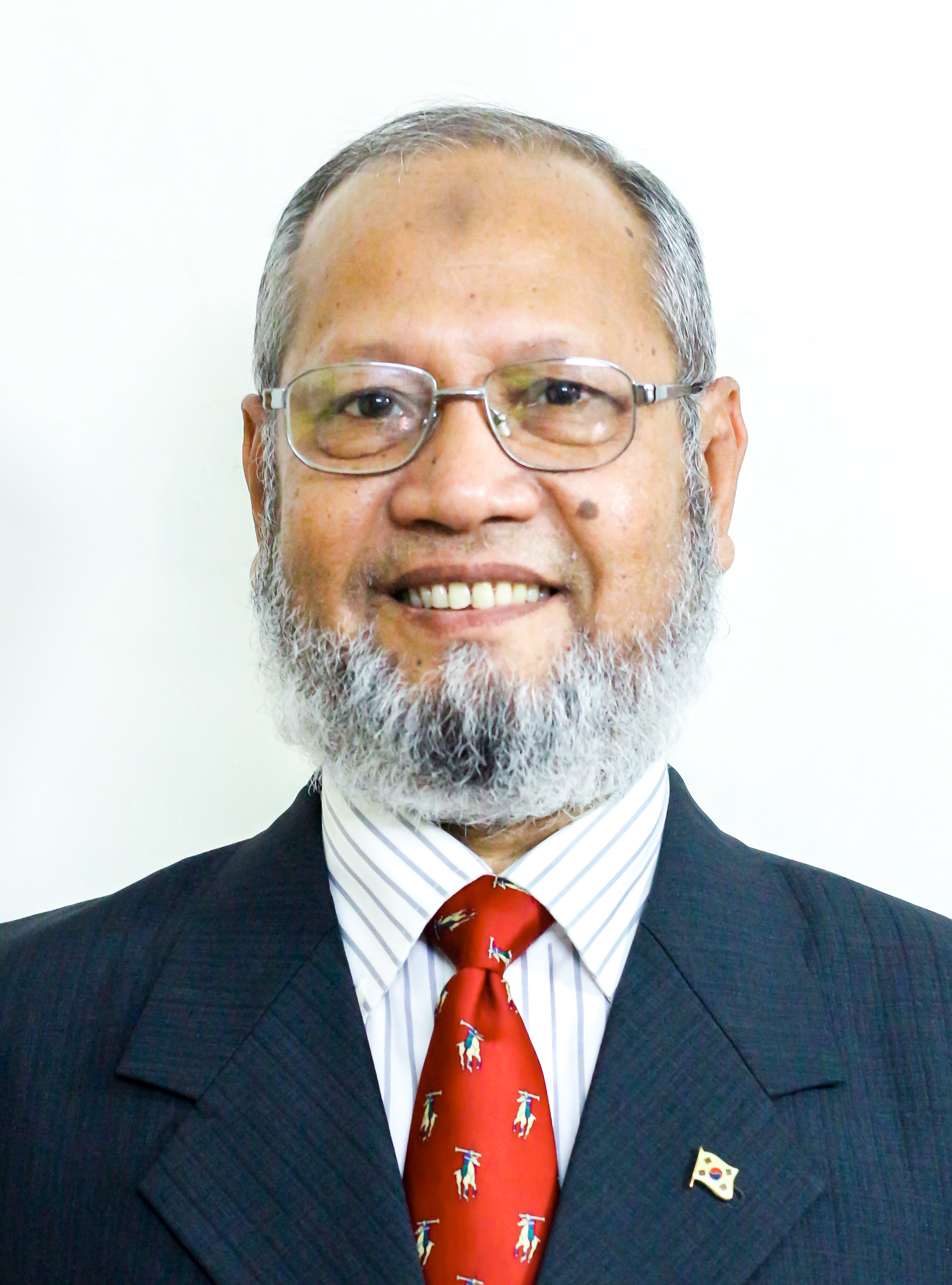

Director General of NGO Affairs Bureau
- Incumbent
- Assumed office 18 April 2026
- Prime Minister: Tarique Rahman

Personal details
- Born: 14 October 1957 (age 68) Chittagong District, East Pakistan (Now Bangladesh)
- Spouse: Sabiha Jakaria
- Children: Dr. Abir Shaqran Mahmood
- Education: University of Chittagong
- Occupation: Civil servant
- Known for: Civil bureaucrat, election specialist, researcher, writer and social worker
- Website: https://ngoab.gov.bd

Mohammed Jakaria (born 14 October 1957) is a Bangladeshi retired civil bureaucrat, election specialist, researcher, writer and social worker. He served as Director General of NGO Affairs Bureau under the Prime Minister's Office, with the rank of Secretary. Before that, he served as Additional Secretary and Secretary of Election Commission Secretariat.

== Birth & Education ==
He was born on 14 October 1957 in Banskhali, Chittagong District, East Pakistan, Pakistan (present-day Bangladesh). His father was Umrul Alam Master mother Zulaikha Alam. He completed SSC from Comilla Board in 1973 with first division and HSC from the same board in 1975. In 1978, he completed a BA (Honours) in History from University of Chittagong, securing first place and receiving a university scholarship. In 1979, he completed an MA in history from the same university, securing first place in first class. In 1984, he completed a B.Ed. from University of Chittagong, securing first place in first class and receiving the Vice-Chancellor's medal. In 2013, he obtained a PhD with a dissertation titled Election in Bangladesh: Voters' Participation and Public Acceptance (1973–2001).

== Career ==
Jakaria joined government service in 1984 as an assistant secretary at Election Commission Secretariat. He later served as senior assistant secretary, deputy election commissioner of Dhaka division, Director of Electoral Training Institute and deputy secretary for national and local government elections at Election Commission Secretariat. He also served as National Project Director of Voter ID/National Identity Card project. He served as joint secretary at Ministry of Public Administration and later as joint secretary of Election and Planning Division of Election Commission Secretariat. He also served as additional secretary and secretary of Election Commission Secretariat. Later, he served as Director General of NGO Affairs Bureau under Prime Minister's Office with the rank of Secretary.

== Other activities ==
During his student life, Jakaria was involved in various organizational activities, including music and theatre. In 1999, he served as a member of National Curriculum Evaluation Committee of National Curriculum and Textbook Board.

In 2026, he served as a member of a national committee responsible for providing honorariums to khatibs, imams, muezzins and other religious representatives of mosques, temples, pagodas and churches.

He served as General Secretary of Chittagong Association Dhaka during 2008–2009. He also held several positions in Banshkhali Association Dhaka, including president, general secretary, adviser and chairman of the board of trustees.

Since 2024, he has served as a member of executive council of Officers Club, Dhaka and as a member of executive committee of Bangladesh Government Employees Welfare Association (Retired).

== Books ==
He has edited and published several books, including:

- Shataborshe Chattogram Samity (1912–2011), 2011
- Governor's Diary by Dr. Atiur Rahman, Governor of Bangladesh Bank, 2015
- Bangladesh's Economic Progress: From the Perspective of Dr. Kaushik Basu, 2016
- Zainul Haque Sikder: An Exceptional Personality, 2016

=== Published works ===
His published books include:

- Election: Cambodia and Bangladesh Perspective, 1994
- Chhonde Chattogramkosh, 2010
- Onubhober Dolay Jalkadarer Sampan, a collection of nostalgic poems, 2011
- Shomoyer Onuronon, a collection of essays, 2012
- Amar Bhabna Ghuri, 2012
- Nirbachoni Bichitra, 2014
- Nirbachoner Kotha, a children's book
- Chattogram Darpan
- Legal Framework Order and Last Election of Undivided Pakistan
- Bunojole Obogahon, a book of poems, 2013
- The Spirit of Independence in Chittagong: From Dampara to Kalurghat (1930–1971)
- Fairs and Festivals of Chittagong, 2017
- National Parliament Election Law Journey, 2001
- Babar Moner Aynay
- Dedicated to You, a book of poems
- Everything First in Banshkhali
- The Light of Islam, a children's book
- Chhonde Quran Kanika

== Personal life ==
His wife Sabiha Jakaria is a retired head teacher. They have one son Dr. Abir Shaqran Mahmood.

== See also ==
- NGO Affairs Bureau
