= Paban Chowdhury =

Bangladeshi civil servant

Paban Chowdhury is a retired civil servant and the former Chairman of the Bangladesh Economic Zones Authority (BEZA). He is the chief advisor of City Group. He was the Director General of the Prime Minister's Office of Prime Minister Sheikh Hasina.

== Career ==
Chowdhury was the Additional Secretary of the Prime Minister's Office. In January 2014, Chowdhury was part of an investigation team that looked at allegations of sexual harassment allegations against Md. Tauhedul Islam, the Bangladesh Consul General in Milan, by a coworker. The investigation team, which included Additional Secretary of the Ministry of Foreign Affairs Jishnu Roy Chowdhury and director Kazi Anarkoly, found evidence in favor of the allegations.

On 30 June 2014, Chowdhury was appointed chairman of the Bangladesh Economic Zones Authority. He was promoted to secretary in 2015. He was reappointed chairman on 28 June 2017. His term was again extended in 2019 for which he thanked Prime Minister Sheikh Hasina. He received a 200 million investment from Ashraful Haq Chowdhury of Star Infrastructure Dev. Consortium Limited for building industries at the Mirasharai Economic Zone. He launched a one stop service center for the BEZA.

Chowdhury announced plans to offer more incentives to encourage investments during the COVID-19 pandemic in Bangladesh. He removed registration fees for private economic zones. It received US$6 billion investment offers in 2020. He announced 43.67 billion BDT investment to develop National Special Economic Zone.

Chowdhury is the chief advisor of City Group. Following the fall of the Sheikh Hasina led Awami League government, he has been one of the accused in an attempted murder case, along with 52 other former secretaries, for alleged involvement in indiscriminate firing on protesters during the Students against Discrimination movement.
