= Jishnu Roy Chowdhury =

- জিষ্ণু রায় চৌধুরী

Ambassador of Bangladesh to Bhutan
- In office 24 January 2014 – 17 December 2019
- Preceded by: Imtiaz Ahmed
- Succeeded by: A. K. M. Shahidul Karim

Jishnu Roy Chowdhury is a Bangladeshi civil servant and former ambassador of Bangladesh to Bhutan. He is an advisor to Upay, United Commercial Bank PLC's mobile financial service provider. He is the former private secretary to the Minister of Foreign Affairs Dipu Moni.

== Career ==
Chowdhury joined the Bangladesh Civil Service in 1984.

Chowdhury was appointed private secretary to the foreign minister, Dipu Moni, in January 2009 after the Sheikh Hasina-led Awami League government took power. He was promoted to joint secretary in September 2009.

In November 2013, Chowdhury was appointed ambassador of Bangladesh to Bhutan. His appointment was described as a violation of the civil service rules. According to the rules, he should have been appointed by the Ministry of Public Administration and not the Ministry of Foreign Affairs. He hosted the Bangladesh U15 women's national team in August 2018 in Bhutan. He accompanied Prime Minister of Bhutan Lotay Tshering on his official trip to Bangladesh. He hosted Prime Minister Sheikh Hasina, who inaugurated the foundation stone of the chancery for the embassy of Bangladesh in Bhutan. He signed a lease agreement with Pema Chewang, secretary of the National Land Commission.

Chowdhury was part of an investigation team that looked at sexual harassment allegations against Tauhedul Islam, the Bangladesh Consul General in Milan, by a coworker. The investigation team, which included Director of the Ministry of Foreign Affairs Kazi Anarkoly and Additional Secretary of the Prime Minister's Office Paban Chowdhury, found evidence in favor of the allegations.

Chowdhury is an advisor to Upay, United Commercial Bank's mobile financial service provider.
