= A. B. M. Abdus Sattar =

Secretary of the government of Bangladesh

- এ. বি. এম. আব্দুস সাত্তার
- Sattar in 2026

Principal Secretary to the Prime Minister
- Incumbent
- Assumed office 17 February 2026
- Prime Minister: Tarique Rahman
- Preceded by: Md. Siraj Uddin Miah

Personal details
- Born: 2 November 1955 (age 70) Bogura, East Pakistan
- Education: University of Rajshahi (BA, MA, LLB)
- Occupation: Civil servant

A. B. M. Abdus Sattar is a secretary of the government of Bangladesh. He is currently the principal secretary to the prime minister of Bangladesh. He was the personal secretary to the chairperson of the Bangladesh Nationalist Party and former Prime Minister Khaleda Zia.

== Career ==
Sattar joined the administration cadre of the Bangladesh Civil Service in 1984.

Sattar was promoted to joint secretary in June 2004 while serving as the DC of Dinajpur District.

In April 2015, Sattar handed over an Eid card from former Prime Minister Khaleda Zia to Prime Minister Sheikh Hasina. He was injured that month in an attack by activists of the Awami League on a motorcade of Khaleda Zia while she was campaigning for Tabith Awal for the Dhaka North City Corporation mayoral election. In 2016, he went to Hajj with Khaleda Zia.

In 2018, Sattar hired Blue Star Strategies and Rasky Partners to lobby the President Donald J. Trump administration on behalf of the Bangladesh Nationalist Party, according to Politico. Both he and the Bangladesh Nationalist Party denied the report. In 2023, he sought permission from the government to take Khaleda Zia abroad for medical treatment.

Sattar is the personal secretary to the chairperson of the Bangladesh Nationalist Party and former Prime Minister Khaleda Zia. He is the President of the BCS (Administration) Welfare Multi-purpose Cooperative Society Limited. After the fall of the Sheikh Hasina-led Awami League government, he took over the Officer's Club in Dhaka. He is the self-declared general secretary of the Officers Club, Dhaka. He cancelled a book launch by Kazi Kayum Shishir, Director of the Department of Inspection and Audit, on Khaleda Zia.

In December 2024, he called for the removal of the head of the Public Administration Reform Commission Abdul Muyeed Chowdhury. He is the president of the Baisamya Birodhi Karmachari Oikya Forum, an anti-discrimination forum of civil servants, and has called for an end to contractual appointments in the civil administration. In June 2025, he was present at the handover of a house in Gulshan to Khaleda Zia by the advisor of the Ministry of Housing and Public Works Adilur Rahman Khan and Rajdhani Unnayan Kartripakkha Chairman Riazul Islam.

In August 2025, Sattar accused eight advisors of the Muhammad Yunus led interim government of being corrupt and questioned the competence of health advisor Nurjahan Begum. The interim government asked him for evidence and denied his allegations. He is a director of Rupali Bank Limited. He took control and declared himself general secretary of the Officers Club, Dhaka after the fall of the Sheikh Hasina-led Awami League government. He is the president of BCS (Admn) Welfare Multipurpose Cooperative Society Limited and the Anti-Discrimination Employees' Unity Forum.
