= Sabrang =

Sabrang may refer to:

- Sabrang Communications, an Indian magazine publisher
- Sabrang Digest, a Pakistani Urdu digest
- Sabrang Film Awards, an Indian awards ceremony for Bhojpuri cinema
- Sabrang Union, a union in Teknaf Upazila, Cox's Bazar District, Bangladesh
  - Sabrang Tourism Park, a special economic zone in Sabrang Union
- Sabrang Utsav, an Indian classical music festival
