= F. A. Shamim Ahmed =

Bangladeshi diplomat (born 1948)

High Commissioner of Bangladesh to Pakistan
- In office 30 May 2003 – 4 May 2007
- Preceded by: Alimul Haque
- Succeeded by: Yasmeen Murshed

Ambassador of Bangladesh to the Netherlands
- In office 1 May 2001 – 23 May 2003
- Preceded by: Gyash Uddin
- Succeeded by: Liaquat Ali Chowdhury

Personal details
- Born: 1948 (age 77–78)

F. A. Shamim Ahmed is a retired diplomat and former High Commissioner of Bangladesh to Pakistan.

== Early life ==
Ahmed was born in 1948. He completed his undergrad and graduate studies in sociology from the University of Dhaka.

== Career ==
Ahmed joined the University of Chittagong as a lecturer. He joined the foreign service branch of the Bangladesh Civil Service in 1974.

Ahmed played a crucial role in the signing of the Ganges Water Treaty in 1997 between India and Bangladesh. From 1997 to 2000, he was the Deputy Permanent Representative of Bangladesh to the United Nations. He was the Consul General of Bangladesh in New York.

Ahmed was the Director General of the South Asia desk in the Ministry of Foreign Affairs. He was the Counsellor Alternate Permanent Representative to FAO Rome.

From 1 May 2001 to 23 May 2003, Ahmed was the Ambassador of Bangladesh to the Netherlands. He had succeeded Gyash Uddin as ambassador and was replaced by Liaquat Ali Choudhury.

From 30 May 2003 to 4 May 2007, Ahmed was the High Commissioner of Bangladesh to Pakistan. He called for Pakistan to reduce tariff on Bangladeshi exports during a trip by Foreign Secretary Shamsher M Chowdhury. The Minister of Foreign Affairs M Morshed Khan visited Pakistan while he was posted. He retired in May. He served as the Director of the Centre for Foreign Affairs Studies. He founded the centre after his retirement with Ambassador Ashfaqur Rahman and Ambassador M Serajul Islam.

Ahmed is a director of GSP Finance Company (Bangladesh) Limited and GSP Investments Limited. He is a member of the Officers Club, Dhaka.
