= Lokman Hossain Miah =

Bangladeshi civil servant

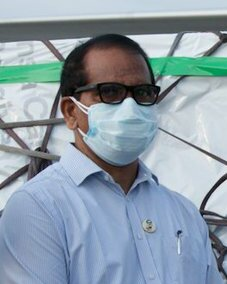
- Lokman in 2021

Executive Chairman of Bangladesh Investment Development Authority
- In office 4 September 2022 – 13 September 2024
- Prime Minister: Sheikh Hasina
- Preceded by: Md Sirazul Islam
- Succeeded by: Ashik Chowdhury

Senior Secretary of Health Services Division
- In office 5 April 2021 – 14 June 2022
- Prime Minister: Sheikh Hasina
- Succeeded by: Dr. Muhammad Anwar Hossain Howlader

Personal details
- Born: 15 June 1963 (age 63) Gournadi Upazila, Barisal District, East Pakistan, Pakistan
- Education: University of Dhaka

Lokman Hossain Miah is a civil servant and former executive chairman of the Bangladesh Investment Development Authority. He is the former Secretary of the Ministry of Textiles and Jute. He is the former Senior Secretary of the Health Services Division at the Ministry of Health and Family Welfare.

== Early life ==
Miah was born on 15 June 1963 in Gournadi Upazila, Barisal District, East Pakistan, Pakistan. He got his Master's in History from the University of Dhaka.

== Career ==
In 1986, Miah joined the Bangladesh Civil Service as an admin cadre.

Miah was the deputy director of Bureau of Manpower Employment and Training in 2007.

In 2010 and 2011, Miah was the Deputy Commissioner of Mymensingh District.

Hossain served as director of Civil Aviation Authority of Bangladesh and Ministry of Expatriates' Welfare and Overseas Employment. He is a former general manager of Jiban Bima Corporation. He is a former board member of Bangladesh Power Development Board.

He was the secretary of the National Curriculum and Textbook Board. He is a former Additional Secretary of the Ministry of Shipping.

Hossain was the Secretary of the Ministry of Textiles and Jute.

On 5 April 2021, Miah was appointed Secretary of the Health Services Division at the Ministry of Health and Family Welfare during the second wave of the COVID-19 pandemic in Bangladesh. He replaced Abdul Mannan who was infected with COVID-19. He was promoted to senior secretary in June.

On 23 August 2022, Miah's retirement was postponed. He was appointed chairman of the Bangladesh Investment Development Authority in September for a three-year term. He replaced Md Sirazul Islam. He is the chairman of National Advisory Board for Impact Investment in Bangladesh.

Ashik Chowdhury replaced him as chairman in September 2024. After the fall of the Sheikh Hasina led Awami League government, a murder case was filed against him by Bangladesh Nationalist Party politician Mohammad Zaman Hossain Khan over the death of a protestor in July 2024.
