= Masum Ahmed Chowdhury =

Bangladeshi diplomat (c.1943–2012)

High Commissioner of Bangladesh to Pakistan
- In office 19 August 1998 – 19 September 1999
- Preceded by: Q. A. M. A. Rahim
- Succeeded by: Alimul Haque

High Commissioner of Bangladesh to Sri Lanka
- In office 1 December 1995 – 12 August 1998
- Preceded by: Shamsher M. Chowdhury
- Succeeded by: Ashraf-ud-Doula

Personal details
- Born: 1943
- Died: 19 March 2012 (aged 68–69) Bethesda, Maryland, United States
- Education: University of Dhaka; Bangladesh University of Engineering and Technology

Masum Ahmed Chowdhury (c. 1943 – 19 March 2012) was a Bangladeshi diplomat. He served as a High Commissioner of Bangladesh to Maldives, Pakistan, and Sri Lanka.

== Early life ==
Born c. 1943, Choudhury studied at St. Gregory's High School. He graduated from the University of Dhaka and Bangladesh University of Engineering and Technology.

== Career ==
Chowdhury taught history in Bangladesh University of Engineering and Technology and Jagannath College in 1960s. He joined the information cadre after passing the Central Superior Services examination of Pakistan. After the Independence of Bangladesh, he joined the Foreign Service of Bangladesh.

In 1977, Chowdhury served as the second secretary at the embassy of Bangladesh in Kenya.

Chowdhury served as the High Commissioner of Bangladesh to Maldives. On 1 December 1995, he was appointed the High Commissioner of Bangladesh to Sri Lanka replacing Shamsher M Chowdhury. He served until 12 August 1998 and was replaced by Ashraf-ud-Doula. He had served as President of the Colombo Plan Council.

From 19 August 1998 to 19 September 1999, Chowdhury served as the High Commissioner of Bangladesh to Pakistan.

== Personal life ==
Chowdhury's parents were Ghyasuddin Ahmed Chowdhury and Rafiqunnesa Khatun Chowdhury. Chowdhurys brothers were Faruq Ahmed Choudhury, Iftekhar Ahmed Chowdhury and Enam Ahmed Choudhury. He had two sisters, Nasim Hai who was married to Syed Abdul Hai and Nina Ahmed who was married to Fakhruddin Ahmed.

Chowdhury was married to Naseema Chowdhury, who died on 17 December 2022 at Johns Hopkins Hospital. They had two sons.

== Death ==
Chowdhury died on 19 March 2012 in Suburban Hospital, Bethesda, Maryland, aged 69. He was under treatment for lung cancer at Johns Hopkins Hospital.
