= Enam Ahmed Chowdhury =

Bangladeshi civil servant

- এনাম আহমেদ চৌধুরী
- Born: 29 June 1937; Sylhet District, Assam Province, British India
- Died: 3 February 2025 (aged 87); Dhaka, Bangladesh
- Education: University of Dhaka; University of Oxford
- Parents: Ghyasuddin Ahmed Chowdhury (father); Rafiqunnesa Khatun Chowdhury (mother)
- Relatives: Faruq Choudhury (brother); Iftekhar Chowdhury (brother); Masum Chowdhury (brother)

Enam Ahmed Chowdhury (29 June 1937 – 3 February 2025) was a Bangladeshi civil servant who was secretary and chairman of the Privatization Commission. He was a member of Awami League and Bangladesh Nationalist Party.

== Early life ==
Chowdhury was born on 29 June 1937 at Barokot village of Golapganj in Sylhet District in the then Assam Province, British India. His father, Giasuddin Ahmed Chowdhury, served as a commissioner in Dhaka. His mother was Rafiqunnessa Khatun Chowdhury. He studied in Shillong, Assam. As a student he was a leader of the 1952 Bengali Language Movement. He earned his bachelors and masters degrees in economics at the University of Dhaka. He earned another masters at the University of Oxford.

== Career ==
Chowdhury joined the Pakistan Civil Service in 1960. He was the Joint Secretary of the Ministry of Commerce in 1972 and 1973. He was the Director General of the Export Promotion Bureau in 1974.

Chowdhury was one of the founders of Union Capital Limited, formed after purchasing the local operations of Peregrine Investments Holdings. He was the first chairman of Union Capital and had previously served as vice-president of the Islamic Development Bank. He joined the Bangladesh Nationalist Party in 1999.

Chowdhury served as the Chairman of the Privatization Commission. He was injured in a crash of Bangladesh Biman Airlines flight BG-601 in 2004 at Osmani International Airport. By 2005, he had privatized 26 state owned enterprises and planned to privatize 16 more. He held road shows in Dubai, Karachi, Kualalampur, and Mumbai in an attempt to sell the state-owned Rupali Bank. He supported the elections held by chief advisor Latifur Rahman which returned the Bangladesh Nationalist Party to power. He was the convenor of Foreign Affairs Committee of the Bangladesh Nationalist Party. On 18 July 2006, his supporters and supporters of Syed Makbul Hossain, member of parliament, clashed resulting in the death of one Bangladesh Jatiyatabadi Chhatra Dal activist.

In 2007, Chowdhury was a delegate of a conference on Champaran Satyagraha organized by the Indian National Congress. Other delegates from Bangladesh included Muhammad Yunus, Dipu Moni, and Reaz Rahman. During the Fakruddin Ahmed led caretaker government he had sided with Abdul Mannan Bhuiyan led reform faction of the Bangladesh Nationalist Party.

Chowdhury was elected president of Commonwealth Society of Bangladesh in 2010. He was elected to the advisory council of the chairperson of the Bangladesh Nationalist Party. He called for foreign treaties to be ratified in parliament at an event at the Jatiya Press Club organized by Shujan. He was the managing director of Dahmashi Tours and Travels, local partner of Air Asia. He spoke in favor of a caretaker government system for holding elections at an event of Sushasaner Jonno Nagorik along with other members of the civil society of Bangladesh such as Ajoy Roy, Asif Nazrul, A. S. M. Shahjahan, Badiul Alam Mazumder, Emaz Uddin Ahmed, Kazi Ebadul Haque, Moniruzzaman Mia, Muzaffer Ahmad, Subhash Singha Roy, and Syed Abul Maqsood.

Chowdhury met with Marcia Bernicat, the United States ambassador to Bangladesh, along with a delegation of Bangladesh Nationalist Party in May 2016 along with Abdul Moyeen Khan.

In 2018, Chowdhury joined the Awami League and presented flowers to Prime Minister Sheikh Hasina at the Ganabhaban. He resigned from the post of vice-chairman of the Bangladesh Nationalist Party and advisor to former Prime Minister Khaleda Zia. He had sought the nomination of Bangladesh Nationalist Party from Sylhet-1 for the 11th Jatiya Sangsad election but the party had chosen to nominate Khandaker Abdul Muktadir, advisor to Khaleda Zia. He was appointed advisor to the Awami League. Sheikh Hasina would later claim Chowdhury and Morshed Khan were denied the nomination by Bangladesh Nationalist Party for not providing kickbacks to Tarique Rahman.

In December 2020, Chowdhury was elected chairman of the board of trustees of Impact Foundation Bangladesh. In October 2023, he met a United States Pre-Election Assessment Team along with Muhammad Faruk Khan, Shammi Ahmed, and others.

== Personal life and death ==
Chowdhury's brothers were Faruq Ahmed Choudhury, Iftekhar Ahmed Chowdhury and Masum Ahmed Chowdhury. He had two sisters, Nasim Hai who was married to the late Syed Abdul Hai and Nina Ahmed who is married to Fakhruddin Ahmed. His cousins are Shamsher Mobin Chowdhury and Hasan Mashhud Chowdhury.

Chowdhury had a son, Nadeem Chowdhury, and a daughter.

Chowdhury died from a cardiac arrest on 3 February 2025, at the age of 87.

== Bibliography ==
- Chiranjeeb Zia
- Ziaur Rahman O Bangladeshi Jatiyatabad
- Aposhheen Netri Begum Khaleda Zia O Bangladesher Ogrojatra
