= Kazi Anarkoly =

Bangladeshi diplomat

Kazi Anarkoly is a Bangladeshi diplomat and the director general of the South American Wing at the Ministry of Foreign Affairs. She was deputy Chief of Mission of the Bangladesh Embassy in Indonesia.

== Career ==
Anarkoly joined the 20th batch of the Bangladesh Civil Service as a foreign service cadre in 2001.

In January 2014, Anarkoly was part of an investigation team that looked at allegations of sexual harassment allegations against Md. Tauhedul Islam, the Bangladesh Consul General in Milan, by a coworker. The investigation team, which included Additional Secretary of the Ministry of Foreign Affairs Jishnu Roy Chowdhury and Additional Secretary of the Prime Minister's Office Paban Chowdhury, found evidence in favor of the allegations.

Anarkoly had served in Hong Kong and Rome. She was the consul the deputy consul general of the Los Angeles Bangladesh Consulate. She was withdrawn from Los Angeles after her domestic staff went missing for six months in 2017. This happened after the deputy consul general in New York Shahedul Islam and United Nations Development Programme staff Hamidur Rashid were detained over abusing domestic staff. She had bought the 40 year old staff from Bangladesh after her appointment in 2015. She was then posted to Indonesia.

Anarkoly was the deputy chief of the Bangladesh embassy in Indonesia. The Indonesian police raided her residence on 5 July 2022 and found marijuana. The police also detained her boyfriend, a Nigerian national. She was released following the Bangladesh Embassy getting involved as she enjoyed diplomatic immunity under the Vienna Convention. She was recalled to Bangladesh after an inquiry by the Ministry of Foreign Affairs. She received a reprimand at the ministry. The issue was discussed at the meeting of the parliamentary standing committee on the ministry of foreign affairs. Shahriar Alam, State Minister of Foreign Affairs, described the whole thing as "embarrassing".

In August 2024, Anarkoly was appointed director general of the South American Wing at the Ministry of Foreign Affairs.
