= Jaliardwip =

Island in Bangladesh

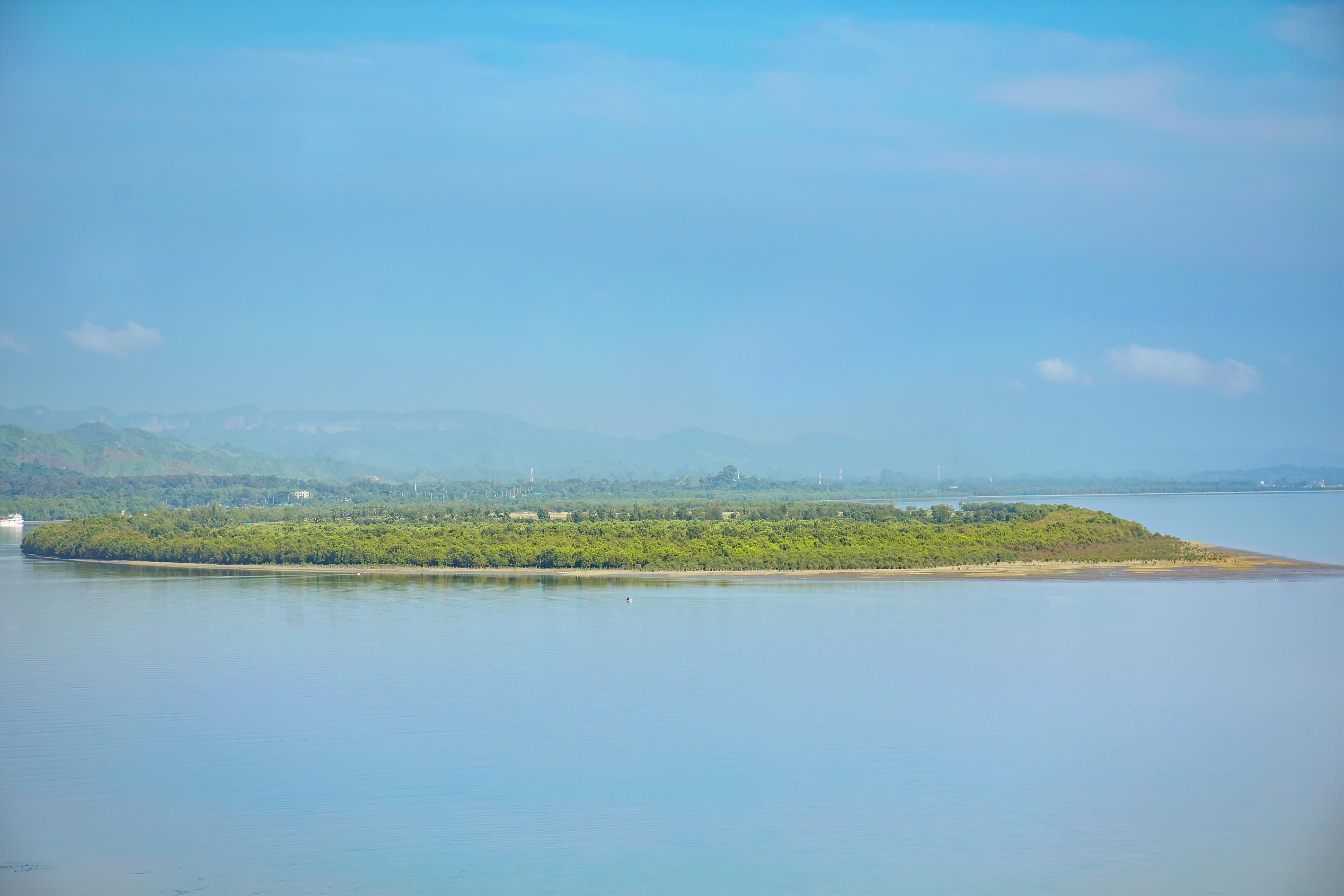
- Jaliardwip Island on the Naf River

- Location within Bangladesh

Geography
- Location: Naf River, Bay of Bengal
- Coordinates: 20°54′55″N 92°16′44″E
- Area: 1.1 km^{2} (0.42 sq mi)

Administration
- Bangladesh
- Division: Chittagong Division
- District: Cox's Bazar District
- Upazila: Teknaf Upazila

Demographics
- Population: Uninhabited
- Languages: Bengali

Jaliardwip (Bengali: জালিয়ার দ্বীপ) is an island in Teknaf upazila, Chittagong division in south-eastern Bangladesh covering an area of 271.93 acres (1.1 km^{2}). It is an island on the Naf River which demarcates the border between Bangladesh and Myanmar. 21.12 acres of land on the island belongs to the Forest Department.

== Geography ==
The location was designated as the site for Naf Tourism Park by the Bangladesh Economic Zones Authority. However, progress on the project has been suspended since 2023.

== History ==
The region has been subject to regular operations by the Border Guard Bangladesh aimed at apprehending individuals involved in drug trafficking, particularly ya ba and methamphetamine.
