= Saleh Shibly =

Bangladeshi journalist

- সালেহ শিবলী
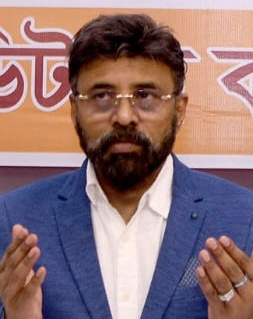
- Shibly in 2026

Press Secretary to the Prime Minister
- Incumbent
- Assumed office 18 February 2026
- Prime Minister: Tarique Rahman
- Preceded by: Shafiqul Alam

Personal details
- Born: Abu Abdullah M. Saleh Faridganj, Bangladesh
- Education: University of Dhaka
- Profession: Journalist

Abu Abdullah M. Saleh is a Bangladeshi journalist. He was appointed as Press Secretary to the 11th Prime Minister of Bangladesh Tarique Rahman. He was also made a member of the BNP's central election steering committee for the 13th parliamentary election.

== Birth & Education ==
Shibly was born in Faridganj Upazila of Chandpur District. He earned a master's degree from University of Dhaka. He also received a PhD in Media and Administration. He also worked as a non-resident fellow at Sydney Policy and Research Center, an Australia-based political research organization.

== Career ==
He worked as a reporter for United News of Bangladesh (UNB), Manab Zamin, Banglabazar Patrika and Channel i.

He served as general secretary of Dhaka Reporters Unity (DRU) in 2004. In 1994, he was general secretary of Dhaka University Journalists' Association (DUJA).

Shibly also served as press secretary to Tarique Rahman when Rahman was acting chairman of Bangladesh Nationalist Party (BNP). During BNP lead four-party alliance government, he worked as first secretary (press) at Deputy High Commission of Bangladesh in Kolkata.

== Appointment as Press Secretary ==
On 18 February 2026, Saleh Shibly was appointed as press secretary to Prime Minister Tarique Rahman. The appointment was confirmed through a gazette notification issued by Ministry of Public Administration. He received the rank of a secretary while serving in this position.

According to gazette notification, he was appointed on a contractual basis as Prime Minister's Press Secretary from date of joining. As a condition of the appointment, he was required to end all employment or professional relationships with any business and with any government, semi-government or private organization. His appointment remains valid until the end of the Prime Minister's term or until the Prime Minister decides otherwise, whichever comes first.

== Published book ==
Saleh Shibly is the author of book 'Tarique Rahmaner Nishiddha Bhashan' (The Forbidden Speeches of Tarique Rahman).
