= Ismat Jahan =

Bangladeshi diplomat

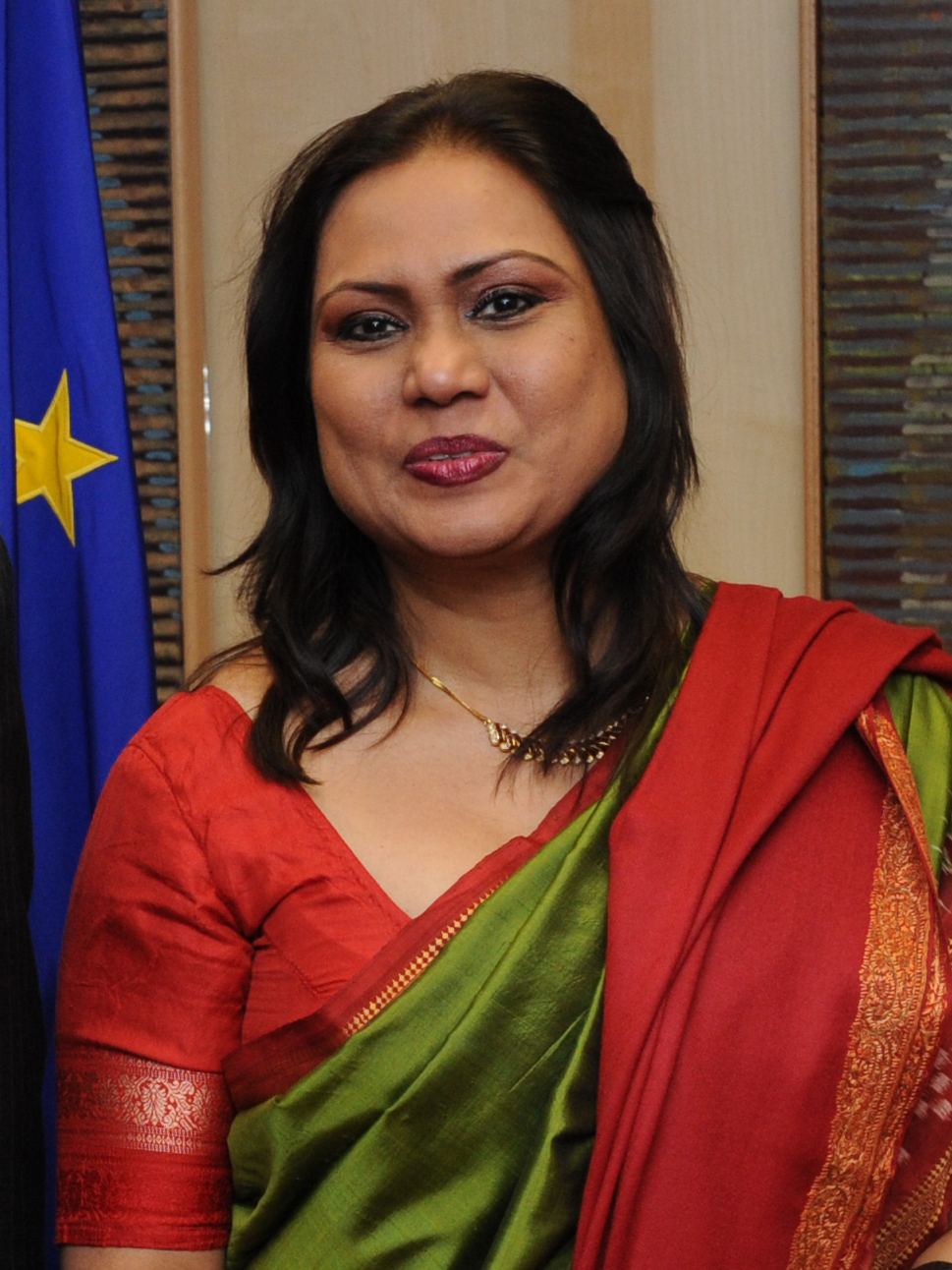
- Jahan at the European Union in Brussels in 2009

Head of the Permanent Observer Mission of the Organization of Islamic Cooperation to the European Union
- Incumbent
- Assumed office July 2016
- Preceded by: Agshin Mehdiyev

Bangladesh Ambassador to Belgium, Luxembourg and the European Union
- In office 25 August 2009 – 3 September 2016
- Preceded by: A. H. M. Moniruzzaman
- Succeeded by: Mohammed Shahdat Hossain

Permanent Representative of Bangladesh to the United Nations
- In office 2007–2009
- President: Iajuddin Ahmed
- Preceded by: Iftekhar Ahmed Chowdhury
- Succeeded by: Abulkalam Abdul Momen

Bangladesh Ambassador to the Netherlands
- In office 5 August 2005 – 13 June 2007
- Preceded by: Liaquat Ali Choudhury
- Succeeded by: Mizanur Rahman

Personal details
- Born: 1960 (age 65–66) Bangladesh
- Education: University of Dhaka; Tufts University

Ismat Jahan is a Bangladeshi diplomat who is currently serving as the permanent observer of the Organisation of Islamic Cooperation to the European Union. From 2009 to 2016, she was the ambassador of Bangladesh to Belgium, Luxembourg and the European Union and from 2007 to 2009, she was the ambassador and permanent representative of Bangladesh to the United Nations.

== Education ==
A career diplomat of the 1982 batch of Bangladesh Civil Service (foreign affairs) cadre, Jahan had her education in the University of Dhaka with an honours and a master's in economics.

Later, Jahan did her MA in law and diplomacy from the Fletcher School, Tufts University. She was also a fellow in the School of Foreign Service, Georgetown University in the United States.

== Career ==
During her diplomatic career, Jahan served in various capacities at Bangladesh's Foreign Affairs Ministry as well as missions abroad including Bangladesh's permanent missions in New York City and Geneva, and High Commission in New Delhi. She was Bangladesh's ambassador to the Netherlands (2005–2007).

Following her appointment as ambassador to the Netherlands, Jahan served as permanent representative of Bangladesh to the United Nations. She was the first woman permanent representative of Bangladesh to the UN.

From 2009 to 2016, Jahan served as the Bangladesh ambassador to Belgium, Luxembourg and head of mission to the European Union.

In 2010, Jahan was elected as member of the UN Committee on Elimination of Discrimination against Women (CEDAW).

In July 2016, she was appointed as the head the Organisation of Islamic Cooperation (OIC)'s Permanent Observer Mission to the European Union. In her role, Jahan contributes to raising awareness to anti-Muslim and antisemitic hate speech, including of hate speech on social media.

== Personal life ==
Jahan is married to Johannes den Heijer, a Dutch professor of Arabic language and literature at the Université Catholique de Louvain in Belgium. Under a rule dating back to 1976, Bangladesh foreign ministry officials were not allowed to marry foreign nationals. The law was amended in 2008, following a request by Jahan to marry den Heijer.
