= Sub-regional Co-operation Cell =

- Formation: 2012
- Headquarters: Dhaka, Bangladesh
- Region served: Bangladesh
- Official language: Bengali
- Website: pmo.gov.bd/site/page/4b34f982-c04c-42dc-b12d-7b57838aba44/Sub-regional-Co-operation-Cell-(SRCC)

Sub-regional Co-operation Cell (Bengali: উপ-আঞ্চলিক সহযোগিতা সেল) is a Bangladesh government agency under the Prime Minister's Office. It is responsible for managing relationship in the Bangladesh, Bhutan, India, Nepal sub regional initiative.

== History ==
Sub-regional Co-operation Cell was formed following the advice of Mashiur Rahman, Economic Affairs Advisor to the Prime Minister of Bangladesh Sheikh Hasina in 2009. The purpose of the cell is to work for greater cooperation in sub-region of South Asia containing Bangladesh, Bhutan, India, and Nepal. It started operations in 2012 replacing the Development and Coordination Cell. It works with the Bangladesh, Bhutan, India, Nepal initiative that works as a substitute for South Asian Association for Regional Cooperation (SAARC) which has been hindered by tensions between Pakistan and India. The opposition Bangladesh Nationalist Party was opposed to subregional cooperation preferring SAARC.
