= Naf Tourism Park =

Planned economic zone in Chittagong Division, Bangladesh

Coordinates: 20.915°N 92.279°E

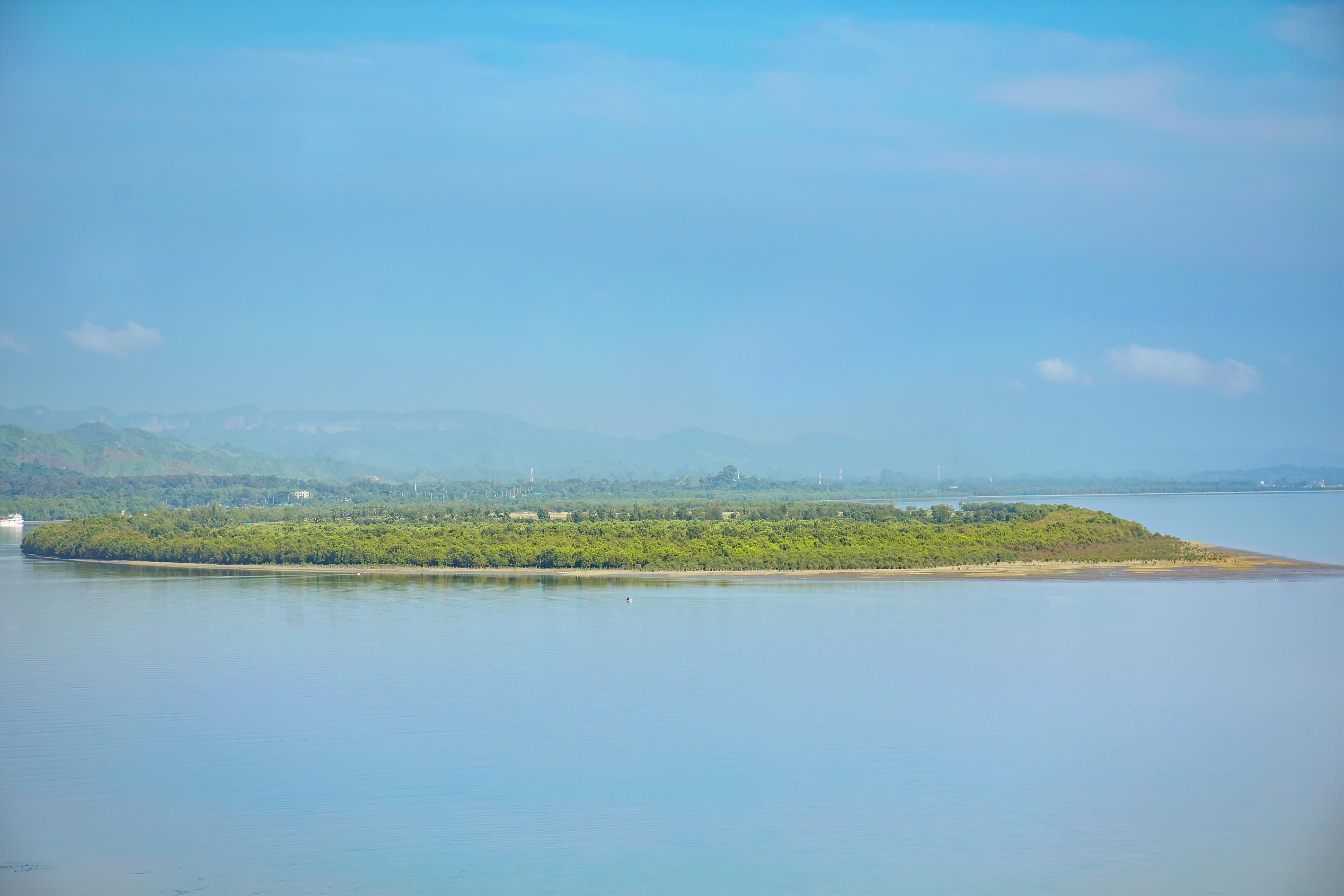
Jaliardwip island

Naf Tourism Park is a planned economic zone in Jaliardwip island, Cox's Bazar. Bangladesh Economic Zones Authority (BEZA) is developing this as part of its plan to build 100 special economic zones throughout the country. As of 2023, construction work on the project, approved in 2015, has been indefinitely halted due to objections raised by Myanmar regarding the dredging of sand from the nearby Naf River.

== Description ==
Naf Tourism Park will be located in the Jaliardwip island on an area of 290 acres (1.2 km^{2}), which is situated in the middle of the Naf River that divides Myanmar and Bangladesh. The project's location is characterized by its diversity and multifaceted features, offering scenic views of hills and the river.

== History ==
The Cabinet Committee on Economic Affairs approved the project on 6 May 2015. The Department of Environment (DoE) has provided environmental clearance for the development of the Tourism Park. A feasibility study was carried out by the UNICONSULT, a German based consultancy firm. Environmental impact assessment (EIA) and socio-economic impact assessment (SIA) was done by PricewaterhouseCoopers. The government has asked for bid for building various infrastructure for the tourists.

Prime Minister Sheikh Hasina laid the foundation stone of the project on 6 May 2017. On 12 September 2018, Siam Siam International of Thailand signed an agreement with Bangladesh Economic Zones Authority (BEZA) to invest around $500 million for the infrastructure development. The development of the park will be done in phases in the next five years. There are plans to build an 8.5-km long cable car connection to link the island with nearby Sabrang Tourism Park.

In 2022, construction work on the project has been indefinitely halted due to objections raised by Myanmar regarding the dredging of sand from the nearby Naf River. Consequently, BEZA has reached out to China, requesting investment and the appointment of a new contractor to facilitate the resumption of construction activities.

On 7 May 2024, BEZA issued an international tender inviting bids to develop the park on a build–operate–transfer basis under a public–private partnership.

== Issues ==
A group of environmentalists raised objections to the development of the project citing its status as a sanctuary of many animals.

== See also ==
- Sabrang Tourism Park
