= Alimul Haque =

Bangladeshi diplomat

Ambassador of Bangladesh to Germany
- In office 2003–2005
- Preceded by: Ashfaqur Rahman
- Succeeded by: Abdul B. Manjoor Rahim

High Commissioner of Bangladesh to Pakistan
- In office 4 March 2000 – 2 May 2003
- Preceded by: Masum Ahmed Chowdhury
- Succeeded by: F. A. Shamim Ahmed

Alimul Haque is a retired diplomat and former commissioner of Bangladesh to Pakistan. He was the deputy High commissioner of Bangladesh to India.

== Career ==
Haque was the second secretary of the Permanent Mission of Bangladesh to the United Nations in 1979. He was the first secretary of the Permanent Mission of Bangladesh to the United Nations in Geneva. He was a counsellor at the Bangladesh Embassy in Beijing.

In August 1999, while serving as the acting High Commissioner of Bangladesh to India, Haque was summoned by Indian officials following cross-border firing between the Border Security Force of India and the Bangladesh Rifles in Tripura. During the diplomatic exchange, Haque conveyed Dhaka's position that Indian forces provoked the clash. The incident occurred amid broader tensions between the two countries over border disputes and mutual allegations regarding insurgent activity.

Haque was appointed High Commissioner of Bangladesh to Pakistan in March 2000, replacing Masum A. Chowdhury.

In April 2003, Haque completed his tenure as the High Commissioner of Bangladesh to Pakistan. During a farewell meeting with Pakistani Prime Minister Mir Zafarullah Khan Jamali, both sides expressed satisfaction over the state of bilateral relations and discussed opportunities for expanding cooperation. F. A. Shamim Ahmed succeeded him as the High Commissioner of Bangladesh to Pakistan.

While serving as Bangladesh’s Ambassador to Germany in 2004, Haque was involved in official communications surrounding the death of prominent Bangladeshi writer and academic Humayun Azad. Following Azad’s death in Munich, Haque confirmed to The Daily Star that the Munich police had informed the High Commission the cause of death was determined to be natural, based on a post-mortem. He stated that the High Commission was coordinating with German authorities and the Bangladesh Foreign Ministry to facilitate the repatriation of Azad’s body.
