= A. H. M. Moniruzzaman =

Bangladeshi diplomat

- এ. এইচ. এম. মনিরুজ্জামান
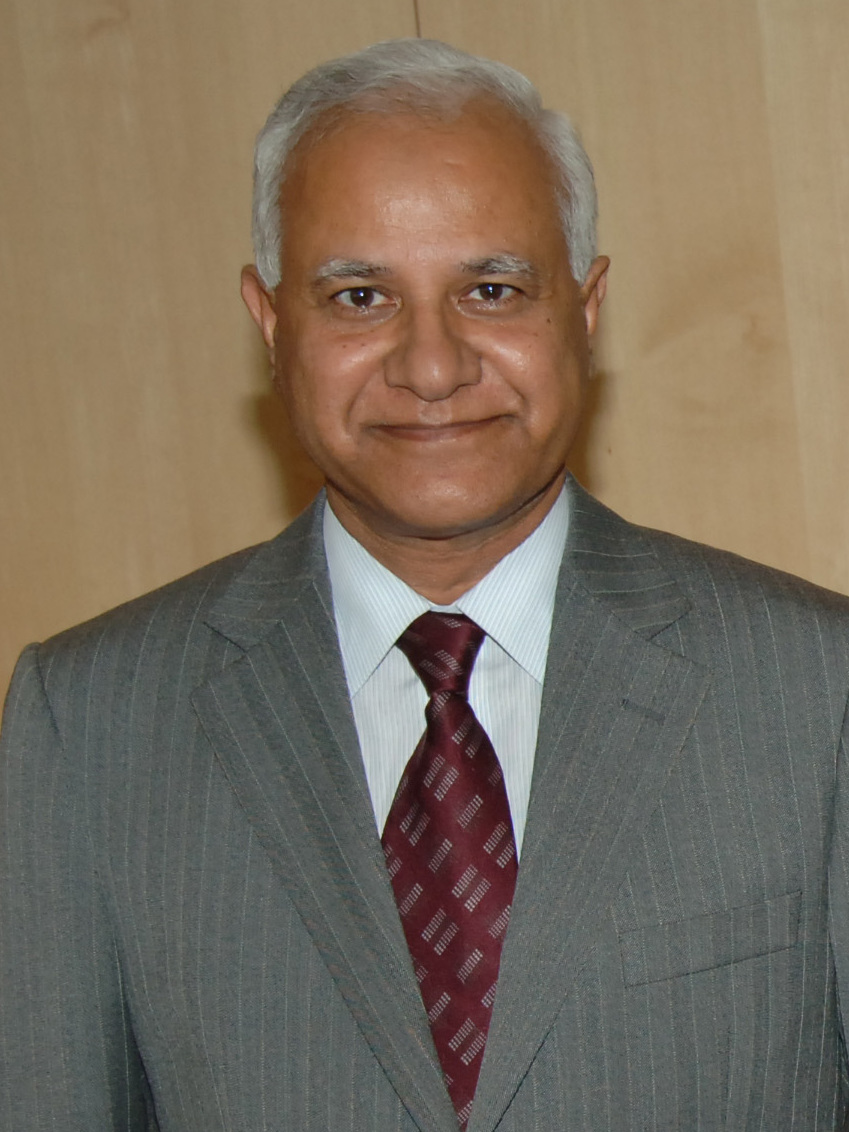
- Moniruzzaman at the European Union in Brussels (2006)

Bangladesh Ambassador to Belgium, Luxembourg and the European Union
- In office 1 September 2006 – 23 December 2008
- Preceded by: Syed Maudud Ali
- Succeeded by: Ismat Jahan

Personal details
- Education: University of Punjab; London School of Economics; University College London

A. H. M. Moniruzzaman is a career diplomat in the Bangladesh Foreign Service. He served as the head of Bangladesh's mission to the European Commission in Brussels and ambassador to Belgium and Luxembourg from September 2006 until December 2008. He was concurrently ambassador to Switzerland.

== Education and training ==
Then he obtained a B.A. with a First Class from the University of Punjab in 1972. He studied economics at the London School of Economics and Political Science and obtained B.Sc. in 1975. He secured M.Sc. in international relations from University College London in 1976. After joining Bangladesh Foreign Service, he attended the Graduate Institute of International Studies in the University of Geneva where he received a Certificate in Diplomatic Studies in 1989. In 1986 he attended a professional course on international law at The Hague Academy of International Law under the UN/UNITAR International Law Fellowship. He also participated in the UN/UNITAR course on international economics for diplomats at the Economic Development Institute of the World Bank, Washington, in 1987.

== Career ==
After returning to Bangladesh, Moniruzzaman joined the University of Dhaka in 1977 as an assistant professor in the Department of International Relations.

== Publications ==
- —— (January 1990). "Self- determination as a Collective Human Right : An Appraisal". BIISS Journal. 11 (1). Dhaka: Bangladesh Institute of International and Strategic Studies. ISSN 1010-9536.
