= Ferdousi Shahriar =

Bangladeshi diplomat (1951/1952–2026)

- ফেরদৌসি শাহরিয়ার
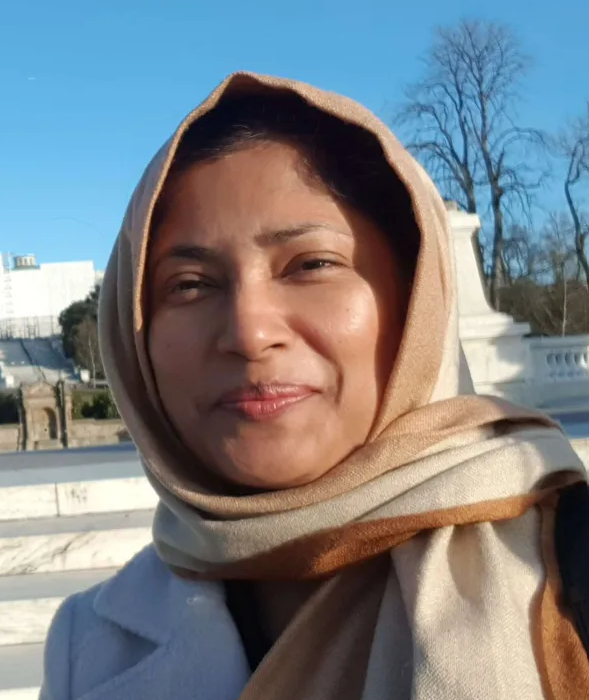
- Shahriar in 2023

High Commissioner of Bangladesh to Singapore
- In office November 2024 – 29 July 2026
- Preceded by: Md. Tauhedul Islam

Personal details
- Born: 1971 or 1972
- Died: 29 July 2026 (aged 54) Dhaka, Bangladesh
- Education: University of Dhaka; Monash University

Ferdousi Shahriar (1971 or 1972 – 29 July 2026) was a Bangladeshi diplomat and the director general of the Myanmar wing at the Ministry of Foreign Affairs. She was the onetime deputy chief of mission of the Bangladesh Embassy in the United States, serving under Ambassador Tariq A. Karim.

== Career ==
Shahriar was the director general of the American wing at the Ministry of Foreign Affairs.

In 2022, Netra News reported that Shahriar, Deputy Chief of Mission at Bangladesh's Washington embassy, was a key figure behind official letters defending the Awami League government's stance on enforced disappearances, the Digital Security Act, and the Bhasan Char relocation. Her communications, often directed at major U S. media outlets and human rights organizations, formed part of the Bangladeshi government's broader lobbying campaign branded as “political propaganda” under US law. She was the acting chief of the mission after Ambassador Mohammad Imran was transferred out. She moderated a seminar on the death anniversary of Bangabandhu Sheikh Mujibur Rahman hosted by the Bangladesh Embassy to the United States.

In November 2024, Shahriar was appointed High Commissioner of Bangladesh to Singapore. She served as the director general of the Myanmar wing at the Ministry of Foreign Affairs. She went on an official trip to Kunming, People's Republic of China, accompanying Khalilur Rahman, High Representative to the Chief Adviser, Muhammad Yunus in Bangladesh's interim government, from 28 February to 2 March 2025.

== Death ==
Shahriar died on 29 July 2026, at the age of 54, while undergoing treatment at the Bangladesh Specialised Hospital.
