= Liaquat Ali Chowdhury =

Bangladeshi diplomat

- লিয়াকত আলী চৌধুরী

High Commissioner of Bangladesh to India
- In office 28 May 2005 – 6 May 2009
- Preceded by: Hemayet Uddin
- Succeeded by: Tariq Ahmed Karim

Ambassador of Bangladesh to the Netherlands
- In office 7 August 2003 – 20 May 2005
- Preceded by: F. A. Shamim Ahmed
- Succeeded by: Ismat Jahan

Liaquat Ali Choudhury is a Bangladeshi diplomat and former High Commissioner to India.

== Career ==
Choudhury was the Ambassador of Bangladesh to the Netherlands from 7 August 2003 to 20 May 2005. He had succeeded F. A. Shamim Ahmed and was replaced by Ismat Jahan. He was then appointed the High Commissioner of Bangladesh to India. He held the rank of secretary. Tariq Ahmed Karim succeeded Chowdhury as High Commissioner of Bangladesh to India in 2009.

In June 2007, Choudhury was considered a candidate for the post of secretary of the Ministry of Foreign Affairs along with M. Humayun Kabir. The post had been empty since Hemayet Uddin left it for the Organisation of Islamic Cooperation and Minzur Rahim served as replacement for a short while.

Choudhury is an Advisory Board member of the Shailan Probeen Nibash.
