= Kazi M Aminul Islam =

Former secretary and civil servant

1st Executive Chairman of Bangladesh Investment Development Authority
- In office 4 September 2016 – 4 September 2019
- Prime Minister: Sheikh Hasina
- Preceded by: Office established
- Succeeded by: Md Sirazul Islam

Kazi M Aminul Islam is a retired civil servant and former secretary to the Chief Advisor Fakhruddin Ahmed, head of the caretaker government from 2007 to 2008. He was the first chairman of the Bangladesh Investment Development Authority. He had the rank of a minister as chairman of the Bangladesh Investment Development Authority.

Islam is the chairman of Meridian Finance & Investment Limited. He is the chairman of the Innovation and Development Associates (iDEA) Foundation.

== Early life ==
Islam completed one master's in economics at the University of Dhaka and another at Boston University.

== Career ==
Islam joined the Bangladesh Civil Service in 1981.

Islam was the chairman of the Bangladesh Sugar and Food Industries Corporation and was appointed member of the Bangladesh Planning Commission.

Islam was the secretary to the Chief Advisor Fakhruddin Ahmed, head of the caretaker government from 2007 to 2008. He chaired a reception to the Special Olympics Bangladesh in 2008. He briefly served as the secretary to Prime Minister Sheikh Hasina. In 2009, he was appointed an Alternate Executive Director of the World Bank.

Islam was the founding chairman of Meridian Finance and Investment Limited. Governor of Bangladesh Bank, Atiur Rahman, launched the company on 20 October 2015.

On 4 September 2016, Islam was appointed the founding chairman of Bangladesh Investment Development Authority. The Authority was created through the merger of the Privatisation Commission and the Board of Investment. He carried out reforms that reduced the cost of business and time to establish a business. He launched a One-stop service at the Bangladesh Investment Development Authority. He oversaw the training under the Entrepreneurship and Skill Development Project of 24 thousand entrepreneurs. He signed an agreement to aid the investment of Mitsubishi. He served as the chairman of the Bangladesh Investment Development Authority till 2019. Md. Sirazul Islam replaced him as the chairman of the Bangladesh Investment Development Authority.
