= Md. Ashraful Moqbul =

Bangladeshi civil servant

Md. Ashraful Moqbul is a retired Bangladeshi civil servant and former chairman of state-owned Sonali Bank, the largest bank of Bangladesh. He was the secretary of the Ministry of Textiles and Jute. He is the chairman of Fareast Finance and Investment Limited. He was the senior secretary of the Bangladesh Parliament Secretariat.

== Career ==
Moqbul joined the Bangladesh Civil Service in January 1981. Moqbul was the deputy commissioner in Khagrachari District, Pabna District, and Kushtia District.

Moqbul was the Joint Secretary in Ministry of Civil Aviation and Tourism. He was the Divisional Commissioner of Chittagong Division. He was an Additional Secretary of the Ministry of Education. He was the chairman of Land Appeal Board. In June 2008, he was promoted to secretary.

Moqbul was the secretary of the Ministry of Textiles and Jute in 2011. He inaugurated the International Jute Fair in Dhaka organized with the National Jute Board of India. He introduced policy which mandated the use of jute bags in packaging of rice and other grains. The policy was codified through the passage of an ordinance by the parliament of Bangladesh.

Moqbul competed with Molla Waheeduzzaman and Abdus Sobhan Sikder for the post of principal secretary to Prime Minister Sheikh Hasina. He was appointed the senior secretary of Bangladesh Parliament Secretariat from 25 September 2013 to 31 December 2015. In March 2014, he was promoted to senior secretary.

In August 2016, Moqbul was appointed chairman of Sonali Bank. He led Sonali Bank after the Hallmark-Sonali Bank Loan Scam, and adopted a conservative approach to loans. The scam had taken about 30 billion BDT loans from the Sonali Bank branch at the Ruposhi Bangla Hotel. He was also the chairman of Sonali Investment Limited.

In March 2021, the Bangladesh Securities and Exchange Commission dissolved the board of directors of the Fareast Finance and Investment Limited and appointed Moqbul as the new chairman of the board of directors.
