= Ashik Chowdhury =

Bangladeshi economist, banker and chartered financial analyst

Ashik Chowdhury CFA
- আশিক চৌধুরী
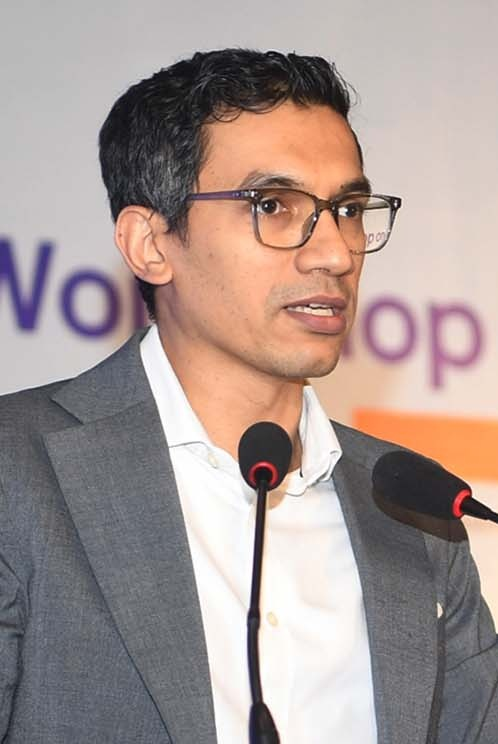
- Chowdhury in 2025

Executive Chairman of Invest Bangladesh
- Incumbent
- Assumed office 1 November 2024
- Prime Minister: Tarique Rahman: Muhammad Yunus (acting)
- Preceded by: Lokman Hossain Miah

Executive Chairman of Bangladesh Economic Zones Authority
- In office 12 September 2024 – 20 August 2026
- Prime Minister: Tarique Rahman: Muhammad Yunus (acting)
- Preceded by: Md Sarwar Bari
- Succeeded by: Office abolished

Chief Executive Officer of Public-Private Partnership Authority
- In office 20 August 2025 – 20 August 2026
- Prime Minister: Tarique Rahman: Muhammad Yunus (acting)
- Preceded by: Muhammad Ibrahim
- Succeeded by: Office abolished

Executive Chairman of Maheshkhali Integrated Development Authority
- In office 20 August 2025 – 20 August 2026
- Prime Minister: Tarique Rahman: Muhammad Yunus (acting)
- Succeeded by: Office abolished

Personal details
- Born: Chowdhury Ashik Mahmud Bin Harun Chandpur, Bangladesh
- Spouse: Nabila Jabeen Khan
- Children: 2
- Education: Institute of Business Administration, University of Dhaka; London Business School
- Profession: Chartered Financial Analyst

Chowdhury Ashik Mahmud Bin Harun, popularly known as Ashik Chowdhury, is a Bangladeshi economist, banker, and chartered financial analyst who has served as the executive chairman of Invest Bangladesh since 2024.

== Early life ==
Chowdhury was born in Chandpur and was raised in Jessore due to his fathers posting.

== Education ==
Chowdhury studied at Sylhet Cadet College and he is an ex-cadet of 21st batch of the institution. He did his Bachelor of Business Administration from Institute of Business Administration (IBA), University of Dhaka. He did his Master's in Finance from London Business School. He is a Chartered Financial Analyst.

== Career ==
Chowdhury started his career as a Territory Officer of the British American Tobacco in February 2007. He joined Standard Chartered Bank in August 2007 and worked there till March 2011 as a manager in the Lending Strategy and Financial Planning Division. He co-founded The Bench, the first sports bar in Bangladesh.

Chowdhury joined American Airlines in London in October 2012 as a financial and strategic analyst and left in May 2019 as the Head of Finance, Europe and Asia. He was a visiting professor at the Bangladesh University of Professionals. He was an advisor of Grameen Telecom Trust. He joined HSBC Bangladesh before moving onto HSBC Singapore. He was awarded the Professional Achievement Award by British Council Bangladesh. He was the Associate Director of Infrastructure Finance Investment Banking in October 2024 when he left the post.

Chowdhury was residing in Singapore when the July Uprising happened and the interim government was formed. He said that Chief Adviser Muhammad Yunus had called him, saying, "Ashik, got a chance to serve the country, wanna come?" Upon the call, Chowdhury returned to Bangladesh. In September 2024, he was appointed Executive Chairman of the Bangladesh Investment Development Authority replacing Lokman Hossain Miah. He was also appointed Executive Chairman of Bangladesh Economic Zones Authority replacing Md Sarwar Bari who was appointed in July 2024. On 7 April 2025, he was granted minister of state status.

== Achievements ==
Chowdhury is an avid skydiver. In Memphis, he jumped from 41,795 feet with a flag of Bangladesh. He was sponsored by United Commercial Bank PLC. He was awarded the Greatest Distance Freefall with a Banner or Flag record by Guinness World Records. Chowdhury also holds a private pilot license in Bangladesh.

== Personal life ==
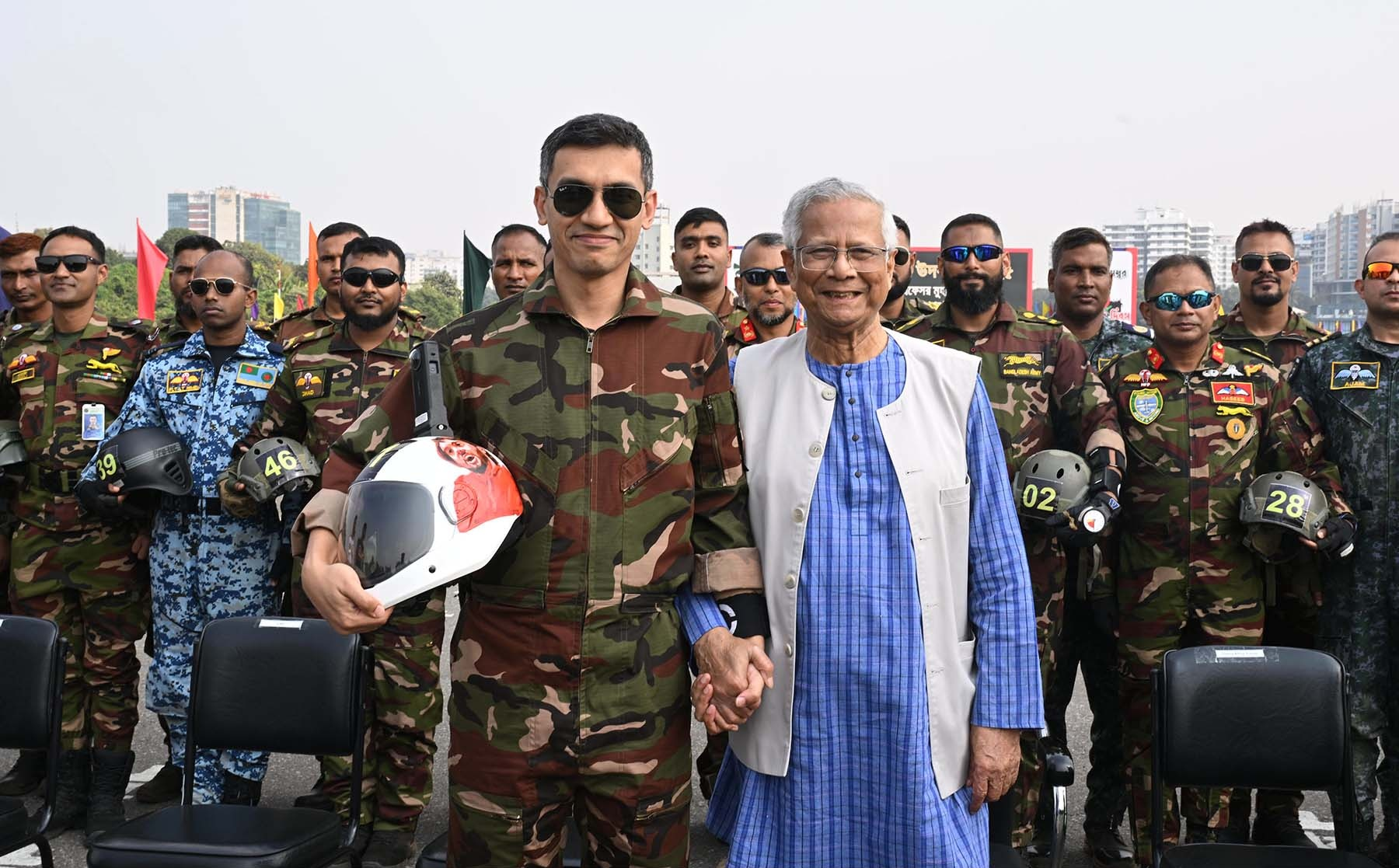
Ashik Chowdhury and Bangladesh Military paratroopers of “Team Bangladesh” with Chief Adviser Muhammad Yunus, following a world record attempt for the highest parachute display while holding a flag

Chowdhury is married to Nabila Jabeen Khan. The couple has two children, a son and a daughter.

== See also ==
- Yunus ministry
