= Syed Abdul Hai =

Syed Abdul Hai was a Bengali officer in Pakistan Army who was killed in the Bangladesh Liberation War by Pakistan Army. He is considered a martyr in Bangladesh.

== Early life ==
Hai was born in Miyabari, Sherpur District. He graduated from Sherpur Memorial High School and Jagannath College in 1940. He studied at Lytton Medical School and Medical College and Hospital, Kolkata.

== Career ==
Hai was commission in 1950 in the Army Medical Corps of the Pakistan Army.

From 1965 to 1969, Hai was deputed from Pakistan Army to the Ghana Army. He returned to Pakistan in 1969 and was appointed the commanding officer of the 7th Field Ambulance unit based in Jessore Cantonment as part of the 107 Brigade. He unit was involved in relief operations after the 12 November 1970 Bhola cyclone.

During the non-cooperation movement, Hai used the flag of pro-independence movement in his car which was reported to station commander, Brigadier Abdul Rahim Durrani. He had also made contact with Awami League politicians. After Operation Searchlight was launched starting the Bangladesh Liberation War, the Pakistan Army disarmed the 1st East Bengal and its Bengali commander, Lieutenant Colonel Jalil.

== Death ==
On 30 March 1971, Hai was killed by soldiers of the 27th Baloch Regiment and 22nd Frontier Force Regiment commanded by Captain Mumtaz. He was buried in Azimpur graveyard. Captain Abul Kalam Sheikh was also killed at the same time. The Bengali soldiers led by Captain Hafizuddin Ahmed fought back against the Baloch and Frontier regiments.

== Personal life ==
Hai was married to Naseem. They had three sons. His brother in law, Enam Ahmed Chaudhary, was the Chairman of the Bangladesh Privatisation Commission and advisor to former Prime Minister Khaleda Zia. His sister is law, Nina Ahmed, is married to former Chief Advisor Fakhruddin Ahmed. His other brother in law, Faruq Ahmed Choudhury, was the foreign secretary of Bangladesh and the other, Iftekhar Ahmed Choudhury, is a former advisor in charge of the ministry of Foreign Affairs.
