= Iftekhar Ahmed Chowdhury =

Bangladeshi diplomat

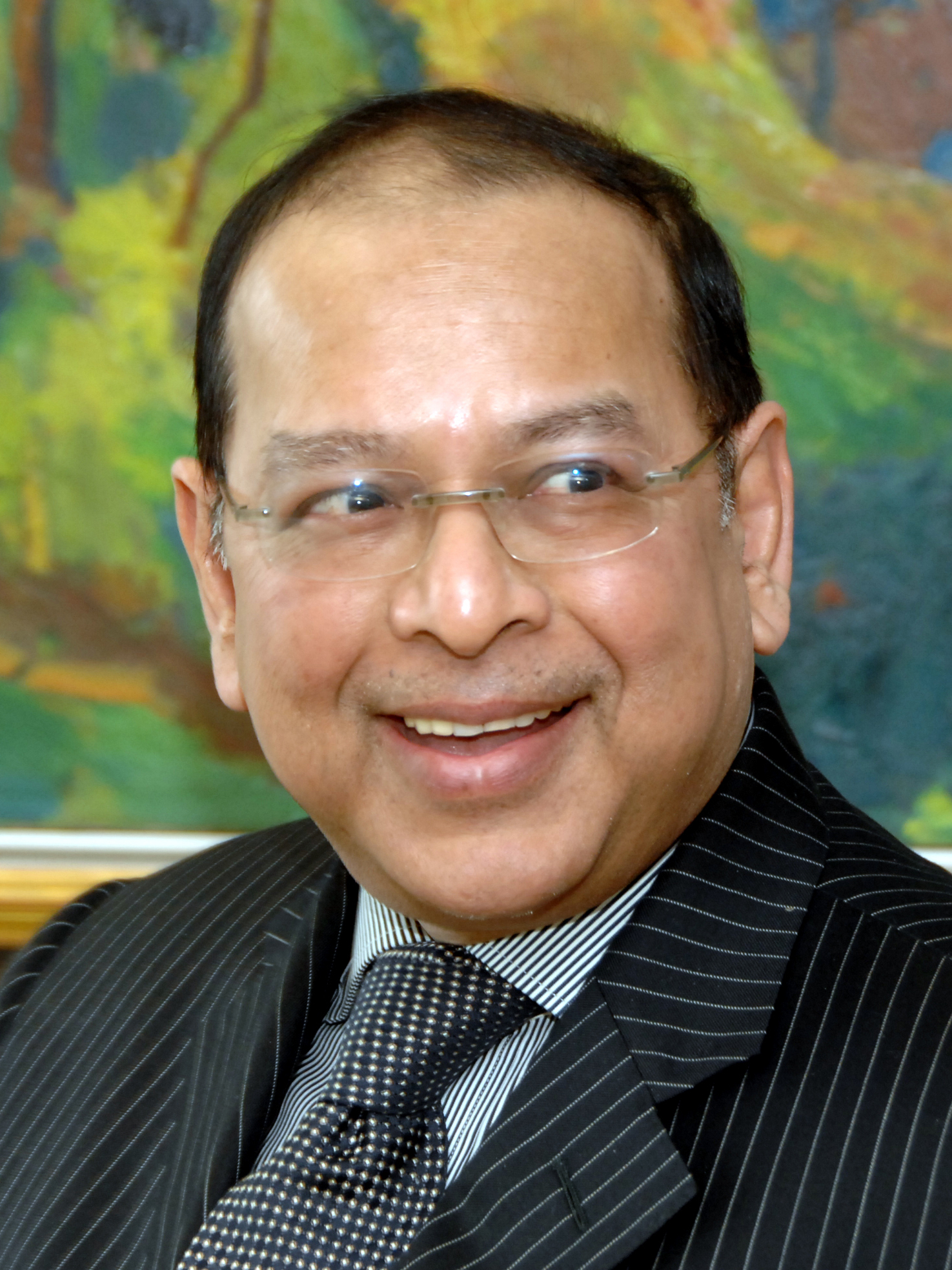
- Chowdhury at the European Union in Brussels (2008)

Adviser (Minister) of Foreign Affairs
- In office 2007–2008
- Preceded by: Iajuddin Ahmed
- Succeeded by: Dipu Moni

Permanent Representative of Bangladesh to the United Nations
- In office 2001–2007
- Preceded by: Anwarul Karim Chowdhury
- Succeeded by: Ismat Jahan

Ambassador of Bangladesh to Qatar
- In office 2 July 1994 – 14 December 1996
- Preceded by: Kazi Nazrul Islam
- Succeeded by: Abdul Aziz

Personal details
- Born: 25 October 1946 (age 80) Dacca District, British India
- Education: Australian National University; University of Dhaka

Iftekhar Ahmed Chowdhury is a former Bangladesh Advisor (Minister) of Foreign Affairs (2007–2009), a position he held after a long career in diplomacy and the Civil Service, starting in Pakistan in 1969, thereafter transferring to Bangladesh after the nation gained independence in 1971.

Chowdhury's contributions as a global diplomat were recognized by the New York City Council; he was named as "One of the World's Leading Diplomatic Leaders". He was also awarded a Knighthood of the Order of St. Gregory the Great by Pope John Paul the Second.

== Education ==
Chowdhury obtained an MA and Ph.D., both in International Relations at the Australian National University in Canberra, having stood First in First Class in Political Science Honours at the University of Dhaka.

== Career ==
In Bangladesh's pre-independence period, he had stood first in then-East Pakistan in the Superior Civil service examination, and joined the Civil Service of Pakistan (CSP) in 1969. He received his training in the Civil Service Academy in Lahore and began his administrative career as an assistant commissioner (probationer) in Abbottabad, in the North-West Frontiers of Pakistan (today's Khaybar Pakhtunkhwa).

Chowdhury's diplomatic career took him to Bonn, Doha, Geneva, and New York. During his longtime postings as Ambassador to the World Trade Organization (WTO) and to the United Nations (UN), he had been chairman of the WTO Council on Trade Policy Review, WTO Committee on Trade and Development, president of the Conference on Disarmament, chairman of the Committee for Social Development and chairman of the UN Information Committee, chairman of the Population and Development Commission, and chairman of the Committee on Social Development.

Upon secondment to the United Nations in 2000, Chowdhury was appointed Special Advisor to the Secretary General of the UN Conference on Trade and Development (UNCTAD) at its headquarters in Geneva. In that capacity he assisted Secretary General Rubens Ricupero in organizing the Third UN Conference on Least Developed Countries that took place in Brussels that year. He was appointed the chairman of the UN Second (Economic Committee) in 2003. He had been associated with the UN Reforms process as a "facilitator" appointed by the president of the UN General Assembly. He was also responsible for conducting negotiations on the paragraphs on principles of the responsibility to protect in the "Outcome Document" on UN Reforms approved by global leaders in 2005.

When, following a political crisis in Bangladesh, a caretaker government was formed in January 2007, Iftekhar Chowdhury was sworn in as the foreign minister in the Fakhruddin Ahmed cabinet. He was also put in charge of two additional ministries, Overseas Employment and Chittagong Hill Tracts Affairs.

In November 2008, there was a flare-up with Myanmar in the Bay of Bengal. A cabinet committee, helmed by Chowdhury, took a strong decision to send a naval patrol of four warships, forcing Myanmar to withdraw two of its vessels from disputed waters, ending a four-day stand off that almost brought the two neighbours into a serious armed conflict.

=== Career after government ===
Following the change of government in 2009, Chowdhury took to a career in the academia. He joined the Institute of South Asian Studies (ISAS) at the National University of Singapore (NUS) as the principal research fellow, where he remained till 2020, then becoming an Honorary Fellow. He also taught at the Rajaratnam School of International Studies (RSIS) at the Nanyang Technological University (NTU), and at the Lee Kuan Yew School of Public Policy in Singapore.

Chowdhury is on the advisory board of the New York-based Global Center on Cooperative Security. He has been attending the sessions of the Astana Club, a group of eminent global leaders annually hosted by President Nursultan Nazarbayev of Kazakhstan, and of the Beijing-based World Peace Forum.

In October 2020, he joined the private sector, when he assumed the post of senior group advisor of Meinhardt International, a multidisciplinary engineering and designing multinational firm headquartered in Singapore. He remained in that position for two years. He is a member of the Association of Former BCS (FA) Ambassadors.

== Personal life ==
Chowdhurys eldest brother Faruq Ahmed Choudhury was a foreign secretary, second brother Enam Ahmed Choudhury was secretary, and another brother is former ambassador Masum Ahmed Choudhury. A brother-in-law (freedom fighter Lieutenant colonel Syed Abdul Hai) was one of the highest -level Bangladeshi Army officers to have been killed during the Bangladesh Liberation War. His youngest sister, Nina Ahmed, married Fakhruddin Ahmed, former chief adviser to the 2007-08 caretaker government. His cousin is Geetiara Safia Chowdhury.
