= Governance Innovation Unit =

Government agency in Bangladesh

- Formation: 2012
- Headquarters: Dhaka, Bangladesh
- Region served: Bangladesh
- Official language: Bengali
- Website: Governance Innovation Unit

The Governance Innovation Unit is a government agency in Bangladesh responsible for the using innovations to improve transparency and public accountability of government services. The Chief of the Governance Innovation Unit is Dr Gowher Rizvi.

== History ==
The Governance Innovation Unit was formed by government of Bangladesh in 2012. It is under the supervision of Prime Minister's Office. The Unit proposed created a draft law that would provide entry level officers with subsidized apartments and low interest loans in October 2016. It is also responsible for planning the completion of the Sustainable Development Goals. The unit also funds scientific research in Bangladesh. It also carries out campaigns against child marriage in Bangladesh.
