= Shamim Ahmed (judge) =

Indian judge

Shamim Ahmed is an Indian judge who is serving as Judge of Allahabad High Court. He formerly served as Additional Judge of the same court.

== Personal life ==
He was born on March 8, 1966. He graduated in law and arts from University of Allahabad.
