= Ashfaqur Rahman =

Bangladeshi diplomat and columnist (1947–2018)

- আশফাকুর রহমান

Ambassador of Bangladesh to China
- In office 23 November 2003 – 4 May 2007
- Succeeded by: Munshi Faiz Ahmed

Ambassador of Bangladesh to Germany
- In office 2001–2003
- Succeeded by: Alimul Haque

High Commissioner of Bangladesh to Singapore
- In office 12 August 1996 – 15 April 2001
- Preceded by: M. A. Malik
- Succeeded by: Syed Maudud Ali

Personal details
- Born: 1947 Dhaka, Bengal Province, British India
- Died: 3 March 2018 (aged 70) Dhaka, Bangladesh
- Education: University of Dhaka
- Occupation: Diplomat, columnist

Ashfaqur Rahman (c. 1947 – 3 March 2018) was a Bangladeshi diplomat, columnist, and former civil servant. He served as a career diplomat for 36 years in various key roles, including as Bangladesh's Ambassador to China and Germany, and High Commissioner to Singapore.

== Early life and education ==
Rahman was born in Dhaka. He earned both his honours and master's degrees in economics from the University of Dhaka. He was awarded the Chancellor's gold medal in 1967 for his academic excellence.

== Career ==
Rahman began his career as a journalist, then became a teacher, and later joined the civil service after passing the Pakistan Civil Service Examination in 1970. After the Independence of Bangladesh in 1971, he joined the foreign service branch of the Bangladesh Civil Service.

Until 1978, Rahman worked in various ministries of the Government of Bangladesh and at the Prime Minister's Office. He then served in several Bangladeshi missions abroad, including in London, Tehran, Stockholm, and Moscow.

From 1996 to 2001, Rahman was the High Commissioner of Bangladesh to Singapore. He later served as Bangladesh's Ambassador to Germany until 2003. He was appointed the Ambassador of Bangladesh to China on 23 November 2003. Bangladesh recalled Rahman in 2004 for consultations to address tensions caused by Taiwan's approval to open a liaison office in Dhaka. The recall aims to clarify Bangladesh's stance and assess China's position while reaffirming its "one China" policy. Rahman served as the Ambassador of Bangladesh to China until 4 May 2007.

After retirement, Rahman became an active columnist, regularly contributing articles to various newspapers on national and international issues.

== Death ==
Rahman died of a heart attack on 3 March 2018 at Apollo Hospital in Dhaka, aged 70.
