= NGO Affairs Bureau =

Government body

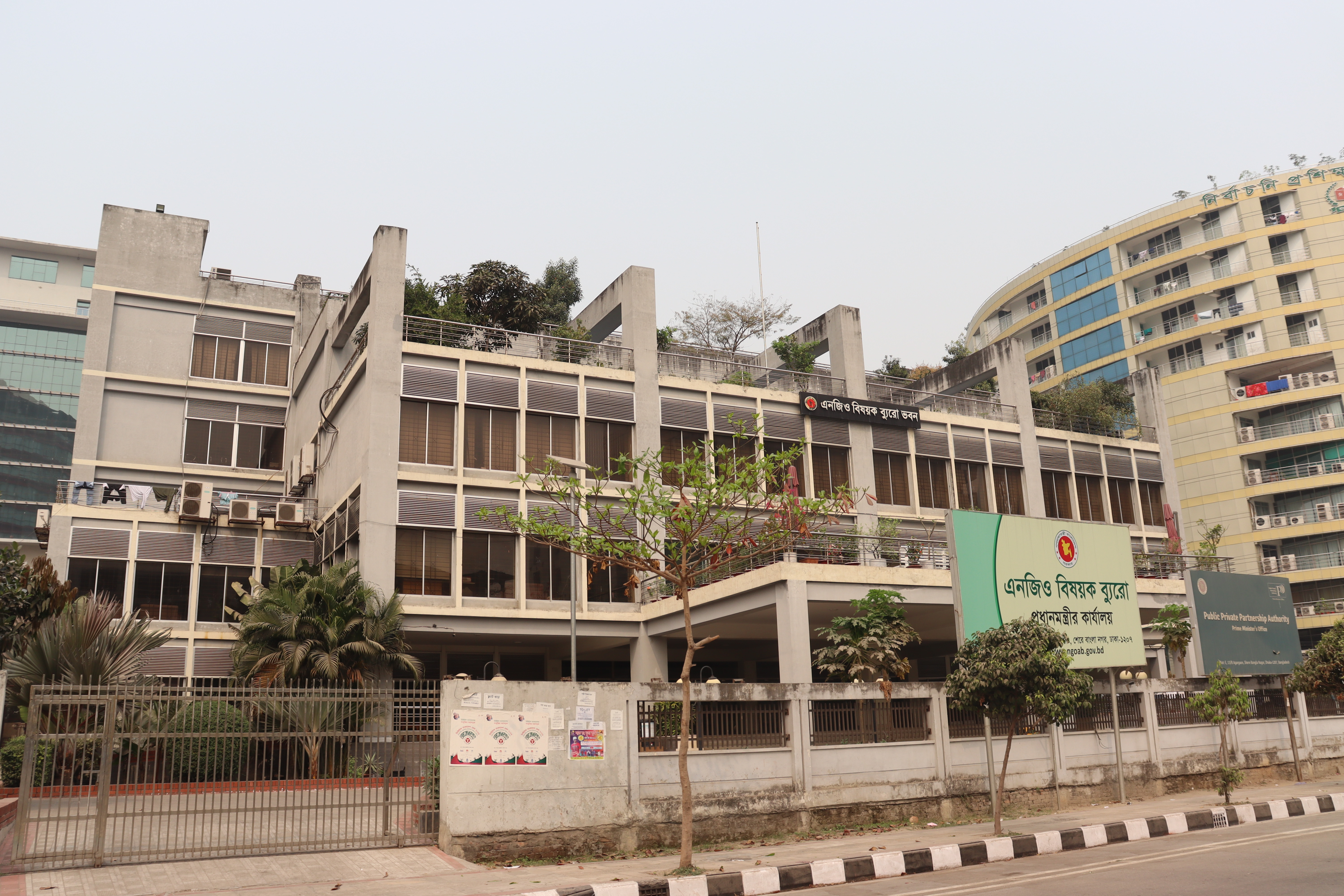
- Headquarters: Dhaka, Bangladesh
- Region served: Bangladesh
- Official language: Bengali
- Director General: Mohammed Jakaria
- Website: ngoab.gov.bd

NGO Affairs Bureau is a government bureau in Bangladesh that regulates non-governmental organizations.

== History ==
NGO Affairs Bureau was founded in 1990. All NGOs that receive fund from outside Bangladesh are required by law to register with the bureau which falls under the Chief Advisor's office. Mohammad Asadul Islam is the director general of the bureau. There are 2,498 NGOs registered with the bureau of which 240 are foreign and the rest are domestic.
