= National Special Economic Zone =

Economic zone in Chittagong Division, Bangladesh

Bashundhara Road, National Special Economic Zone.

National Special Economic Zone (Bengali: জাতীয় বিশেষ অর্থনৈতিক অঞ্চল), formerly the Bangabandhu Sheikh Mujib Shilpa Nagar, is a special economic zone located in Mirsharai Upazila, Chittagong District, Chittagong Division, Bangladesh, spanning 33,805 acres (136.80 km^{2}). Situated along the Dhaka–Chittagong highway, the economic zone is about 60 kilometres (37 mi) away from the port city of Chittagong. It is being developed under the oversight of the Bangladesh Economic Zones Authority (BEZA). By 2024, various companies have collectively invested US$1.23 billion, with five industrial units already operational.

== Geography ==
The industrial city is under development on approximately 33,805 acres (136.80 km^{2}) of land spanning three upazilas (sub-districts): Mirsarai and Sitakunda in Chittagong District, and Sonagazi in Feni District, formed from consolidating their respective economic zones. It is situated at the mouth of the Feni River, along 25 kilometres (16 mi) of coastline of Sandwip channel in the Bay of Bengal. 16,729 acres (6,770 ha) of land had already been acquired by the BEZA by June 2024.

== Development ==
The project is estimated to require a total investment of ৳4347 crore (US$350 million) for construction. The World Bank has provided a loan of ৳3967 crore (US$320 million), while the remaining ৳379 crore (US$31 million) is being funded by the government. The objective of the project is to transform the industrial city into a self-sustaining, globally competitive industrial hub, complete with seaports, railway and road networks, power facilities, waterfront promenades, and residential zones. Additionally, plans include the establishment of five-star hotels, tourist destinations, parks, healthcare facilities, educational institutions, and universities within the area.

As of February 2024, five industrial units are in commercial operations in the economic zone, with 22 more under construction. Approvals have been granted for 152 units within the zone, allocating over 5,251 acres (21.25 km^{2}) acres of land to companies that are collectively investing US$1.23 billion. These companies have proposed investments over US$18 billion, anticipating the creation of employment for 775,228 people. A $1.13 billion project is also planned to improve multimodal logistics by 2030. On 14 November 2024, the name of the economic zone was officially changed to the National Special Economic Zone. This was originally proposed after the ouster of Sheikh Hasina on 5 August that year. In the same month, the authority has presented a 20-year master plan for developing the economic zone in three phases.

== Industries ==
The project area encompasses several specialized zones, notably a 500-acre zone designated for the Bangladesh Garment Manufacturers and Exporters Association (BGMEA). Additionally, various other industries are planned to be established within the region, including agro-products and agro-processing machinery, integrated textiles, leather and leather products, shipbuilding, motorbike accessories, food and beverages, paints and chemicals, paper and related products, plastics, light engineering, and pharmaceutical industries.

== Issues ==
As of February 2024, investors in the economic zone face gas and water shortages, hindering industrial operations. A project to address water scarcity from the Meghna River is underway, expected by 2027. Entrepreneurs in the industrial city also struggle with recruitment, primarily due to housing and transportation issues, exacerbating the scarcity of labor.

== See also ==
- Bangladesh Economic Zones Authority
