= Sabrang Tourism Park =

Special economic zone in Chittagong division, Bangladesh

Coordinates: 20.8102°N 92.2934°E

Sabrang Tourism Park is a tourism special economic zone located in Cox's Bazar district of Chittagong division, Bangladesh. It is being developed by Bangladesh Economic Zones Authority (BEZA) on a land of 940 acres (3.8 km^{2}) in Sabrang union of Teknaf upazila. Situated approximately 96 kilometers away from Cox's Bazar Airport and accessible via the Cox's Bazar-Teknaf Marine Drive road, the park is planned to include special facilities for transportation to St. Martin's Island, a floating jetty, hotels and resorts, alongside amenities like a children's park, eco-cottages, an oceanarium, an underwater restaurant, and a floating restaurant, among others. The economic zone will reportedly allocate an area of approximately 100 acres exclusively for foreign tourists. Several companies are collectively proposing to invest approximately $413 million in the project, with expectations of generating around 15,000 jobs.

== See also ==
- Naf Tourism Park
