= Bangladesh Economic Zones Authority =

Agency of the Government of Bangladesh

- বাংলাদেশ অর্থনৈতিক অঞ্চল কর্তৃপক্ষ
- Logo of the BEZA

Agency overview
- Formed: 2010; 16 years ago
- Dissolved: 2026; 0 years ago
- Jurisdiction: Government of Bangladesh
- Headquarters: Level 7,8,9, Biniyog Bhaban, Plot#E-6/B, W, Agargaon, Dhaka 1207; 23.7681°N 90.3921°E
- Agency executive: Ashik Chowdhury, Executive Chairman
- Parent agency: Prime Minister's Office
- Website: beza.gov.bd

The Bangladesh Economic Zones Authority or BEZA (Bengali: বাংলাদেশ অর্থনৈতিক অঞ্চল কর্তৃপক্ষ) was an autonomous organization of the Government of Bangladesh tasked with developing Economic Zones all over the country. In 2026, it was merged with Bangladesh Investment Development Authority and Public-Private Partnership Authority to form the new Invest Bangladesh authority.

== History ==
The Bangladesh Economic Zones Act of 2010 created the Bangladesh Economic Zones Authority (BEZA) under the Prime Minister's Office. It was intended to accelerate economic growth by overseeing the development of 100 new economic zones by 2025. In contrast to the export processing zones operated by the Bangladesh Export Processing Zones Authority (BEPZA), which are publicly owned, the new zones were to be funded mainly by private capital and were to allow production for both export and domestic markets. Financial incentives such as exemptions from various taxes and customs and excise duties were intended to lure investors. Finance minister AMA Muhith projected in June 2015 that the economic zones would create 10 million jobs.

National Special Economic Zone is the largest economic zone, spread over 33,800 acres (13,700 ha) in Mirsharai, Sitakunda, and Sonagazi Upazilas. Trial production began there at several factories in the first half of 2022. By September 2023, five factories were in commercial production.

== Structure ==
BEZA's management structure consists of a governing board, executive board and a secretariat. The chairman of the governing board is the prime minister and members include the governor of Bangladesh Bank, the finance minister and other high-level ministers and elected policymakers. The governing board is responsible for overall policy decisions. The executive board includes bureaucrats from Government of Bangladesh.

Shaikh Yusuf Harun was appointed executive chairman of the authority in July 2021.

== Newly established and proposed economic zones ==
The authority has recently approved 37 new economic zones, which consists of governmental, non-governmental and specialized economic zones. The government also announced 50pc tax relief in hi-tech parks and economic zones.

- Agailjhara Economic Zone, Barisal (Under construction)
- Anowara (Gohira) Economic Zone, Chittagong (Under construction)
- Anowara Economic Zone-2, Chittagong (Under construction)
- Ashuganj Economic Zone, Brahmanbaria-2 (Approved)
- Brahmanbaria Economic Zone (Under Construction)
- Bagerhat Economic Zone (Under construction)
- Bhola Eco-Development Economic Zone (Under construction)
- Cox's Bazar Free Trade Zone (Maheskhali) (Under construction)
- Dohar Economic Zone, Dhaka (Under construction)
- Habiganj Economic Zone (Under construction)
- Jaliardip Economic Zone, Teknaf-Cox's Bazar (Under construction)
- Jamalpur Economic Zone (Approved)
- Kushtia Economic Zone (Under construction)
- Maheskhali Economic Zone-1 (Under construction)
- Maheskhali Economic Zone-2 (Under construction)
- Maheskhali Economic Zone-3 (Under construction)
- Manikganj Economic Zone (Under construction)
- National Special Economic Zone, Chittagong (Under construction)
- Narayangonj Economic Zone (Under construction)
- Narayangonj Economic Zone-2 (Under construction)
- Narshingdi Economic Zone (Under construction)
- Natore Economic Zone (Under construction)
- Nilphamari Economic Zone (Under construction)
- Panchagar Economic Zone (Under construction)
- Sabrang Special Economic Zone (Under construction)
- Shariatpur Economic Zone (Under construction)
- Shariatpur Economic Zone-2 (Under construction)
- Sirajganj Economic Zone (Under construction)
- Srihotto Economic Zone, Maulavibazar (Under construction)
- Sripur Economic Zone (Japanese Economic Zone), Gazipur (Under construction)

== Non-government economic zones ==
Government also encouraged building of private economic zone. Some are under construction and some are operational.

- A.K. Khan Economic Zone (operational)
- Abdul Monem Economic Zone (operational)
- Abul Khair Economic Zone
- Akij Economic Zone
- Aliance Economic Zone
- Aman Economic Zone
- Anowar Economic Zone
- Arisha Economic Zone
- Bashundhara Economic Zone
- Bay Economic Zone
- BGMEA Garments industrial park (operational)
- Chatak Economic Zone
- City Economic Zone
- City Special Economic Zone
- Cumilla Economic Zone (operational)
- East-Coast Group Economic Zone
- East-West Special Economic Zone
- Famkam Economic Zone (Proposed)
- Hamid Economic Zone
- Hoshendi Economic Zone
- Karnaphuli Dry Dock Special Economic Zone
- Kazi Farms Economic Zone Ltd.
- Kishoreganj Economic Zone (Under Construction)
- Meghna Economic Zone (Under Construction)
- Meghna Industrial Economic Zone (Under Construction)
- PowerPac Economic Zone (Mongla)
- Sirajganj Economic Zone
- Sonargaon Economic Zone (operational)
- Standard Global Economic Zone

== Government to government economic zones ==
- Chinese Economic and Industrial Zone (CEIZ)
- Indian Economic Zone (Kushtia)
- Indian Economic Zone (Mongla)
- Japanese Economic Zone (Araihazar EZ)

== Public private partnership (PPP) economic zones ==
- Mirsarai EZ (1st phase): The Powerpac-East West –Gasmin JV is the developer for this zone
- Mongla EZ: Mongla EZ is the first PPP EZ in Bangladesh. The developer of first PPP EZ are PowerPac-PPMKPPL JV

== Science and technology-based economic zones ==
The government is establishing science and technology-based economic zones to attract foreign direct investment. Some projects like Bangabandhu Hi-Tech City is being helped by World Bank and DFID.

- Barisal high tech park (land acquiring)
- Ramrail High tech park, Sadar-Brahmanbaria (Proposed)
- Chittagong high tech park (land acquiring)
- CUET IT business incubator centre, Chittagong (under construction)
- Dhaka high tech park (proposed)
- Janata tower Software Park (completed)
- Jashore Software Technology Park (operation)
- Kaliakoir high tech park (block development ongoing)
- Keranigonj Special IT Economic Zone, Dhaka (under construction)
- Khulna high tech park (proposed)
- Mohakhali IT Village (land acquiring)
- Rajhshahi high tech park (land acquiring)
- Rangpur high tech park (land acquiring)
- Sylhet Electronic City (under construction)
- Sylhet high tech park (Land acquiring)
- United City IT Park Ltd

== Tourism-based economic zones ==
- Naf Tourism Park
- Sabrang Tourism Park
- Sonadia Eco Tourism Park

== See also ==
- Special economic zone
