= Public-Private Partnership Authority =

Bangladeshi government agency

- সরকারি-বেসরকারি অংশীদারিত্ব কর্তৃপক্ষ
- Logo of the PPPA

Agency overview
- Formed: August 2010; 16 years ago
- Jurisdiction: Government of Bangladesh
- Headquarters: PPPA Building, Dhaka, Bangladesh
- Agency executive: Ashik Chowdhury, Chief Executive Officer
- Parent agency: Prime Minister's Office
- Website: www.pppo.gov.bd

Public-Private Partnership Authority is an autonomous government agency responsible for the management and support for Public-Private Partnership in Bangladesh and is located in Dhaka, Bangladesh. It is under the Prime Minister's Office, and serves as Bangladesh's PPP unit. Public-Private Partnership are worth US$3.5 billion every year in Bangladesh with the government planning to 12 billion dollar. In 2017 the government of Bangladesh declared a 10-year freeze on taxes for Public-Private Partnership.

== History ==
Public-Private Partnership Authority was established in August 2010. It was part of the Bangladesh Government's Vision 2021 was placed under the Prime Minister's Office.
