= Prime Minister's Office (Bangladesh) =

Government office in Bangladesh

Coordinates: 23.768369°N 90.391023°E

- প্রধানমন্ত্রীর কার্যালয়
- Emblem of the Prime Minister

Agency overview
- Formed: 27 August 1970; 56 years ago
- Jurisdiction: Government of Bangladesh
- Headquarters: Old Sangsad Bhaban, Tejgaon, Dhaka (since 1991) Ganabhaban, Sher-e-Bangla Nagar, Dhaka (1974-1975) Old Ganabhaban, Bailey Road, Dhaka (1972-1974)
- Annual budget: ৳2700.39 crore (US$220 million) (2026-2027)
- Prime Minister responsible: Tarique Rahman, Chairman
- Agency executives: A. B. M. Abdus Sattar, Principal Secretary; AKM Shamsul Islam, Defence Adviser; Mahdi Amin, Spokesperson; Abu Abdullah M. Saleh, Press Secretary
- Child agencies: Sub-regional Co-operation Cell; Governance Innovation Unit; Private Export Processing Zone; NGO Affairs Bureau; Bangladesh Export Processing Zone Authority; Invest Bangladesh Authority; National Skills Development Authority; Special Security Force; National Security Intelligence
- Website: www.pmo.gov.bd

The Prime Minister's Office (PMO) (Bengali: প্রধানমন্ত্রীর কার্যালয়, romanized: Prōdhanmōntrir Karjaloẏ) is the principal executive office of the Prime Minister of Bangladesh and serves as the central coordinating body of the Government of Bangladesh. It provides administrative, policy, and strategic support to the Prime Minister in the exercise of executive powers and decision-making.

It is responsible for coordinating the duties and executive actions of all governmental ministry offices on various matters primarily serving and assisting the Prime Minister's duties. During interim or caretaker governments, where the head of government is the Chief Adviser of Bangladesh, the office is instead known as the Chief Adviser's Office (Bengali: প্রধান উপদেষ্টার কার্যালয়, romanized: Prôdhān Upôdēṣṭār Kārjālôẏ) and may be headed by a Special Assistant to the Chief Adviser.

== Leadership ==
The key officials of the Prime Minister's Office are:

- Principal Secretary: A. B. M. Abdus Sattar
- Defence Adviser: AKM Shamsul Islam
- Press Secretary: Abu Abdullah M. Saleh

== Headquarters ==
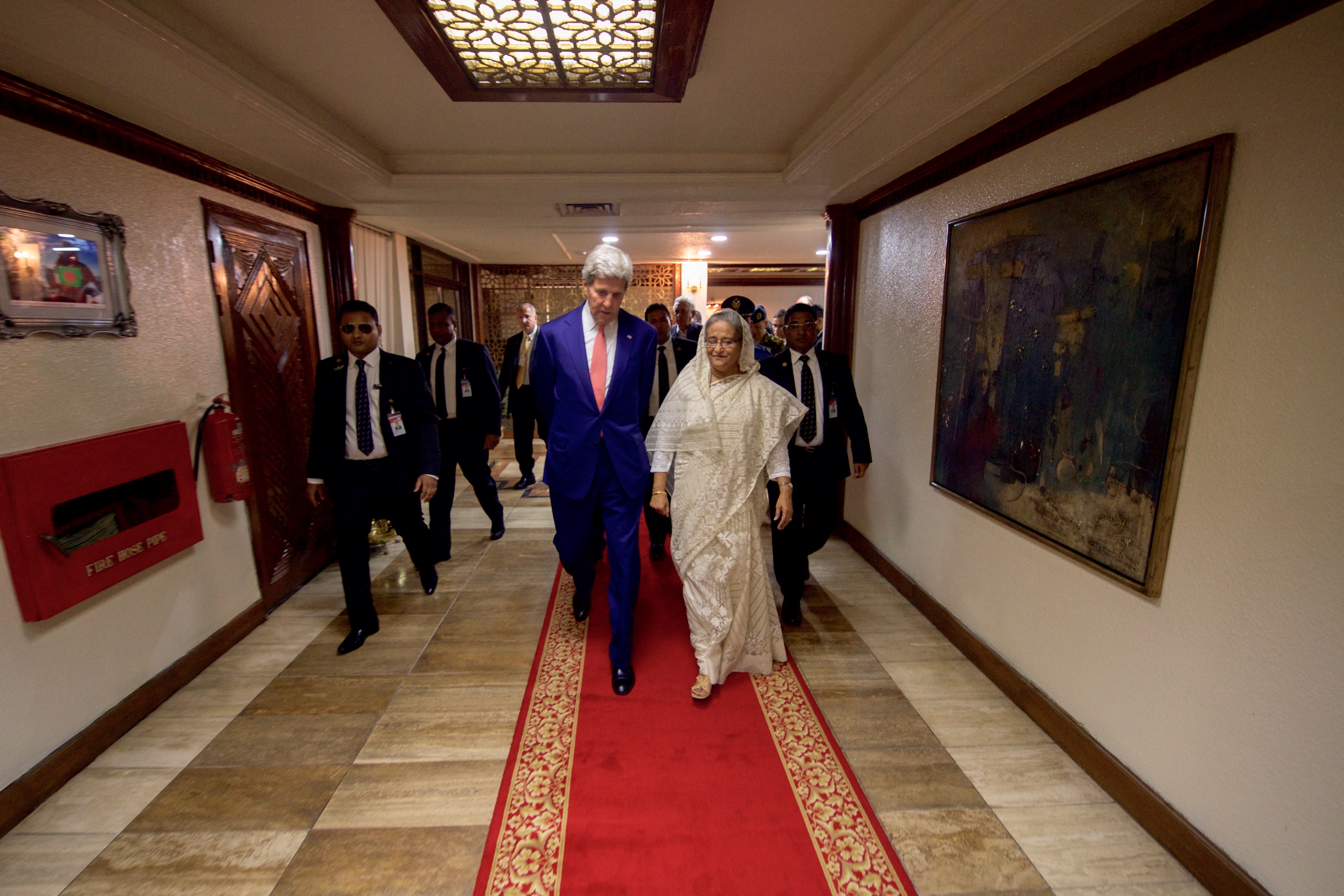
U.S. Secretary of State John Kerry walks through the Cross Hall with Bangladeshi Prime Minister Sheikh Hasina at the Prime Minister's Office in Dhaka in August 2016.

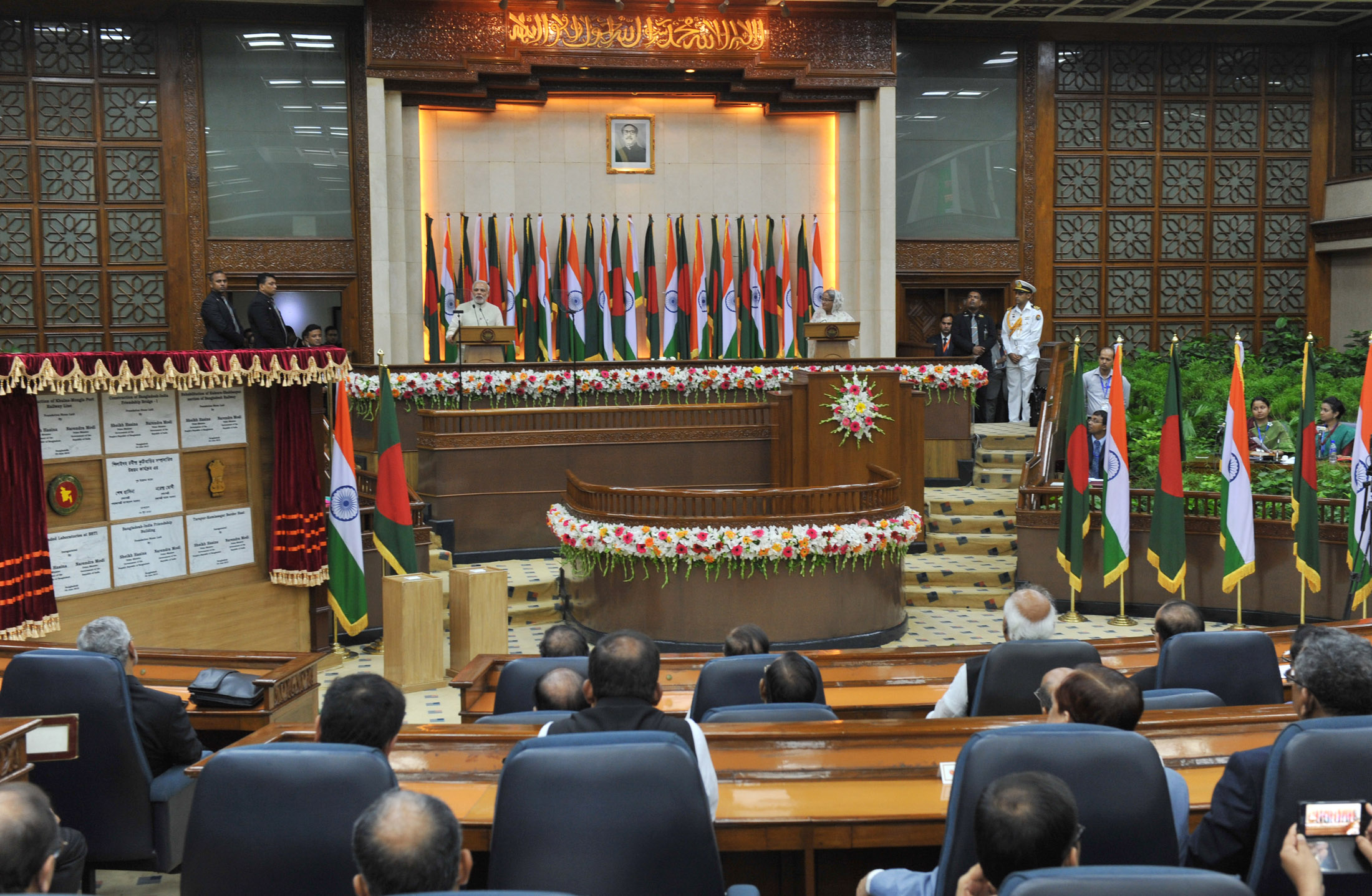
Indian Prime Minister Narendra Modi with Sheikh Hasina at PMO Conference hall formerly known as Debate chamber of Bangladesh Parliament in June 2015

During the premiership of Sheikh Mujibur Rahman before the revival of the presidential system of government in 1975, initially the Sugandha Bhaban (then known as the "President's House") on Bailey Road and later the Ganabhaban at Sher-e-Bangla Nagar served as the prime minister's secretariat.

Following the restoration of the parliamentary system in 1991, as the chief executive office, the PMO was given the Old Sangsad Bhaban (National Parliament Building), located within a complex with a tree lined park across Tejgaon Airport at Tejgaon, Dhaka, as its seat.

After the Jatiya Sangsad moved to the Jatiya Sangsad Bhaban in February 1982, the place temporarily functioned as the Presidential Secretariat.

== Services and activities ==
Chief Advisor's Office (CAO) is a division and equivalent to the ministry. Allocation of Business Among the different ministries and divisions has allocated some responsibilities. It provides:

- Secretarial assistance to the Prime Minister.
- Assistance to the Chief Advisor in the discharge of his/her responsibilities as and when necessary.
- Assistance to the Chief Advisor in the discharge of his/her Parliamentary responsibilities.
- Matters relating to Politics.
- Administration including financial matters of CAO.
- National Security Intelligence (NSI).
- Coordination of all Intelligence Agencies.
- NGO Affairs.
- Matters Relating to Board of Investment (BOI).
- Bangladesh Export Processing Zone Authority.
- Administration and supervision of subordinate offices and organizations under this office.
- Chief Advisor's Security including Special Security Force.
- Administration of Chief Advisor's Discretionary Fund.
- Messages and Addresses of the Chief Advisor.
- Reception of Foreign Heads of Government and dignitaries.
- Arrangement of Protocol and Ceremonials.
- Tours of the Prime Minister inside country (Foreign tours to be organized by the Ministry of Foreign Affairs).
- Liaison with International Agencies and matters relating to treaties and agreements with other countries and world bodies relating to subjects assigned to this office.
- All laws on subjects assigned to this office.
- Inquiries and statistics on any of the subjects assigned to this office.
- Fees in respect of any of the subjects assigned to this office except fees taken in courts.
- Such other functions as may be assigned to this office from time to time.

== Organization ==
=== Office Under PMO ===
- Cabinet Division
- Armed Forces Division
- National Economic Council (ECNEC)
- Bangladesh Economic Zones Authority (BEZA)
- Bangladesh Export Processing Zone Authority (BEPZA)
- Invest Bangladesh Authority (IBA)
- Public-Private Partnership Authority (PPPA)
- Governance Innovation Unit (GIU)
- National Security Intelligence (NSI)
- Special Security Force (SSF)
- NGO Affairs Bureau
- Sub-regional Co-operation Cell (SRCC)
- Private Export Processing Zone (PEPZ)

=== Project under PMO ===
- Project (Human Resource Development)
- Access to Information (A2I) Programme (ICT Services)
- Development Assistance for Special Area (except CHT)

== See also ==
- Cabinet of Bangladesh
- Bangabhaban – Official residence of the President of Bangladesh
