= Officers Club, Dhaka =

- Formation: 1967
- Headquarters: Dhaka, Bangladesh
- Location: 26, Baily Road, Dhaka
- Region served: Bangladesh
- Official language: Bengali
- Chairman (Cabinet Secretary): Nasimul Ghani
- Website: www.ocd.org.bd

The Officers Club, Dhaka is a recreation club for high government officials in Dhaka, Bangladesh. The Cabinet Secretary is the ex-officio Chairman of the club. It has been described as being an "exclusive" club.

== History ==
The club was founded in 1967. The club membership eligibility is restricted to government high officials (grade-5 and above). The club is managed by an elected executive committee. The committee is elected for a term of two years.
