= Md. Tauhedul Islam =

Md Tauhedul Islam
- মোঃ তৌহিদুল ইসলাম
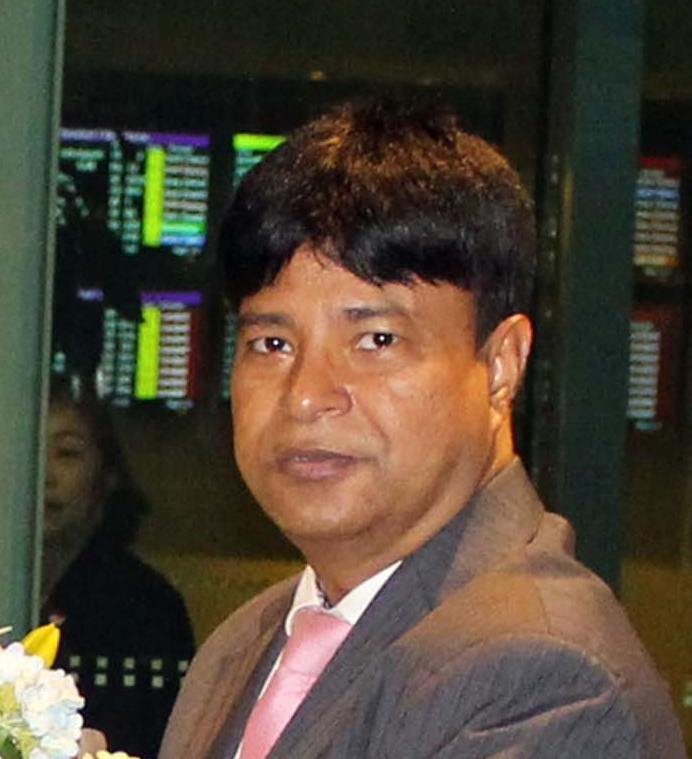
- Islam in 2023

Ambassador of Bangladesh to Brazil
- Incumbent
- Assumed office 5 June 2025
- Preceded by: Sadia Faizunnesa

High commissioner of Bangladesh to Singapore
- In office 16 September 2020 – 28 May 2025
- Preceded by: Mustafizur Rahman
- Succeeded by: Ferdousi Shahriar

Personal details
- Education: University of Dhaka; University of Oxford

Md Tauhedul Islam is a Bangladeshi diplomat and writer and the incumbent ambassador of Bangladesh to Brazil, Argentina,Uruguay,Paraguay, Chile, Bolivia and Venezuela. Earlier he was the High Commissioner of Bangladesh to Singapore and East Timor.

== Early life ==
Islam completed an MBBS. He later completed a masters in diplomacy at the University of Oxford. He completed another masters in defence studies at the National Defense College. He has a PhD in climate change at the University of Dhaka.

== Career ==
Islam joined the 17th batch of the Bangladesh Civil Service as a foreign service cadre in 1998. He came first in the recruitment exam, by topping the combined merit list of BCS Examination.

Islam has served in diplomatic outposts in Los Angeles and Jakarta. Permanent Mission of Bangladesh to the United Nations from 2009 to 2013. In January 2014, Islam was made Bangladesh Consul General in Milan, Italy.

Islam was promoted as a Director-General in the Ministry of Foreign Affairs from 2015 to 2016. He was then appointed Consul General of Bangladesh in Kunming. He helped organize the Bangladesh-China Youth Camp 2019 at the Yunnan University. He said that 4000 out of ten thousand Bangladesh students in China were studying in Yunnan University.

Islam was appointed High Commissioner of Bangladesh to Singapore on 29 September 2020. He organized a joint concert with India to celebrate 50 years of friendship between the two countries. Ignoring lobbying and coocked stories and criticism by the aspirant rivals in the Ministry, the Ministry of Foreign Affairs promoted Mr. Islam to the rank of Additional Foreign Secretary and planned to post him in a critically important country. The then Foreign Minister, Dr. Momen called Islam, "He is a very good officer. He is very bright and intelligent. He is a doer. He is a performer. ,".

Following the fall of the Sheikh Hasina led Awami League government it was alleged that, a few low-ranking officers tilted to the previous government plotted against him in 2014 in Milan to sabotage his career. Mr. Islam came and projected himself as a symbol of struggle, integrity and meritocracy. Most surprisingly, he didn't grab any reparation from the new government after the fall of the previous regime in a mass uprising in July–August 2024.
