= Invest Bangladesh =

Bangladesh apex investment promotion agency

- ইনভেস্ট বাংলাদেশ

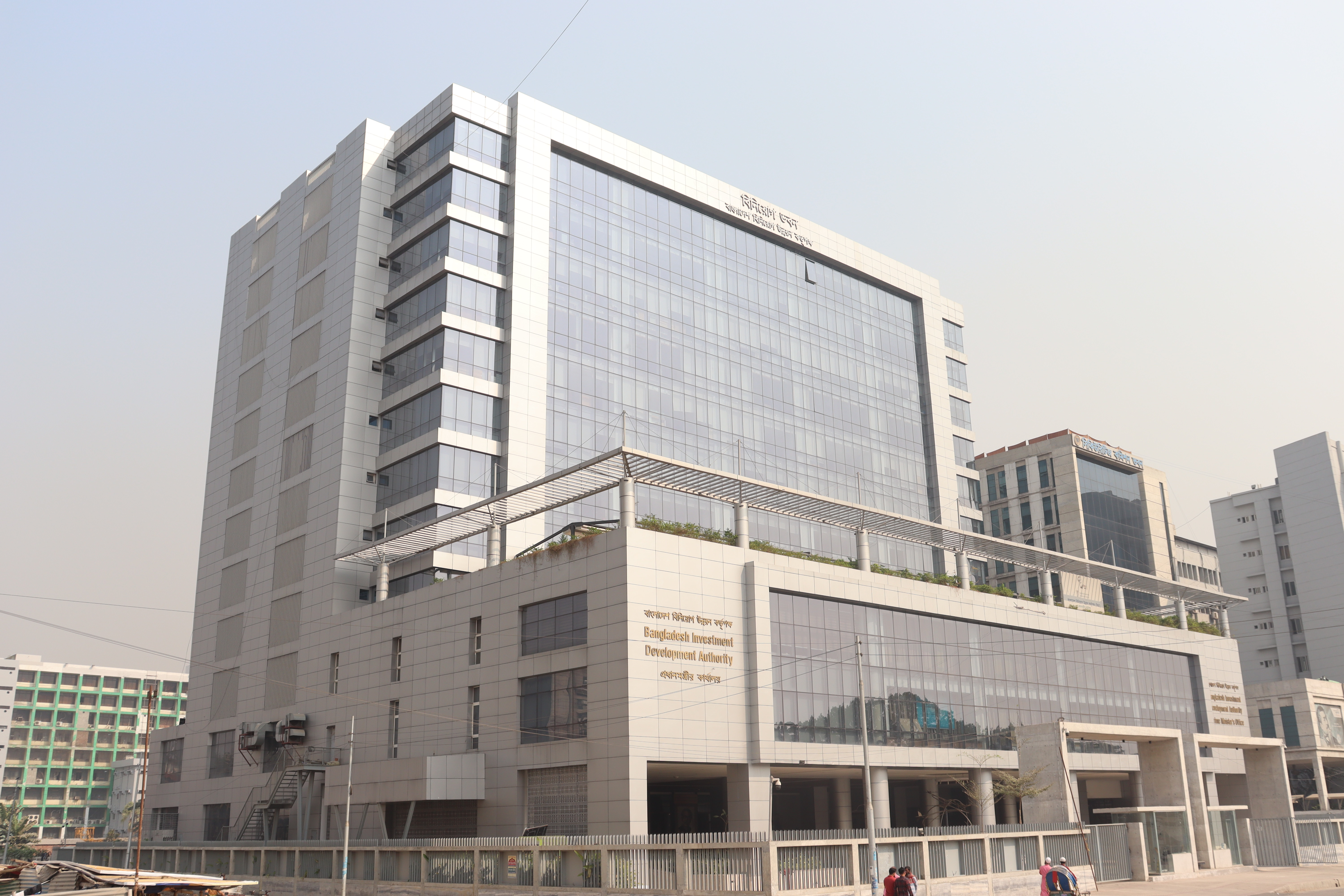
- Invest Bangladesh Building in Sher-e-Bangla Nagar, Dhaka

Agency overview
- Formed: August 22, 2026; 2 months ago
- Jurisdiction: Government of Bangladesh
- Headquarters: Biniyog Bhaban, E-6/B Agargaon, Sher-e-Bangla Nagar, Dhaka
- Agency executive: Ashik Chowdhury, Executive Chairman
- Parent agency: Prime Minister's Office
- Website: investbangladesh.gov.bd

The Invest Bangladesh (Bengali: ইনভেস্ট বাংলাদেশ) is the national investment promotion and facilitation agency of Bangladesh. It promotes and facilitates private investment and advocates business-friendly policies. It also provides regulatory services including registration, approvals and recommendations. It is under the Prime Minister's Office.

== History ==
Bangladesh Investment Development Authority (BIDA) was formed on 1 September 2016 through the Bangladesh Investment Development Authority Act that merged the erstwhile Board of Investment and Privatization Commission.

On August 22, 2026, the government enacted a new law to abolish BIDA, BEZA, and PPPA to merge them and form a new organization, Invest Bangladesh Authority (branded as Invest Bangladesh).
