= Abul Kalam Mohammad =

Abul Kalam Mohammad or Abul Kalam Muhammed (often abbreviated AKM) is a common compound male given name, especially in Bangladesh. People with the name include:

- AKM Abdur Rouf (1935–2000), founder-curator of the Bangladesh Film Archive
- Abu Taher (banker) (c. 1932–2004), Bangladeshi industrialist
- A. K. M. Adam (born 1957), American biblical scholar, theologian, author, priest, technologist and blogger
- Ahsanul Hoque Chowdhury (born 1968), Bangladeshi politician
- A. K. M. Alim Ullah (born 1955), Bangladeshi politician
- AKM Amanul Islam Chowdhury (died 2020), Bangladeshi caretaker government adviser
- A. K. M. Aminul Haque (1929–2022), Bangladeshi marine biologist and vice-chancellor of Bangladesh Agricultural University
- A. K. M. Aminul Haque (general) (born 1968), Bangladeshi major general
- AKM Asadul Haq (1928–1971), physician and army officer
- A. K. M. Asaduzzaman (born 1959), Bangladeshi judge
- A. K. M. Ashraf (born 1978), Indian Union Muslim League politician
- AKM Aszad, Bangladeshi politician
- AKM Azizul Haque (1923–2002), Bangladeshi social worker, development worker and government official
- A. K. M. Bahauddin (born 1954), Bangladeshi politician
- AKM Bazlul Karim (1932–1977), Bangladeshi theater personality
- AKM Bazlur Rahman (1930–1988), Bangladeshi politician
- AKM Enamul Haque Shamim (born 1965), Bangladeshi politician
- A. K. M. Fazle Hussain (born 1943), Bangladeshi professor
- A.K.M. Fazlul Kabir Chowdhury (1917–1972), Bangladeshi politician and businessman
- A.K.M. Fazlul Quader Chowdhury (1919–1973), Bengali politician
- AKM Gouach Uddin (c.1950–2019), Bangladeshi politician
- AKM Hafizuddin (died 1979), Bangladeshi politician, diplomat, government official and minister
- A. K. M. Hafizur Rahman, Bangladeshi politician
- AKM Jahangir Hossain (1954–2020), Bangladeshi Awami League politician
- A. K. M. Jahangir Khan (1939–2020), Bangladeshi film producer
- AKM Jalaluddin (1942/43–2014), Bangladeshi civil servant, diplomat, and academic
- AKM Khalequzzaman, Bangladesh Muslim League politician
- A. K. M. Kamruzzaman (1939/40–2025), Bangladeshi politician
- AKM Mahbubul Islam, Bangladeshi politician
- A. K. M. Mahmood (born 1975), Bangladeshi cricketer
- AKM Maidul Islam (1940–2018), Bangladeshi politician
- A. K. M. Majibur Rahman Bhuiyan, Bangladeshi ambassador to Iran and Japan
- A. K. M. Manirul Bahar, Bangladeshi officer
- A. K. M. Miraj Uddin (1948–1971), disappeared Bangladeshi athlete, politician and freedom fighter
- A. K. M. Mohiuddin Ahmed (1949–2010), Bangladeshi Army officer
- AKM Moinul Haque, Bangladeshi politician
- AKM Morshed, Bangladeshi politician
- A. K. M. Mosharraf Hossain (1936/37–2020), Bangladeshi politician
- A.K.M. Mostafizur Rahman (born 1961), Bangladeshi Jatiya Sangsad politician
- AKM Motiar Rahman (born 1928), Bangladeshi politician
- AKM Motorsport
- AKM Mozammel Haque (born 1946), Bangladeshi politician and Minister of Liberation War Affairs
- AKM Musa (died 2003), Bangladeshi bureaucrat
- A. K. M. Mustafa Kamal Pasha (born 1963), Bangladeshi major general
- Sardar AKM Nasiruddin, Bangladeshi politician
- AKM Nazir Ahmed (c. 1939–2014), Islamist politician
- A. K. M. Nazmul Hasan (born 1969), Bangladeshi major general
- AKM Nowsheruzzaman (1950–2020), Bangladeshi footballer
- A. K. M. Nurul Islam (1919–2015), Bangladeshi judge and vice president
- AKM Nurul Islam (botanist) (1928–2006), Bangladeshi botanist and academician
- AKM Nurul Karim Khair, Bangladeshi politician
- AKM Rafiq Ullah Choudhury (1923–2011), Gano Front politician
- A.K.M. Rahmatullah (born 1950), Bangladeshi Awami League politician
- A. K. M. Rezaul Karim Tansen (1953), Bangladeshi politician and Jatiya Sangsad member
- A. K. M. Sadeq (1928–2016), Bangladeshi judge
- AKM Salim Reza Habib, Bangladeshi politician
- AKM Samsul Haque Khan (died 1971), Bengali-Pakistani civil servant
- AKM Samsuzzoha (1924–1987), Bangladeshi politician
- AKM Sarwar Jahan Badsha, Bangladeshi politician
- Murder of A. K. M. Shafiul Islam, University of Rajshahi professor
- A. K. M. Shahidul Haque, Bangladeshi police officer
- AKM Shahidul Haque (journalist), Bangladeshi journalist
- A.K.M. Shahidul Islam, Bangladeshi politician
- A. K. M. Shahidul Karim ambassador to Denmark
- AKM Shahidullah (1930–1971), Bangladeshi writer and journalist
- AKM Shahidur Rahman, Bangladeshi police officer
- A. K. M. Shahjahan Kamal (1950–2023), Bangladeshi politician
- AKM Shamim Chowdhury, Bangladeshi journalist
- AKM Shamim Osman (born 1961), Bangladeshi politician
- AKM Shamsuddin, Bangladeshi politician
- A. K. M. Shamsul Haque (1940–1999), Bangladeshi politician
- AKM Shamsul Huda, Bangladeshi politician
- A K M Siddiq (died 2018), Bangladeshi academic and vice-chancellor
- AKM Software
- AKM Tula, Russian ice hockey club
- AKM Yusuf (1926–2014), Bangladeshi politician
- A. K. M. Zahirul Hoque (born 1959), Bangladeshi judge
- A. K. M. Zahirul Huq (born 1971), Bangladeshi judge
- Abul Kalam Mohammed Zakaria (c.1918–2016), Bangladeshi scholar and archaeologist
- AKM Ziauddin, Bangladeshi politician
- Abul Kalam Mohammad Ziaur Rahman, Bangladeshi military officer

== See also ==
- AKM Fazlul Haque, people with the name
- Abul Kalam, Bengali given name
- AKM (disambiguation)
