= Salahuddin Noman Chowdhury =

Bangladeshi diplomat (born 1969)

- সালাহউদ্দিন নোমান চৌধুরী
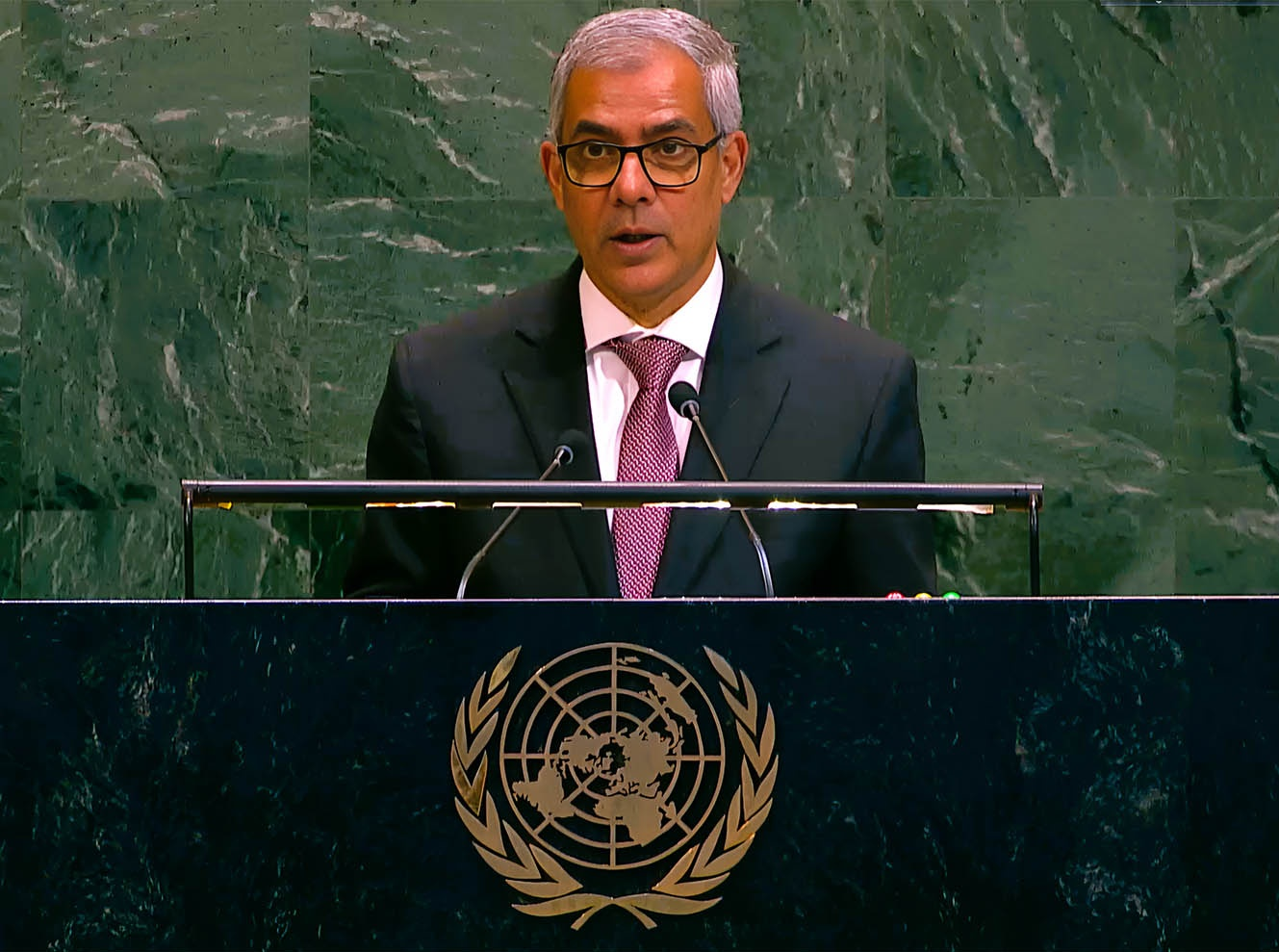
- Chowdhury in July 2026

Permanent Representative of Bangladesh to the United Nations
- In office 13 January 2025 – 29 August 2026
- Preceded by: Muhammad Abdul Muhith
- Succeeded by: Irene Khan

Ambassador of Bangladesh to Nepal
- In office 12 November 2020 – December 2024
- Preceded by: Mashfee Binte Shams
- Succeeded by: Shafiqur Rahman

Deputy High Commissioner of Bangladesh to India
- In office 2014 – 3 May 2017
- Succeeded by: ATM Rokebul Haque

Personal details
- Born: 29 August 1969 (age 57) Dhaka, East Pakistan, Pakistan. (present day Dhaka, Bangladesh)
- Citizenship: Bangladesh

Salahuddin Noman Chowdhury is a Bangladeshi diplomat currently serving as the Permanent Representative of Bangladesh to the United Nations. He previously held the position of Ambassador of Bangladesh to Nepal from 2020 until December 2024. He also served as Deputy High Commissioner of Bangladesh to India from 2014 to 2017 and as Deputy Ambassador of Bangladesh to China in Beijing from 2017 to 2020.

== Early life ==
Chowdhury was born on 29 August 1969 in Dhaka, East Pakistan, Pakistan. (present day Dhaka, Bangladesh) He did his undergraduate degree in civil engineering from the Bangladesh University of Engineering and Technology in 1993.

== Career ==
Chowdhury worked in the private sector after his graduation before joining the foreign service branch of the Bangladesh Civil Service in 1998. He worked at the Admin and United Nations Department at the Ministry of Foreign Affairs. From 2002 to 2005, he was second and first secretary at the High Commission of Bangladesh in Pakistan.

From 2005 to 2007, Chowdhury was stationed at the Bangladeshi consulate in New York City. He then worked at the Permanent Mission of Bangladesh to the United Nations. From 2008 to 2010, he was the deputy chief of protocol of visit at the Ministry of Foreign Affairs. He would also go on to serve as the director of economic affairs and South East Asia.

Chowdhury served as the vice principal of the Bangladesh Foreign Service Academy and director general of external affairs at the Ministry of Foreign Affairs. From 2014 to 2017, he was the Bangladesh high commissioner in India. In April 2015, he sought information from the Indian government on the rape and murder of a Bangladeshi national in New Delhi. In May 2017, he was transferred from India to China as Deputy Ambassador.

Chowdhury was the director general of administration at the Ministry of Foreign Affairs from 2017 to 2020. On 11 November 2020, he was appointed the ambassador of Bangladesh to Nepal. During his tenure an agreement on trading power was signed between Bangladesh and Nepal. He oversaw the participation of Bangladesh in the Nepal trade fair. He signed an agreement for Bangladesh to build a Buddhist temple in Nepal. He oversaw the repatriation of a Bangladeshi woman, Ameena Khatun, from Sunsari District of Nepal. Khatun has been missing from 22 years. She was identified and repatriated with the help of Bengali speakers in Sunsari District and officials of National Security Intelligence personnel in Bogra District.
