= Syed Masud Mahmood Khundoker =

Bangladeshi diplomat

- সৈয়দ মাসুদ মাহমুদ খুন্দকার

Ambassador of Bangladesh to Qatar
- In office 18 May 2013 – 24 August 2015
- Preceded by: Md Shahdat Hossain
- Succeeded by: Ashud Ahmed

Personal details
- Education: University of Chittagong

Syed Masud Mahmood Khundoker is a Bangladeshi diplomat and former ambassador of Bangladesh to Qatar. He was the Principal and later the rector of the Foreign Service Academy.

== Education ==
Khundoker earned his bachelor's and master's in English literature and language at the University of Chittagong.

== Career ==
Khundoker joined the 10th batch of the Bangladesh Civil Service as a foreign affairs cadre. In 2006, he was the counsellor at the Embassy of Bangladesh in Canada.

Khundoker was the Director General (SAARC and BIMSTEC wing) at the Ministry of Foreign Affairs. Before that, he served as the Director General of External Publicity at the Ministry of Foreign Affairs.

Khundoker was appointed ambassador of Bangladesh to Qatar, replacing Md. Shahdat Hossain on 18 May 2013. He attended the launch of the Qatar-based Middle East edition of the Prothom Alo. He secured 50 thousand new work permits for Bangladeshi workers.

In April 2015, the Ministry of Foreign Affairs sent an inquiry team to investigate some allegations against Khundoker. The Government of Bangladesh recalled Khundoker from Qatar, reportedly amid internal conflicts among Awami League leaders based in Doha. The decision was issued following a directive from the Prime Minister's Office under Prime Minister Sheikh Hasina. It drew criticism from several leaders of the Awami League's Qatar unit, who argued that the recall was unjustified. According to party leaders in Doha, tensions arose when the ambassador declined to accommodate certain demands from a local Bangabandhu Sainik League leader, who sought greater involvement in embassy-community relations. This role was traditionally coordinated through mainstream political party units, such as the Awami League. A delegation of senior Awami League figures from Qatar, including Unit President Omar Faruque Chowdhury, Senior Vice-president Shafiqul Islam Talukder Babu, and Bangabandhu Parishad Vice-president SM Faridul Haque, met with Prime Minister Sheikh Hasina and State Minister for Foreign Affairs Shahriar Alam in Dhaka to express their concerns. In October 2015, Ashud Ahmed replaced him as the ambassador of Bangladesh to Qatar.

From October 2015 to August 2019, Khundoker served as the principal of the Foreign Service Academy, a position later renamed rector. He organised Mujib Shotoborsho at the academy to mark the 100th birthday of the late President and founding father of Bangladesh, Sheikh Mujibur Rahman. He served as the rector of the Foreign Service Academy until March 2021 before being replaced by Ambassador Shabbir Ahmad Chowdhury. He was the vice-president of the BCS (Foreign Affairs) Association.
