= State Guest House Sugandha =

Bangladeshi Foreign Service Academy office

- রাষ্ট্রীয় অতিথি ভবন সুগন্ধা
- Interactive map of the State Guest House Sugandha area
- Former names: East Pakistan House (1954–1962); President's House (1962–1972); Ganabhaban (1972–1974)
- Alternative names: Old Ganabhaban

General information
- Status: Active
- Type: Building
- Architectural style: Gothic
- Location: 22 Bailey Road, Ramna, Dhaka, Bangladesh
- Coordinates: 23°44′25″N 90°24′08″E
- Current tenants: Ministry of Foreign Affairs
- Construction started: 1906
- Completed: 1910
- Opened: 1912
- Renovated: 1961
- Owner: Public Works Department

Technical details
- Floor count: 2

State Guest House Sugandha is a building located beside Hare Road in Dhaka, Bangladesh. Established by the British government in 1912, the building currently houses the office of the Foreign Service Academy.

== Location and architecture ==
Located in Dhaka, Bangladesh, this two-storey building has a floor area of 23,452 square feet. It is constructed with masonry. It is situated near Ramna Park.

== History ==
Its construction began in 1906 by the government of Eastern Bengal and Assam and was completed in 1910. The building was inaugurated in 1912. It formerly served as the residence of the District Magistrate of Dhaka. After the creation of Pakistan in 1947, it became the official residence of the Chief Secretary of East Bengal. In 1948, when Pakistan's governor-general Muhammad Ali Jinnah visited East Bengal (later renamed East Pakistan), the residence was prepared for his stay. In 24 March, during the Bengali Language Movement, a meeting was held here between the governor-general and the leaders of the State Language Action Committee. After 1954, the building became the official residence of East Bengal's Chief Minister.

In February 1961, when Queen Elizabeth II of the United Kingdom and her husband Prince Philip visited East Pakistan on a royal tour, they stayed in this building. The building was renovated in preparation for their visit. At the time, it was known as "East Pakistan House". During the 1960s, it was converted into one of the official residences of the president of Pakistan, and later became known as the "President's House".

In March 1971, during the Non-cooperation Movement, six meetings were held in this building between Pakistani president Yahya Khan and Sheikh Mujibur Rahman, president of the All-Pakistan Awami League. In 25 March, during Operation Searchlight, members of the East Pakistan Rifles stationed at the building were captured by the Pakistan Army, taken to the Ramna Kali Temple, and killed. During the war, detainees from various places were brought to the building, killed, and buried in Ramna Park.

After the independence of Bangladesh, the First Mujib ministry held its first meeting in the building in 1972. The building was renamed "Ganabhaban" and converted into the Prime Minister's Office, from where Sheikh Mujibur Rahman carried out his official duties as Prime Minister. Due to a lack of sufficient space, it was decided in 1973 to construct a new office building at Sher-e-Bangla Nagar, and the following year the office was moved to the newly constructed Ganabhaban.

In 1975, the building was designated as the official residence of the Vice President of Bangladesh. In 1997, the Foreign Service Academy established its temporary office in the building. On 18 April 2019, a corner commemorating the Bangladesh genocide was established in it. On 4 December 2024, a political dialogue between chief adviser Muhammad Yunus and representatives of eight political parties was held in the building. After Ganabhaban, which was the prime minister's residence that time, was declared the July Uprising Memorial Museum, Sugandha was proposed as prime minister's new official residence.
