= Jamil Majid =

Bangladeshi diplomat

- জামিল মজিদ

Ambassador of Bangladesh to Japan
- In office 12 April 1999 – 19 April 2002
- Preceded by: S.M. Rashed Ahmed
- Succeeded by: M. Serajul Islam

Jamil Majid is a Bangladeshi diplomat and former ambassador of Bangladesh to Japan. He is the former principal of the Bangladesh Foreign Service Academy.

== Career ==
Majid was the second secretary of the High Commission of Bangladesh to Canada in 1974. He was a director at the Ministry of Foreign Affairs in 1985. He served as a councilor at the High Commission of Bangladesh in India.

Majid was the deputy permanent representative of Bangladesh to the United Nations in New York City in 1993.

Majid then served as a Director General of the Ministry of Foreign Affairs.

In January 1999, Majid was appointed ambassador of Bangladesh to Japan and assumed the role in June.

Majid was appointed Principal of the Bangladesh Foreign Service in June 2002 replacing Syed Muazzem Ali.

Majid contract for principal of the Bangladesh Foreign Service Academy was cancelled in November 2006. Md. Saiful Amin Khan succeeded him at the academy.
