= Bangladesh–Norway relations =

- Bangladesh: Norway

Bangladesh–Norway relations refer to interstate relations between Bangladesh and Norway. Espen Rikter-Svendsen is the ambassador of Norway to Bangladesh. Norway has an embassy in Dhaka.

== History ==
Norway established ties with Bangladesh on 14 April 1972 and maintains an embassy in Gulshan, Dhaka. From 1970s to the 1990s, Bangladesh was one of the largest recipient of foreign aid from Norway. Norway had also provided funding to Grameen Bank. Bangladesh is the Norway fourth largest recipient of aid.

Concerts Norway has been working with musicians in Bangladesh. Dilek Ayhan, Norwegian deputy trade minister, has expressed interest in investing the mobile and heath sectors of Bangladesh in 2016.

The Foreign Secretary of Bangladesh, Shahidul Haque, visited Oslo on 28 March 2018 and met with his counterpart, Wegger Christian Strømmen.

In March 2017, Norway and United Nations Development Programme signed an agreement to work together to support Rohingya refugees in Bangladesh.

The 1st Political Consolations took place between Bangladesh and Norway on 28 June 2018.

On 3 March 2020, Bangladesh and Norway held the 2nd Political Consultations meeting in Dhaka. Norway has expressed interest in investing in shipbuilding in Bangladesh. In August 2020, the Government of Norway allocated US$1.5 million to improve ship recycling in Bangladesh. Bangladesh has called for more investments from Norway.

Norway's Telenor owned Grameenphone is the largest telecommunication service provider in Bangladesh and the Norwegian government has provided support for the company in Bangladesh in its dispute with Bangladesh Telecommunication Regulatory Commission, the regulatory agency.
