= Shafiqur Rahman (diplomat) =

Bangladeshi diplomat

- শফিকুর রহমান

Ambassador of Bangladesh to Nepal
- Incumbent
- Assumed office 12 June 2025
- Preceded by: Salahuddin Noman Chowdhury

Personal details
- Born: Md. Shafiqur Rahman
- Education: University of Rajshahi

Shafiqur Rahman is a Bangladeshi diplomat. Since June 2025 he has been the ambassador of Bangladesh to Nepal.

== Education and career ==
Rahman earned his bachelor's and master's in English language and literature from the University of Rajshahi. He then got another master's in international relations from International University of Japan in Nigata.

Rahman joined Bangladesh Foreign service in 2003 as a Cadre officer in the 21st batch (FA) of the BCS Exam.
