= Enamul Kabir =

- এনামুল কবির

Ambassador of Bangladesh to South Korea
- In office 11 August 2012 – 31 December 2014
- Preceded by: M Shahidul Islam
- Succeeded by: Zulfiqur Rahman

Ambassador of Bangladesh to France
- In office 9 June 2008 – 3 August 2012
- Preceded by: Ruhul Amin
- Succeeded by: M Shahidul Islam

Ambassador of Bangladesh to Vietnam
- In office July 2006 – 2008

Ambassador of Bangladesh to Bhutan
- In office 29 January 2004 – 13 July 2006
- Preceded by: Ahmed Rahim
- Succeeded by: A.K.M. Atiqur Rahman

Personal details
- Education: University of Dhaka

Enamul Kabir is a former diplomat. He served as an ambassador of Bangladesh to France, South Korea, Bhutan, and Vietnam.

== Background and career ==
Enamul Kabir earned his bachelor’s and master’s degrees in economics from the University of Dhaka in 1975. He received DESS degree from France.

Kabir belonged to the 1981 batch of Bangladesh Civil Service (Foreign Affairs). He had served Bangladesh Missions in Manila, Paris, Karachi, Birmingham and Hanoi in different positions.

Kabir was also a Permanent Delegate of Bangladesh to UNESCO in Paris.

Kabir retired from the government service in 2014.

== Death ==
Kabir passed away on 31 December 2025 at the age of 71. Following his demise, the Embassy of Bangladesh in Hanoi, Vietnam, issued an official condolence message honoring his distinguished diplomatic service and career.
