= Abdus Sobhan Sikder =

Bangladeshi diplomat

Ambassador of Bangladesh to Italy
- In office 5 September 2016 – 31 October 2020
- Preceded by: Md Shahdat Hossain
- Succeeded by: M. Shameem Ahsan

Principal Secretary to the Prime Minister

Prime Minister's Office
- In office 11 February 2014 – 15 February 2015
- Preceded by: Sheikh Mohammad Wahid Uz Zaman
- Succeeded by: Abul Kalam Azad

Personal details
- Born: 16 February 1956 (age 70) Barisal, East Pakistan, Pakistan
- Education: University of Dhaka; University of Manchester
- Occupation: Government official, Secretary

Abdus Sobhan Sikder is a retired Bangladeshi senior secretary and former ambassador of Bangladesh to Italy. He is the former principal secretary to prime minister Sheikh Hasina. He is a former secretary of the Ministry of Home Affairs.

== Early life ==
Sikder finished his undergrad and masters in English at the University of Dhaka.

== Career ==
Sikder was the secretary of the Implementation Monitoring and Evaluation Division in 2008.

Sikder was the secretary of the Ministry of Home Affairs in 2010 when 20 websites of organizations under the Prime Minister's Office were hacked by Indian hackers. Lieutenant colonel Ziaul Ahsan was responsible for tracking down the hackers and Yeafesh Osman was responsible for bring them back online. He ordered actions against stalkers harassing students. He oversaw the investigation into Bangladesh Rifles revolt. He oversaw the rebranding of Bangladesh Rifles to Border Guard Bangladesh and formation of the National Committee for Intelligence Coordination. He was present at the execution of five killers of former president Sheikh Mujibur Rahman.

In 2012, Sikder was the secretary of the Ministry of Public Administration. He saw the recruitment of four thousand doctors through a special examination of the Bangladesh Civil Service. He carried out mass promotions in the civil service and increasing the retirement age of secretaries. He was criticized for meeting with Hossain Toufique Imam along with a number of civil servants in December 2013. Questions were raised about serving civil servants having a meeting with Imam as he was the co-chairman of Election Steering Committee of the Awami League.

Sikder was the principal secretary to prime minister Sheikh Hasina in 2014. He replaced secretary Shaikh Md Wahid-uz Zaman.

Sikder was appointed ambassador of Bangladesh to Italy in May 2016. He replaced Md Shahdat Hossain who was appointed ambassador of Bangladesh to Belgium. In February 2020, he received Prime Minister Sheikh Hasina who was on a bilateral visit to meet with Prime Minister of Italy Giuseppe Conte.

After the fall of the Sheikh Hasina led Awami League government, a murder case was filed against Sikder by Bangladesh Nationalist Party politician Mohammad Zaman Hossain Khan over the death of a protestor in July 2024.
