= Mahmood Hasan =

Bangladeshi diplomat

Ambassador of Bangladesh to France
- In office 6 August 2005 – 21 March 2007
- Preceded by: Jahangir Saadat
- Succeeded by: Ruhul Amin

Ambassador of Bangladesh to Egypt
- In office 2 September 2002 – 30 July 2005
- Preceded by: M. Serajul Islam
- Succeeded by: Rezaul Karim

Personal details
- Education: University of Dhaka

Mahmood Hasan is a Bangladeshi diplomat. He served as an ambassador of Bangladesh to Egypt.

== Career ==
Mahmood Hasan earned his bachelor's and master's degrees in economics from the University of Dhaka. He belonged to the 1979 batch of Bangladesh Civil Service (Foreign Affairs).

Hasan was a director of the SAARC secretariat.

Hasan served in the Ministry of Foreign Affairs, and the Bangladesh missions in New Delhi, Yangon, Kabul and Paris.
