= AKM (disambiguation) =

An AKM is an assault rifle designed by Soviet small arms designer Mikhail Kalashnikov in 1959.

AKM may also refer to:

== Businesses and organisations ==
- AKM Semiconductor, a semiconductor manufacturer headquartered in San Jose, California
- Alpha Kappa Mu, an American collegiate honor society
- Atatürk Cultural Center (Atatürk Kültür Merkezi), a cultural center in Istanbul
- Gesellschaft der Autoren, Komponisten und Musikverleger, the Austrian copyright collection agency
- Vanguard of Red Youth (Авангард красной молодёжи), a radical Russian socialist youth group

== Other uses ==
- Abul Kalam Mohammad (disambiguation), a common compound male given name in Bangladesh
- Apogee kick motor, a rocket motor that is regularly employed on artificial satellites
