= M. Serajul Islam =

Bangladeshi diplomat (1947–2024)

Ambassador of Bangladesh to Japan
- In office 31 July 2002 – 17 April 2006
- Preceded by: Jamil Majid
- Succeeded by: Ashraf-ud-Doula

Ambassador of Bangladesh to Egypt
- In office 3 June 1999 – 15 July 2002
- Preceded by: M. Ruhul Amin
- Succeeded by: Mahmood Hasan

Personal details
- Born: 27 April 1947
- Died: 11 August 2024 (aged 77) Washington D.C., United States
- Education: University of Dhaka

M. Serajul Islam (27 April 1947 – 11 August 2024) was a Bangladeshi diplomat and former ambassador of Bangladesh to Japan. He was the ambassador of Bangladesh to Egypt. He worked as the Director of the Centre for Foreign Affairs Studies.

== Early life ==
Islam was born on 27 April 1947. He did his bachelor's and master's in political science at the University of Dhaka in 1968 and 1969 respectively. He was the captain of the Dhaka University Tennis Team.

== Career ==
Islam joined the foreign service of Pakistan and moved to the Bangladesh Foreign Service after the Independence of Bangladesh. He was a lecturer of political science at the University of Dhaka. He served in diplomatic missions in China, India, and the United States. He was the Director General of South Asia wing and the Far East wing at the Ministry of Foreign Affairs.

From 1998 to 2002, Islam served as the ambassador of Bangladesh to Egypt. On 31 July 2002, Islam was appointed ambassador of Bangladesh to Japan replacing Jamil Majid.

In 2008, Islam expressed critical opinions on foreign diplomats violating norms in Dhaka by engaging in politics and activism, especially against the Bangladesh Nationalist Party government.

Islam was the Director of the Centre for Foreign Affairs Studies. On Islamic extremism and terrorism, he said "There is no reason for complacency about Islamic terrorism in Bangladesh but no reason to cry wolf either". In 2009, he called for the establishment of a National Security Council of Bangladesh. He accused the government of Myanmar of committing genocide and ethnic cleansing against the Rohingya People comparing it to what Bangladeshis faced during the Bangladesh genocide.

Islam warned the Awami League not to repeat the 2014 election in 2018 as it would destroy multiparty democracy in Bangladesh and expressed his support for the Jatiya Oikya Front. He was an executive director of the Southeast Bank Limited.

== Death ==
Islam died on 11 August 2024 in Washington D.C., United States.
