= Ruhul Amin (diplomat) =

Bangladeshi diplomat

- রুহুল আমিন

Ambassador of Bangladesh to France
- In office 30 July 2007 – 3 January 2008
- Preceded by: Mahmood Hasan
- Succeeded by: Enamul Kabir

Ambassador of Bangladesh to Bahrain
- In office 10 February 2006 – 22 July 2007
- Preceded by: Anwarullah Chowdhury
- Succeeded by: Md. Ali Akbar

Personal details
- Died: 2 January 2008 (aged 48) Paris, France
- Education: Jahangirnagar University; Sorbonne University

Ruhul Amin (died on 3 January 2008) was a Bangladeshi diplomat. He served as an ambassador of Bangladesh to Bahrain and France.

== Career ==
Ruhul Amin studied English literature at Jahangirnagar University. He belonged to 1984 Bangladesh Civil Service batch. He completed his post graduate studies at the Sorbonne University. He was transferred to the UN headquarters in New York as the deputy to the Permanent Representative of Bangladesh to the UN.

Amin moved to Dhaka to become director general of the SAARC desk and coordinated the Dhaka SAARC summit held in 2005. He was then appointed as the ambassador of Bangladesh to Bahrain which he had served from February 2006 until July 2007.

On 2 January 2008, Amin suffered a stroke and collapsed while he was returning in a car to Bangladesh mission in Paris after a meeting at the French foreign ministry. He died due to brain hemorrhage the next day. His body arrived Dhaka on 8 January and later buried at Mirpur graveyard.
