= Rezaqul Haider (general) =

Bangladeshi military personnel

Ambassador of Bangladesh to Turkey
- In office 26 September 2005 – 25 March 2007
- Preceded by: ATM Nazrul Islam
- Succeeded by: Mohammed Ishtiaq

14th Director General of Bangladesh Rifles
- In office 1 December 2001 – 21 January 2003
- President: A. Q. M. Badruddoza Chowdhury; Muhammad Jamiruddin Sircar (acting); Iajuddin Ahmed
- Prime Minister: Khaleda Zia
- Preceded by: Mohammad Abu Ishaque Ibrahim
- Succeeded by: Jahangir Alam Chowdhury

Personal details
- Born: 18 April 1951 (age 75) Dacca, East Bengal, Pakistan
- Education: Faujdarhat Cadet College; East Bengal Regimental School; Pakistan Military Academy; Allahabad University

Military service
- Allegiance: Pakistan (before 1974); Bangladesh
- Branch/service: Pakistan Army; Bangladesh Army; Bangladesh Rifles
- Years of service: 1971 – 2006
- Rank: Major General
- Unit: Frontier Force Regiment; East Bengal Regiment
- Commands: Commandant of Defence Services Command and Staff College; GOC of 66th Infantry Division; Director General of Bangladesh Rifles; Commandant of East Bengal Regimental Centre
- Battles/wars: Bangladesh Liberation War; UNAMET

Rezaqul Haider is a retired Bangladeshi major general who is the former director of the Border Guard Bangladesh. Haider also served as the ambassador of Bangladesh to Turkey.

== Early life ==
Haider was born on 18 April 1951 in Dhaka. He passed both SSC and HSC from Faujdarhat Cadet College. He did his graduation in Bachelor of Arts under the Pakistan Military Academy and a Masters in Defence Studies from Allahabad University, India.

== Career ==
He was a student of the 45th PMA long course. Haider was commissioned on 29 August 1971. He was later repatriated in 1974.

He became director general of the Bangladesh Rifles on 1 December 2001. He has worked at UNAMET for UNTAET as chief military observer. He is the recipient of The Wiesel Ethics Award 2000 for his contributions to the international civil service.

While he was commandant of the Defence Services Command and Staff College, he was supposed to be appointed army chief by Prime Minister Khaleda Zia. But Moeen U Ahmed managed his appointment by cancelling the decision through his batchmate, Major (rtd) Sayeed Eskandar, the younger brother of Khaleda Zia.

In 2005, he was appointed as the ambassador of Bangladesh to Turkey.

== See also ==
Rezzakul Haider Chowdhury
