= Sadia Faizunnesa =

Bangladeshi diplomat

- সাদিয়া ফাইজুন্নেসা
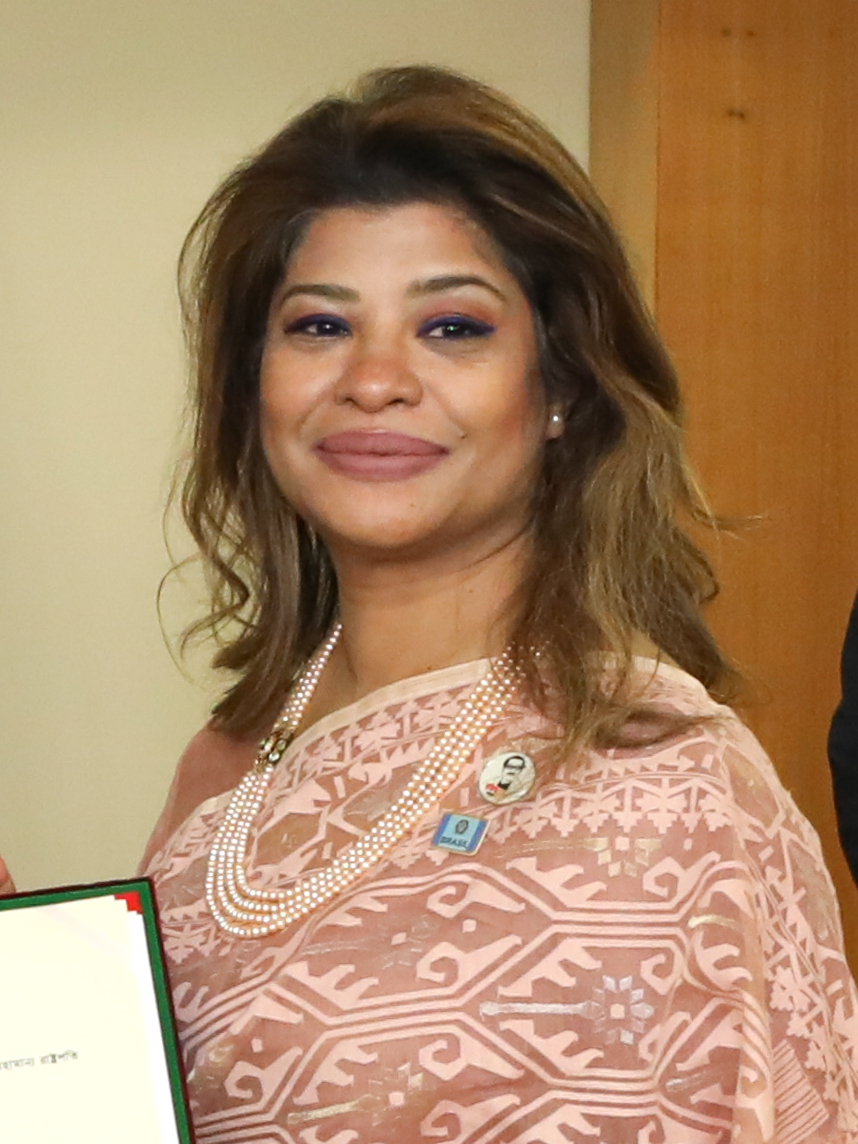
- Faizunnesa in 2022

Ambassador of Bangladesh to Morocco
- Incumbent
- Assumed office June 2025
- Preceded by: Mohammad Harun Al Rashid

Ambassador of Bangladesh to Brazil
- In office 17 October 2022 – 15 May 2025
- Preceded by: Zulfiqur Rahman
- Succeeded by: Md. Tauhedul Islam

Personal details
- Education: Sir Salimullah Medical College; BRAC University

Sadia Faizunnesa is a Bangladeshi diplomat and the incumbent ambassador to Morocco. She was a former ambassador of Bangladesh to Brazil.

Prior to this position, she served as the Consul General of Bangladesh in New York from June 2018 to October 2021.

== Early life and education ==
Sadia Faizunnesa earned her Bachelor of Medicine and Surgery (MBBS) degree from Sir Salimullah Medical College under the University of Dhaka. She went on to receive a Master’s degree in Development Studies from BRAC University, where she was awarded the Vice Chancellor’s Gold Medal for academic excellence. During her college years, she was also a national-level debater, winning the national TV Debate Championship in 1994 and finishing runner-up the year before.

== Career ==
Sadia Faizunnesa is a career diplomat who joined the Bangladesh Civil Service (Foreign Affairs cadre) in 1999 as part of the 18th BCS batch.

She has held several senior roles at the Ministry of Foreign Affairs, including serving as Director General for the United Nations Wing at the Foreign Ministry headquarters in Dhaka. Faizunnesa also served as Deputy Permanent Representative of Bangladesh to the United Nations in New York, representing the country in multilateral diplomacy between 2013 and 2016.

She has been posted in various capacities at Bangladesh missions in Bangkok and Berlin, and served in multiple wings at the Foreign Ministry headquarters. From June 2018 to October 2021, she held the position of Consul General of Bangladesh in New York, marking the first time a female career diplomat occupied that role.

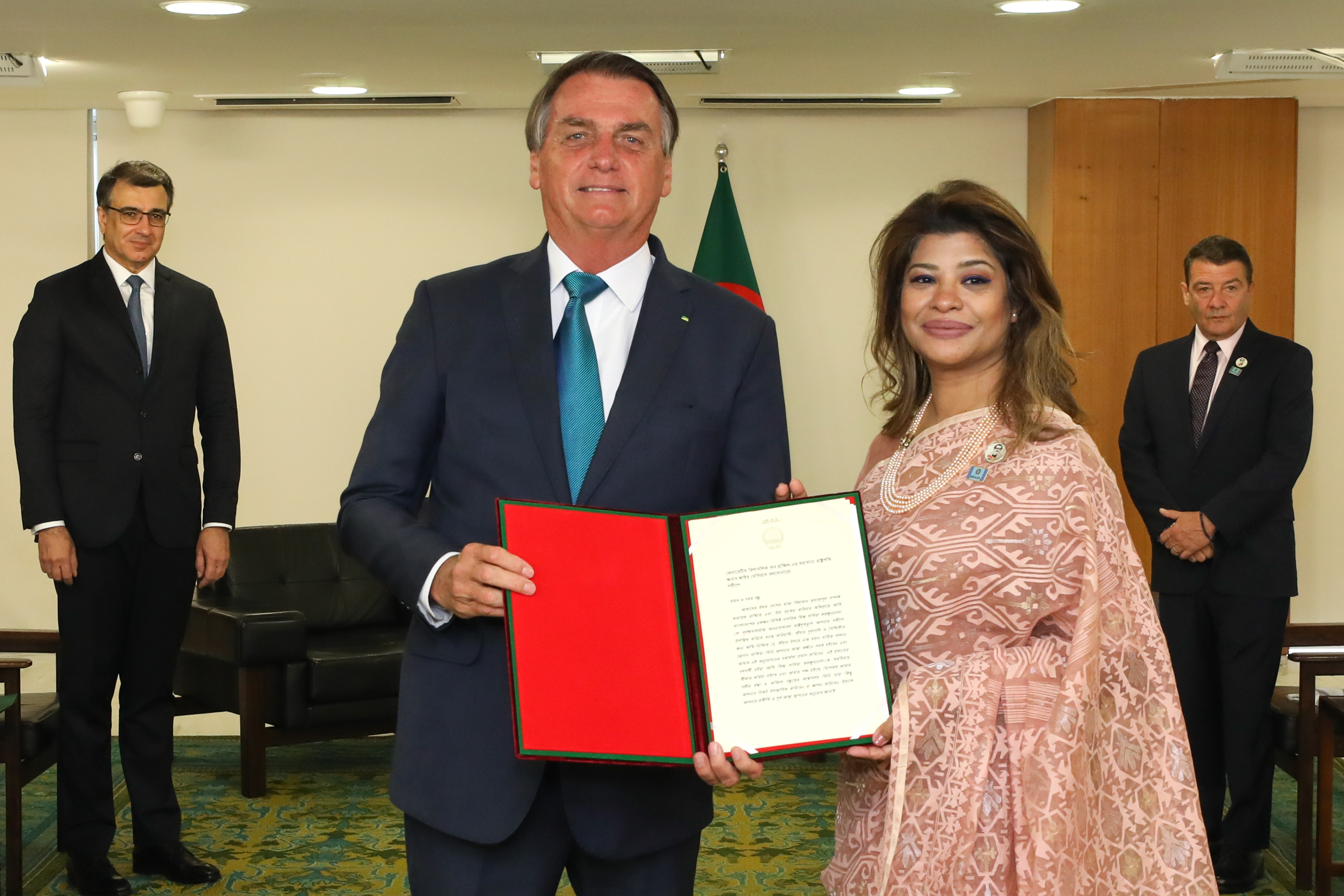
Faizunnesa presenting her ambassador credentials to the President of Brazil, Jair Bolsonaro.

On 2 August 2021, the government appointed her as Ambassador of Bangladesh to Brazil, and she officially assumed the office on 17 October 2021.
