= Md. Touhid Hossain =

Bangladeshi diplomat and government adviser (born 1955)

Mohammad Touhid Hossain
- মোহাম্মদ তৌহিদ হোসেন
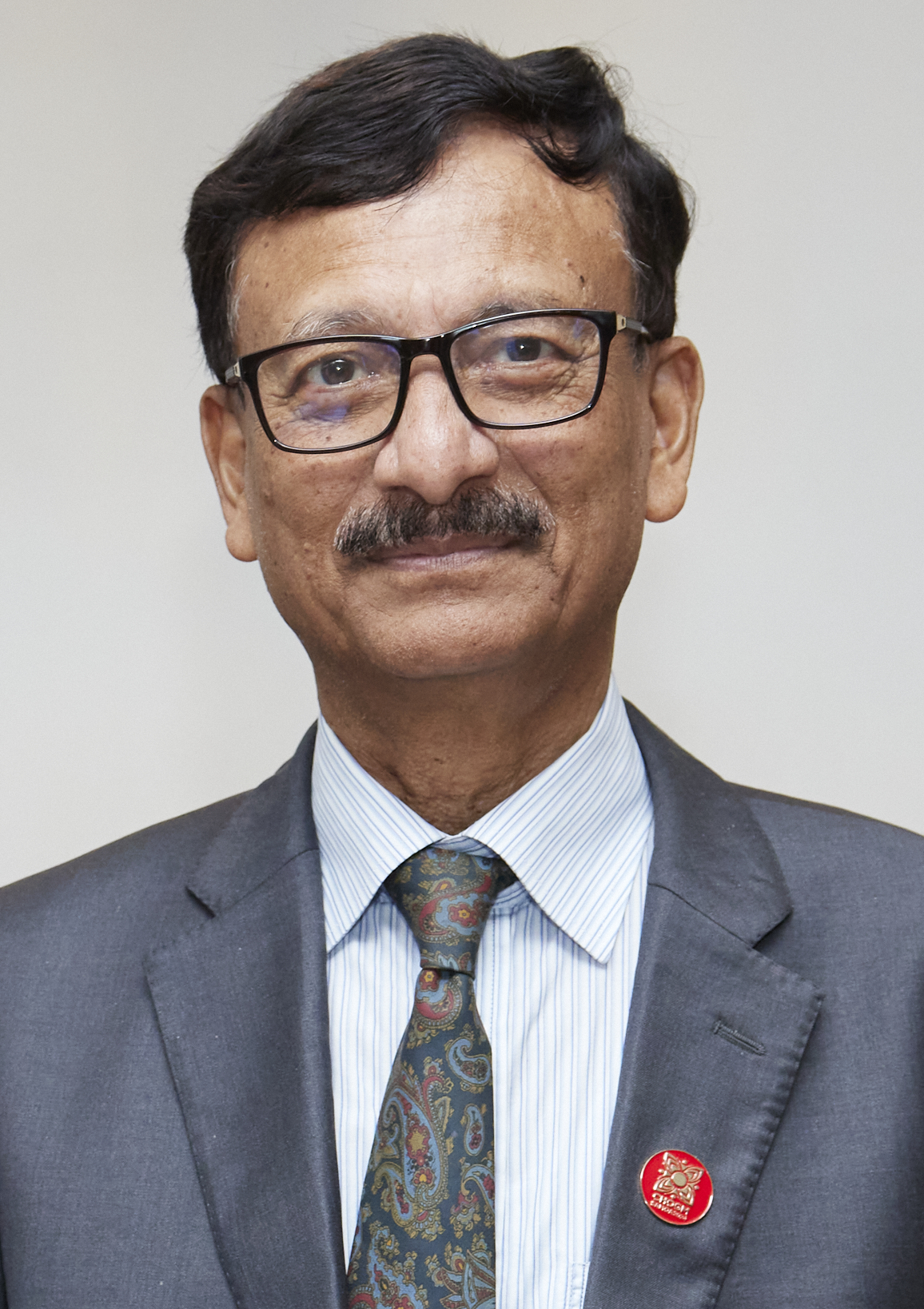
- Hossain in 2024

Adviser of Foreign Affairs
- In office 9 August 2024 – 17 February 2026
- President: Mohammed Shahabuddin
- Chief Adviser: Muhammad Yunus
- Preceded by: Hasan Mahmud
- Succeeded by: Khalilur Rahman

Personal details
- Born: 1 February 1955 (age 71) Dacca District, East Bengal, Dominion of Pakistan
- Party: Independent
- Education: Rajshahi Cadet College; University of Dhaka
- Profession: Diplomat

Mohammad Touhid Hossain (Bengali: মোহাম্মদ তৌহিদ হোসেন; born 1 February 1955) is the incumbent Adviser of Foreign Affairs to the Interim government of Bangladesh and a former foreign secretary of Bangladesh. He also served as a High commissioner of Bangladesh to South Africa.

== Early life ==
Hossain was born on 1 February 1955. He was a student of the 4th intake of Rajshahi Cadet College and completed his SSC and HSC there. He completed his master's degree in history from the University of Dhaka.

== Career ==
Hossain joined the Bangladesh Foreign Service in 1981.

He secured 4th position in combined merit list. From January 1999 to February 2000, Hossain served as the principal of the Foreign Service Academy.

Hossain was the deputy high commissioner of Bangladesh in Kolkata from 2001 to 2005. He attended the 6th International Shillong Trade Fair and refuted Indian allegations of illegal migrants in the North East India. He blamed India's lack of willingness for the lack of development in Bangladesh-India relations.

From 17 December 2006 to 8 July 2009, Hossain was the foreign secretary of Bangladesh. From 29 to 30 August 2007 he hosted a delegation led by his counterpart in Pakistan, Riaz Mohammad Khan.

From July 2009 to July 2012, Hossain served as the principal of the Foreign Service Academy. In June 2012, Hossain was appointed the high commissioner of Bangladesh to South Africa. He blamed the death of Bangladeshi expats in South Africa on a lack of law and order. In September 2012, the Bangladesh High Commission in South Africa was robbed and in March 2013 the ambassador's residence was robbed and Hossain's wife was held at gunpoint.

Hossain was the chief guest at the Bangladesh University of Professionals International Model United Nations in September 2019.

Hossain was the keynote speaker in March 2021 conference on Bangladesh turning 50 organized by Bangladesh Institute of Law and International Affairs. In September 2021, Hossain was a guest presented at a seminar on disinformation and reporting for Bangladeshi journalists organized by the United States Agency for International Development.

== Controversy ==
On October 28, 2025, in response to a question from journalists about Zakir Naik's arrival in Bangladesh on November 28, 2025, he said that he did not know that Zakir Naik would come to Bangladesh, he first heard about it from journalists, but he can only say that anyone who "creates trouble" will not be allowed to come to Bangladesh. On 5 November 2025, the Bangladesh Salafi Association demanded the resignation of Jahangir Alam and Towhid Hossain in protest against the ban on Zakir Naik from entering Bangladesh.
