= Mohiuddin Ahmed (foreign secretary) =

Bangladeshi diplomat (?-2022)

- মহিউদ্দিন আহমেদ
- Born: 1942
- Died: 20 June 2022 (aged 79–80); Dhaka, Bangladesh
- Occupations: Diplomat, civil servant, freedom fighter

Mohiuddin Ahmed (c. 1942 – 20 June 2022) was a Bangladeshi diplomat, civil servant, and veteran of the Bangladesh Liberation War. He served as a secretary at the Ministry of Foreign Affairs,

represented Bangladesh in various international missions, and played a prominent role in the Bangladesh Liberation War.

== Career ==
Ahmed began his diplomatic career with the Pakistan Foreign Service and was posted as the second secretary at the High Commission of Pakistan in London in 1971. He became the first Bengali diplomat in Europe to publicly support the Bangladesh Liberation War. On 1 August 1971, Ahmed expressed his allegiance to the cause of Bangladeshi independence by speaking at a major protest rally at Trafalgar Square, London, under the slogan "Stop Genocide: Recognise Bangladesh." His defection was a significant morale boost for the Provisional Government of Bangladesh.

Following independence, Ahmed served Bangladesh in various diplomatic capacities at missions located in New Delhi, Geneva, Jakarta, Jeddah, and New York City. He later held senior posts within the Ministry of Foreign Affairs, including Secretary of the Ministry of Foreign Affairs. He was the Principal of the Foreign Service Academy from February 2000 to January 2001.

== Death ==
Mohiuddin Ahmed died on 20 June 2022 at his residence in Uttara, Dhaka, following a prolonged illness at 80. He was receiving treatment at Bangabandhu Sheikh Mujib Medical University. AK Abdul Momen, Minister of Foreign Affairs, and Prime Minister Sheikh Hasina sent their condolences.
