= Mohammad Ishtiaq (general) =

Bangladeshi Major General and diplomat

- মোহাম্মদ ইশতিয়াক

Ambassador of Bangladesh to Turkey
- In office 17 August 2007 – 23 December 2009
- Preceded by: Rezaqul Haider
- Succeeded by: Zulfiqur Rahman

Personal details
- Education: Defence Services Command and Staff College; National Defence College

Military service
- Allegiance: Bangladesh
- Branch/service: Bangladesh Army
- Rank: Major General

Major General Mohammad Ishtiaq is a retired military personnel and a diplomat from Bangladesh. He served as an ambassador of Bangladesh to Turkey during

== Career ==
Mohammad Ishtiaq completed his master's in defence studies from the Defence Services Command and Staff College and National Defence College.

Ishtiaq served as GOC, Brigade Commander, Commandant, Commanding Officer, General Staff Officer and Director of the Welfare Directorate in the Bangladesh Army.

Prior to becoming the ambassador to Turkey, Ishtiaq served as military secretary to the prime minister and to the chief adviser of the caretaker government.
