= Rezaul Karim (diplomat) =

Bangladeshi diplomat

- রেজাউল করিম

Ambassador of Bangladesh to Egypt
- In office 30 August 2005 – 29 October 2005
- Preceded by: Mahmood Hasan
- Succeeded by: Nasim Ferdous

Ambassador of Bangladesh to the Soviet Union
- In office 6 August 1986 – 19 January 1989
- Preceded by: Syed Najmuddin Hashim
- Succeeded by: A.K.M. Nazrul Islam

Personal details
- Born: 1935 Kushtia, Bengal Presidency, British India
- Died: 29 October 2005 (aged 69–70) Cairo, Egypt
- Occupation: Diplomat

Mir Mohammad Rezaul Karim (1935 – 29 October 2005) was a Bangladeshi diplomat, philanthropist and writer.

== Education and career ==
Rezaul Karim earned his bachelor's in economics from the University of Dhaka, master's in public administration from Karachi University, and another master's from the Fletcher School of Law and Diplomacy.

During the 1971 Liberation War, Rezaul Karim was posted as the first secretary in London at the Pakistan High Commission. He served as the deputy high commissioner and went to India in the late 1970s. He went on to serve as the ambassador to China, Iraq, Iran, Egypt and the Soviet Union, and high commissioner to Sri Lanka and the United Kingdom. He retired from the foreign service in 1992.

== Personal life ==
Karim was married to Salma. Together they had three children, Jalal, Shahed and Seema, who went on to have his grandchildren Alisa, Shaida and Zeyd.
