= Mohammad Harun Al Rashid =

- মোহাম্মদ হারুন আল রশিদ

Ambassador of Bangladesh to Morocco
- In office October 2023 – 11 December 2024
- Preceded by: Md Shahdat Hossain
- Succeeded by: Sadia Faizunnesa

Personal details
- Born: Feni District
- Education: University of Dhaka

Mohammad Harun Al Rashid is a Bangladeshi diplomat and former ambassador of Bangladesh to Morocco.

== Early life ==
Rashid was born in Feni District. He did his bachelors in physics at the University of Dhaka.

== Career ==
Rashid joined the 20th batch of Bangladesh Civil Service in 2001 as a foreign service cadre. He has served in the embassy of Bangladesh in Cairo, Mexico City, Madrid, and Rome. He was the director-general of the public diplomacy wing at the Ministry of Foreign Affairs.

Rashid was appointed the ambassador of Bangladesh to Morocco in October 2023. He was the former deputy high commissioner of Bangladesh to Canada.

After the fall of the Sheikh Hasina led Awami League government, Rashid was ordered to return home in December 2024. He delayed his return then posted on Facebook against the Muhammad Yunus led interim government. He had titled his post, "A Plea for Bangladesh-and for Myself Subject: Bangladesh's Descent into Anarchy under Yunus-The World's Silence is painful", and in response, the interim government cancelled his and his family's passports. It was reported that Rashid had moved to Ottawa, Canada.
