= Zulfiqur Rahman =

Bangladeshi diplomat

- জুলফিকুর রহমান
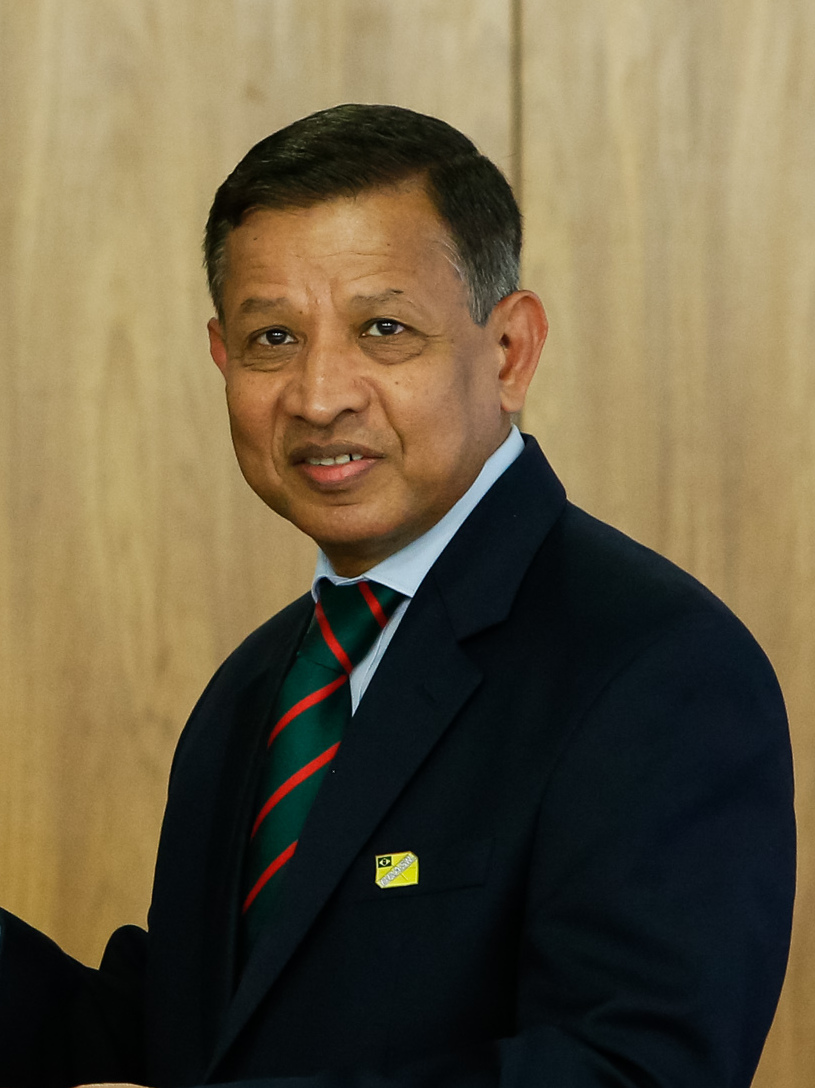
- Rahman at the presentation ceremony in Brasília (2018)

Ambassador of Bangladesh to Brazil
- In office 26 December 2017 – 21 December 2020
- Preceded by: Mohamed Mijarul Quayes
- Succeeded by: Sadia Faizunnesa

Ambassador of Bangladesh to South Korea
- In office 23 May 2015 – 13 December 2017
- Preceded by: Enamul Kabir
- Succeeded by: Abida Islam

Ambassador of Bangladesh to Turkey
- In office 22 August 2010 – 15 May 2015
- Preceded by: Mohammed Ishtiaq
- Succeeded by: M Allama Siddiki

Zulfiqur Rahman is a Bangladeshi diplomat. Prior to this position, he served as the Bangladesh ambassador to Brazil, South Korea, and Turkey.

== Career ==
Rahman joined the foreign service cadre in 1991. He had served in Bangladesh missions in New Delhi, New York City, Manama and Los Angeles. He then served as the director general of the Ministry of Foreign Affairs.
