= M. N. I. Chaudhury =

Bangladeshi diplomat and academic

- এম. এন. আই. চৌধুরী

Ambassador of Bangladesh to Nepal
- In office 7 December 1975 – 23 December 1979
- Preceded by: Position created
- Succeeded by: Mominuddin Ahmed

Personal details
- Born: Pabna, Bengal Presidency, British India
- Died: 18 August 2011 (aged 87) Dhaka, Bangladesh
- Occupation: Diplomat, civil servant, academic

M. N. I. Chaudhury (1923/1924 – 18 August 2011) was a Bangladeshi diplomat, academic, and retired government secretary. He was the ambassador of Bangladesh to Nepal.

== Early life and education ==
Chaudhury was born in Bagha, Pabna District. He earned distinction during his university years, receiving the University of Dhaka's Chancellor's gold medal.

== Career ==
Chaudhury joined the 49th batch of the Foreign Service of Pakistan. He was the third secretary at the Embassy of Pakistan in Iraq in the 1950s. He served as the first secretary in the Embassy of Pakistan to the United States. He was the acting High Commissioner of Pakistan to Nigeria. He was Pakistan's ambassador to the Republic of Dahomey, Cameroon and Niger. He joined the Foreign Service of Bangladesh after the Independence of Bangladesh. He became the country's first envoy to Nepal, stationed there. He served as Bangladesh's ambassador to Nepal from 7 December 1975 to 23 December 1979. The Nepal Post (Biweekly) described him as the "Doyen" of the diplomats in Kathmandu.

Chaudhury served in several missions, including postings in Washington, D.C., New York, Lagos, Cairo, Riyadh, and Sittwe. He was also a former secretary to the Government of Bangladesh. He served as the first Ambassador of Bangladesh to Nepal and was the founding principal of the Foreign Service Training Institute, which later became the Bangladesh Foreign Service Academy.

In addition to his diplomatic service, Chaudhury taught in the Departments of Political Science and International Relations at the University of Dhaka.

== Death ==
Chaudhury passed away on 18 August 2011 at his residence in Dhaka.

== Personal life ==
Chaudhury and his wife had three daughters and one son. His son-in-law was the Foreign Secretary, Mohamed Mijarul Quayes.
