= Anwarullah Chowdhury =

Bangladeshi academic

Ambassador of Bangladesh to Bahrain
- In office 15 March 2003 – 30 January 2006
- Preceded by: Mohammad Azizur Rahman
- Succeeded by: Ruhul Amin

Vice-Chancellor of the University of Dhaka
- In office 12 November 2001 – 31 July 2002
- Preceded by: Abul Kalam Azad Chowdhury
- Succeeded by: A F M Yusuf Haider

Personal details
- Born: 1945 (age 80–81) Feni District, Bengal Presidency, British India
- Education: University of Dhaka; Delhi School of Economics
- Occupation: university academic

Anwarullah Chowdhury is a Bangladeshi academic. He served as the 24th vice-chancellor of the University of Dhaka. He was the ambassador of Bangladesh to Bahrain during 2003–2006.

== Education and career ==
Chowdhury earned his master's degree in sociology from the University of Dhaka and Ph.D. from Delhi School of Economics.

Chowdhury was a member of University Grants Commission, a visiting professor of Minnesota State University, a visiting fellow of University of Sussex and dean of the faculty of Social Science. He is the founder chairman of the Anthropology Department of the University of Dhaka.

Chowdhury was appointed the vice-chancellor of Green University of Bangladesh in February 2008 and Bangladesh Islami University in April 2014.

=== Controversy ===
On 1 August 2002, Chowdhury, along with proctor Nazrul Islam, resigned from the vice-chancellor position of the University of Dhaka following an assault into Shamsunnahar Hall, a female hall, by male police on 23 July. The female students had been protesting the illegal stay of political activists in the university dormitories. Chowdhury faced criticism at that time for failing to take measures against the police assault.

In August 2015, a trust fund, worth of 600,000 Taka, named "Professor DR Anwarullah Chowdhury Trust Fund" was established at the Anthropology Department of the University of Dhaka. The trust fund was revoked within a month, following student protests against it.

In February 2018, Chowdhury was appointed as a part-time teacher of the anthropology department. But he was relieved from the duty within a week.
