= Ashraf-ud-Doula =

Bangladeshi diplomat, secretary, and retired Major

Ambassador of Bangladesh to Japan
- In office 1 July 2006 – 24 March 2010
- Preceded by: M. Serajul Islam
- Succeeded by: A. K. M. Majibur Rahman Bhuiyan

High Commissioner of Bangladesh to Sri Lanka
- In office 16 August 1998 – 31 May 2003
- Preceded by: Masum Ahmed Chowdhury
- Succeeded by: A. M. Yakub Ali

Ashraf-ud-Doula is a Bangladeshi diplomat, secretary, and retired Major. He is the former ambassador of Bangladesh to Japan. He is a former ambassador of Bangladesh to Vietnam. He served as the High Commissioner of Bangladesh to Australia.

== Career ==
Doula was commissioned into Bangladesh Army as part of the second war course during Bangladesh Liberation War. He retired from Bangladesh Army as a major.

Doula joined the foreign service of Bangladesh Civil Service in 1977. He has served in Bangladesh missions in Germany, Singapore, Sri Lanka, Italy, and United Kingdom. In October 2004, he was appointed the High Commissioner of Bangladesh to Australia.

In January 2006, Doula donated 530 thousand taka to Ekushe Academy Australia Inc to erect a monument to the Bengali Language Movement on behalf of Prime Minister Khaleda Zia. In May 2006, he was appointed the ambassador of Bangladesh to Japan. He replaced ambassador M. Serajul Islam. In October 2009, he received an extension on his term. He served as the ambassador till August 2010 before being replaced by A.K.M. Majibur Rahman Bhuiyan.

In 2018, Doula contested the national election from Kurigram-4 as a candidate of the Jatiya Party and received 333 votes. He called for respecting the Bangladesh Liberation War. In January 2022, he called on Prime Minister Sheikh Hasina to negotiate with opposition leaders.

After the fall of the Sheikh Hasina led Awami League government, Doula defended the conditions of Hindus in Bangladesh and said those attacked were attacked for supporting the deposed Awami League.
