= Md Shahdat Hossain =

Bangladeshi diplomat

- মোঃ শাহাদাত হোসেন
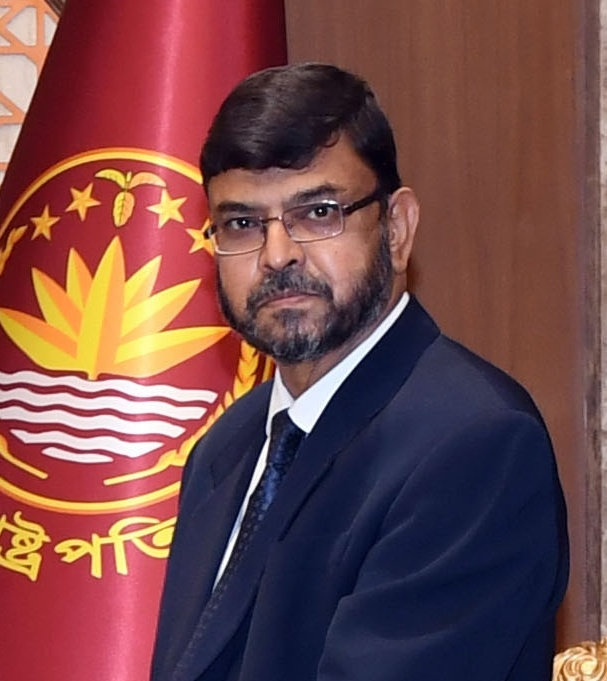
- Hossain in 2021

Ambassador of Bangladesh to Morocco
- In office March 2021 – October 2023
- Succeeded by: Mohammad Harun Al Rashid

Ambassador of Bangladesh to Belgium
- Incumbent
- Assumed office 18 April 2016
- Preceded by: Ismat Jahan

Ambassador of Bangladesh to Italy
- In office August 2012 – 31 May 2016
- Preceded by: Masud Bin Momen
- Succeeded by: Abdus Sobhan Sikder

Ambassador of Bangladesh to Qatar
- In office 24 December 2008 – 20 September 2012
- Preceded by: M. Maroof Zaman
- Succeeded by: Syed Masud Mahmood Khundoker

High Commissioner of Bangladesh to Sri Lanka
- In office 28 June 2006 – 17 December 2008
- Preceded by: A. M. Yakub Ali
- Succeeded by: Mahbub Uz Zaman

Personal details
- Education: University of Rajshahi

Md Shahdat Hossain is a Bangladeshi diplomat and former ambassador of Bangladesh to Morocco. He formerly served as the ambassador of Bangladesh to Italy, Qatar, Sri Lanka, and Belgium.

== Early life ==
Hossain completed his bachelors and masters in English Language at the University of Rajshahi.

== Career ==
Hossain joined the Bangladesh Civil Service in 1984 as a Foreign Affairs cadre. He had worked in the High Commission of Bangladesh, New Delhi, Bangladesh Embassy in Egypt and the High Commission of Bangladesh, Islamabad.

Hossain served as the High Commissioner of Bangladesh to Sri Lanka from 28 June 2006 to 17 December 2008. In 2009, he was appointed ambassador of Bangladesh to Qatar. He signed an agreement with Qatar to import liquefied natural gas to Bangladesh. He worked on the trip of Prime Minister Sheikh Hasina to Qatar to attend the US-Islamic World Forum and the 13th United Nations Conference on Trade and Development.

In August 2012, Hossain was appointed ambassador of Bangladesh to Italy while he was serving as the ambassador of Bangladesh to Qatar.

Hossain was appointed ambassador of Bangladesh to Belgium in 2016 replacing Ismat Jahan. Abdus Sobhan Sikder replaced him as the ambassador of Bangladesh to Italy.

In March 2021, Hossain was appointed ambassador of Bangladesh to Morocco. Mohammad Harun Al Rashid replaced him as the ambassador of Bangladesh to Morocco.
