= Masud Bin Momen =

Bangladesh diplomat

- মাসুদ বিন মোমেন
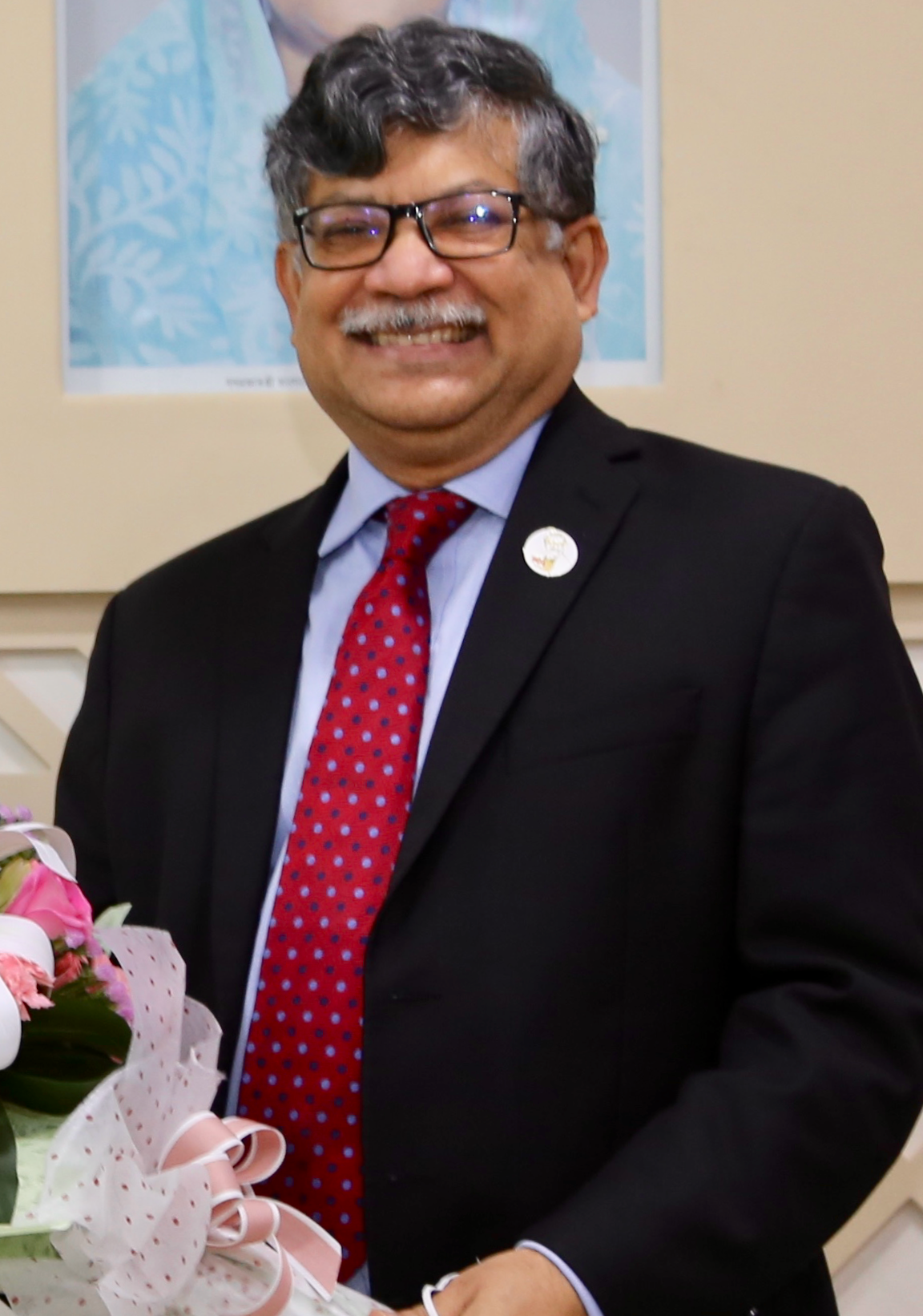
- Masud in 2020

Foreign Secretary of Bangladesh
- In office 31 December 2019 – 1 September 2024
- Preceded by: Shahidul Haque
- Succeeded by: Md. Jashim Uddin

Permanent Representative of Bangladesh to the United Nations
- In office 3 November 2015 – November 2019
- Preceded by: AK Abdul Momen
- Succeeded by: Rabab Fatima

Ambassador of Bangladesh to Japan
- In office 29 August 2012 – 19 November 2015
- Preceded by: A. K. M. Majibur Rahman Bhuiyan
- Succeeded by: Rabab Fatima

Ambassador of Bangladesh to Italy
- In office 17 August 2008 – 20 August 2012
- Preceded by: M. Fazlul Karim
- Succeeded by: Md Shahdat Hossain

Personal details
- Education: University of Dhaka; Fletcher School of Law and Diplomacy
- Profession: Civil Servant and diplomat

Masud Bin Momen is the former Foreign Secretary of Bangladesh. He is a career Bangladeshi diplomat. He served as an ambassador and permanent representative of Bangladesh to the United Nations. He also served as the ambassador to Japan and Italy.

== Education ==
Masud Bin Momen is from Sayedabad village of Kasba Upzilla of BrahmanBaria district. He obtained a bachelor's degree in economics from Dhaka University in Bangladesh. He holds MSS in Economics from the University of Dhaka and a master's degree in international relations from The Fletcher School of Law and Diplomacy in the United States.

== Career ==
Masud belongs to the 1985 batch of BCS (FA) cadre.

From 1998 to 2001, he was Director in charge of the Foreign Ministry's United Nations Wing and Foreign Secretary's Office in Dhaka.

Masud served as Director of Poverty Alleviation Department at SAARC Secretariat in Kathmandu, Nepal, from 2001 to 2004. After that he was Deputy High Commissioner at the Bangladesh High Commission in New Delhi, India, from 2004 to 2006.

From 2006 to 2008, he was Director-General for Bangladesh's Ministry of Foreign Affairs, responsible for matters related to South Asia, the South Asian Association for Regional Cooperation (SAARC), the Bay of Bengal Initiative for Multi-Sectoral Technical and Economic Cooperation.

Masud had been Bangladesh's Ambassador to Japan since August 2012. Before that, he had served since August 2008 as Bangladeshi Ambassador to Italy and Permanent Representative to the Food and Agriculture Organization (FAO), World Food Programme (WFP) and International Fund for Agricultural Development.

Besides those assignments, Masud served in Bangladesh Consulate General in New York and Bangladesh High Commission in Islamabad at different capacities.

On 3 November 2015 the government appointed Masud Bin Momen as the next Ambassador and Permanent Representative of Bangladesh to the United Nations.

The new Permanent Representative of Bangladesh to the United Nations, Masud Bin Momen, presented his credentials to UN Secretary-General Ban-ki Moon on 24 November 2015. On July 9 2016 he presented his credentials to the President of Guatemala Jimmy Morales on Friday at the Presidential Palace in Guatemala City as ambassador of Bangladesh to Guatemala.
