= Foreign Service Academy (Bangladesh) =

Government Agency of Bangladesh

- Formation: 1 January 1997
- Headquarters: Dhaka, Bangladesh
- Coordinates: 23.7402°N 90.4022°E
- Region served: Bangladesh
- Official language: Bengali
- Rector: Mashfee Binte Shams
- Website: mofa.portal.gov.bd

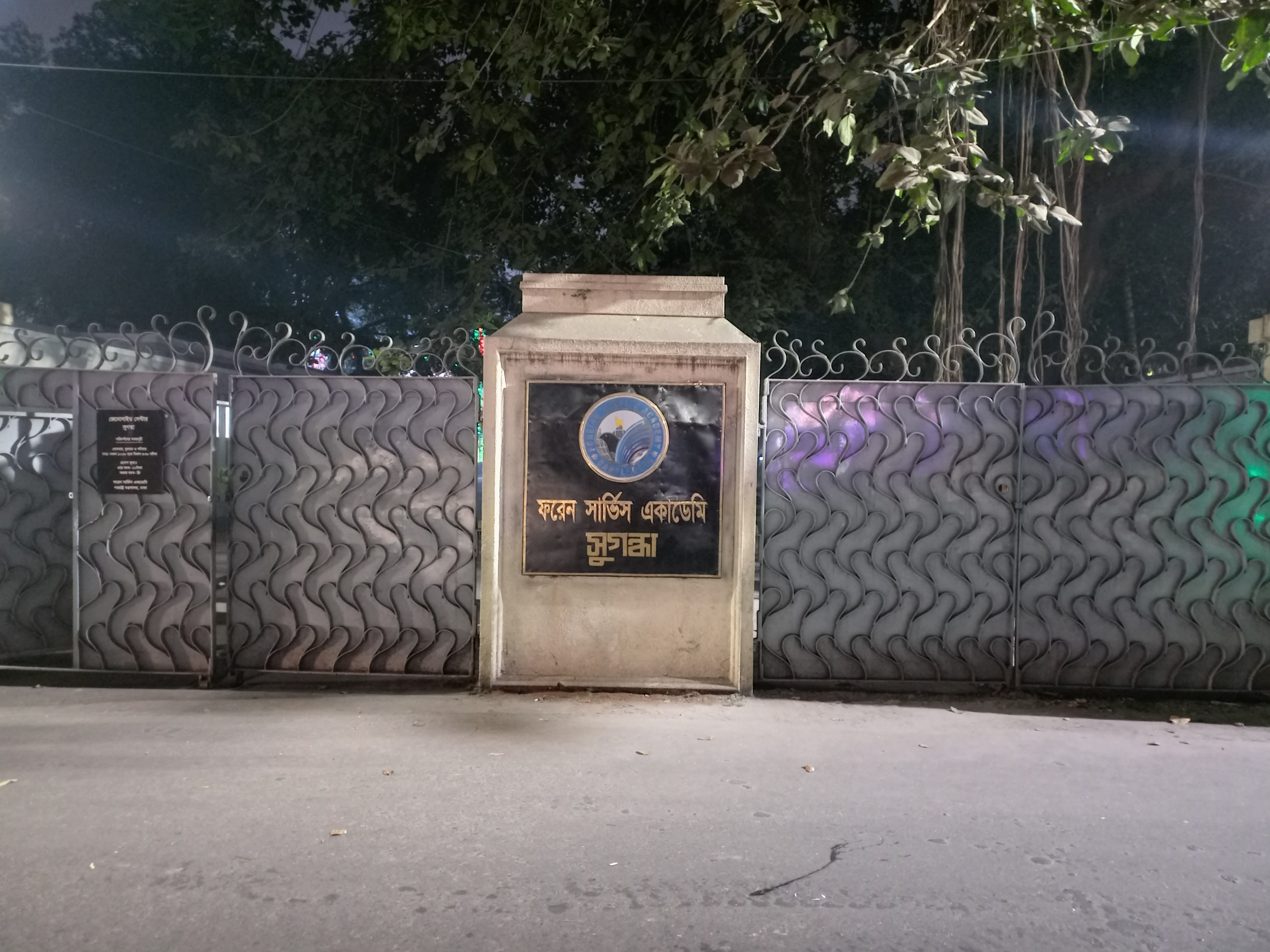
The gate of the Foreign Service Academy

Foreign Service Academy is a training academy for foreign service officers of the Bangladesh Civil Service under the Ministry of Foreign Affairs.

== History ==
In the 1980s, the foreign service officers were trained at the Foreign Affairs Training Institute which was later merged with the Bangladesh Civil Service Administration Academy. Foreign Service Academy was established in 1996 by the government of Bangladesh to train foreign service officers after a need for specialized training was recognized. The academy started working from 1 January 1997. On 19 April 2019, the Academy opened a Genocide corner in memory of the Bangladesh genocide during the Bangladesh Liberation war.

=== Headquarters ===
The academy was decided to be located at a historic colonial era mansion known as the President's House. In the 1960s, Queen Elizabeth II stayed at the mansion. After the independence of Bangladesh, the mansion was called the Ganabhaban ("People's House") and made the office of then-Prime Minister Sheikh Mujib but after the building of a new Ganabhaban in Sher-e-Bangla Nagar it was converted to a state guest house named Sugandha. In 1996, it became the official headquarters of the Foreign Service Academy.

== Principals and rectors ==
Until October 2015, the academy was led by a principal, after that by a rector.

SL No.	Name	Position	Term start	Term end	Reference
01	Ambassador M. N. I. Chaudhury	Principal (Foreign Affairs Training Institute)	1981	1983	
02	Ambassador M. R. Osmany	Principal (Foreign Affairs Training Institute)	1983	1984	
03	Ambassador AKM Jalaluddin	Principal (Foreign Affairs Training Institute)	1984	1985	
04	Ambassador Humayun Kabir	Principal (Foreign Service Academy)	1985	1988	
05	Ambassador M. Anwar Hashim	Principal (Foreign Service Academy)	Dec. 1996	Jan. 1999	
06	Md. Touhid Hossain	Principal (Foreign Service Academy)	Jan. 1999	Feb. 2000	
07	Ambassador Mohiuddin Ahmed	Principal (Foreign Service Academy)	Feb. 2000	Jan. 2001	
08	Ambassador Syed Muazzem Ali	Principal (Foreign Service Academy)	Jul. 2001	Dec. 2001	
09	Ambassador Jamil Majid	Principal (Foreign Service Academy)	Jun. 2002	Nov. 2006	
10	Ambassador Dr. Md. Saiful Amin Khan	Principal (Foreign Service Academy)	Mar. 2007	Aug. 2007	
11	Ambassador Shahed Akhter, ndc	Principal (Foreign Service Academy)	Feb. 2008	May 2009	
12	Md. Touhid Hossain	Principal (Foreign Service Academy)	Jul. 2009	Jul. 2012	
13	Ambassador Mustafa Kamal	Principal (Foreign Service Academy)	Aug. 2012	Jan. 2015	
14	Md. Shahidul Haque	Principal (Foreign Service Academy)	Jan. 2015	Oct. 2015	
15	Ambassador Syed Masud Mahmood Khundoker	Principal (Foreign Service Academy)	Oct. 2015	Aug. 2019	
16	Ambassador Syed Masud Mahmood Khundoker	Rector	Aug. 2019	Mar. 2021	
17	Ambassador Shabbir Ahmad Chowdhury, ndc	Rector	Mar. 2021	Oct. 2021	
18	Ambassador Asad Alam Siam	Rector	Nov. 2021	Jan. 2023	
19	Ambassador Mashfee Binte Shams	Rector	Jan. 2023	Present	
