= AKM Morshed =

Bangladeshi politician

Member of Bangladesh Parliament
- In office 1979–1986

Personal details
- Political party: Bangladesh Nationalist Party

AKM Morshed (Bengali: এ কে এম মোরশেদ) is a Bangladesh Nationalist Party politician and a former member of parliament for Rajshahi-8.

== Career ==
Morshed was elected to parliament from Rajshahi-8 as a Bangladesh Nationalist Party candidate in 1979.
