= AKM Jalaluddin =

Bangladeshi diplomat (?-2014)

- এ কে এম জালালউদ্দিন

Ambassador of Bangladesh to Nepal
- In office 17 August 1987 – 19 May 1989
- Preceded by: Abdul Bari
- Succeeded by: Syed Muhammad Hussain

Personal details
- Born: 1942/1943 Faridpur, Bengal Presidency, British India
- Died: 19 August 2014 (aged 71) Mohammadpur, Dhaka, Bangladesh
- Education: University of Dhaka; Australian National University
- Occupation: Civil servant, diplomat, academic

AKM Jalaluddin (1942/1943 – 19 August 2014) was a Bangladeshi civil servant, diplomat, and academic. He was the Ambassador of Bangladesh to Nepal and the Principal of the Foreign Service Academy. He battled Parkinson’s disease for over three decades until his death.

== Early life and education ==
Jalaluddin was born in Faridpur, where he attended Faridpur Zilla School. In the 1958 Matriculation Examination under the Dacca Board, he secured seventh place. He later ranked first in the Intermediate examination. At the University of Dhaka, he initially studied economics but later switched to international relations, earning his master's degree with first-class first honours and record marks. A resident of Salimullah Muslim Hall, he was elected Assistant General Secretary of the hall’s student union. He was also awarded the Chancellor's gold medal for his essay *Responsibility of Leadership*.

== Career ==
Before entering government service, Jalaluddin worked as a journalist. He was a correspondent for the now-defunct Morning News. He was a founding member of the Dhaka University Journalists' Association. He later served as a lecturer in the Department of International Relations at the University of Dhaka.

In 1965, he passed the Central Superior Services examination, placing first among Bengali candidates and second overall. He joined the civil service in 1966, training at the Civil Service Academy in Lahore alongside a cohort that included future high-ranking officials such as Mohammad Farashuddin, AHM Mofazzal Karim, and ATM Shamsul Huda.

Jalaluddin served as Sub-Divisional Officer in Chandpur and Vehari, and as Additional Deputy Commissioner in Multan. As Deputy Commissioner in Mymensingh, he played a key role in establishing the Zainul Abedin Art Gallery on the banks of the Brahmaputra. He was later appointed Governor of Rangpur District under a new administrative framework of BAKSAL.

After the events of 1975, Jalaluddin transitioned to the Ministry of Local Government and pursued doctoral studies at the Department of Demography at the Australian National University. It was during this period that he first showed symptoms of Parkinson’s disease.

After returning from Australia, Jalaluddin rejoined the Ministry of Foreign Affairs. He served in various diplomatic roles, including postings in Paris and as principal of the Foreign Service Academy. He was the principal of the academy from 1984 to 1985. He was the minister at the Embassy of Bangladesh in Paris. He served as the Ambassador of Bangladesh to Nepal from 17 August 1987 to 19 May 1989. Toward the end of his career, he also served in the Ministry of Industries as an additional secretary, and the Prime Minister's Office.

== Illness and death ==
Despite his illness, Jalaluddin remained intellectually active, collecting research on Parkinson’s disease and jokingly referring to it as his second PhD. He died on 19 August 2014 in Mohammadpur, Dhaka, Bangladesh. He was buried at the Mirpur Martyred Intellectuals' Graveyard.
