= A. K. M. Mahmood =

Bangladeshi cricketer (born 1975)

Personal information
- Full name: A. K. M. Mahmood
- Born: 1 September 1975 (age 51); Sylhet, Sylhet Division, Bangladesh
- Role: Wicket-keeper

Domestic team information
- Years: Team
- 2001/02–2002/03: Sylhet Division

Career statistics
Competition	FC	List A
Matches	10	12
Runs scored	109	43
Batting average	8.38	14.33
100s/50s	–/–	–/–
Top score	21	20*
Balls bowled	3	–
Wickets	–	–
Bowling average	–	–
5 wickets in innings	–	–
10 wickets in match	–	–
Best bowling	–	–
Catches/stumpings	17/-	20/-
- Source: CricketArchive, 17 January 2011

A. K. M. Mahmood (born 1 September 1975) is a first-class and List A cricketer from Bangladesh. He was born in Sylhet, Chittagong and is sometimes known by his nickname Imon. A specialist wicket keeper, he had little success with the bat when he played for Sylhet Division between 2000 and 2003 but took 37 catches in all forms of the game.
