= July Mass Uprising Memorial Museum =

Former residence of the Sheikh Hasina

July Uprising Memorial Museum জুলাই গণঅভ্যুত্থান স্মৃতি জাদুঘর
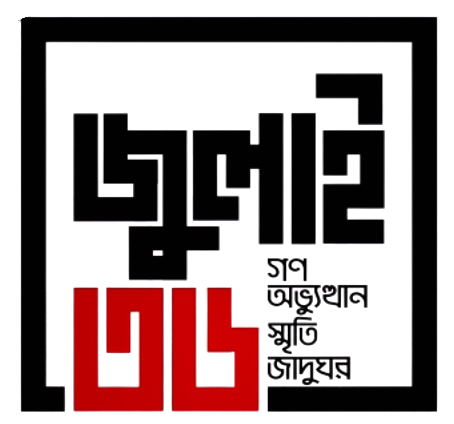
- Building details
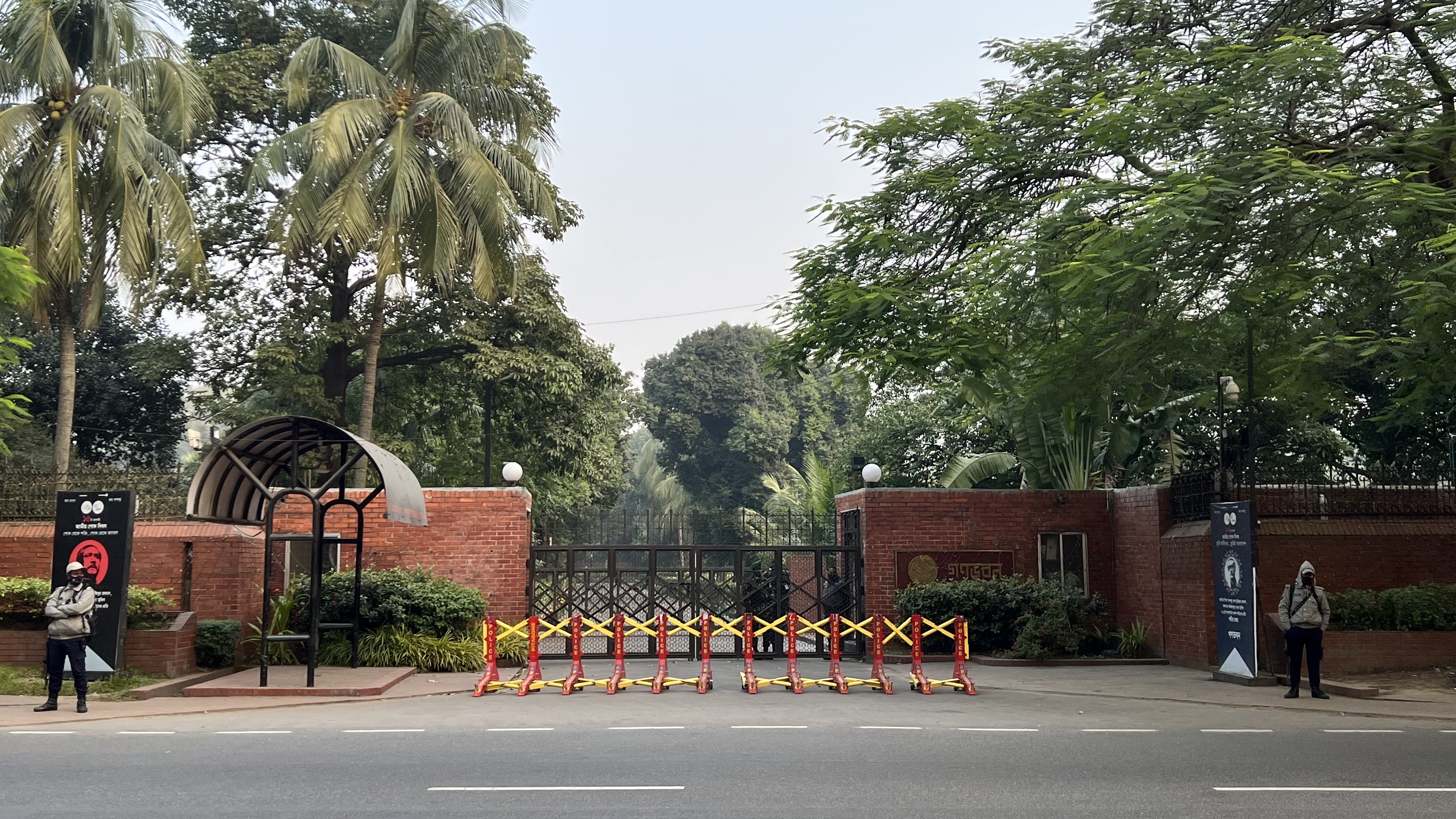
- Entrance of the site in 2021, when it was Ganabhaban

General information
- Location: Sher-e-Bangla Nagar, Dhaka, Bangladesh
- Construction started: 1973
- Completed: 1974
- Cost: ৳2.39 billion
- Client: Government of Bangladesh
- Owner: Government of Bangladesh
- Operator: City PWD Division, Dhaka

Technical details
- Floor area: 3600 sq ft

Design and construction
- Architect: Amir Hossain

Website
- july36.gov.bd

The July Mass Uprising Memorial Museum (Bengali: জুলাই গণঅভ্যুত্থান স্মৃতি জাদুঘর) formerly known as Ganabhaban (Bengali: গণভবন, lit. 'People's House', also spelt Gonobhaban) is a museum in Bangladesh preserving the history of the July Uprising in 2024. It is located in Sher-e-Bangla Nagar, Dhaka, north of the National Parliament House. The site previously served as the official residence of the Prime Minister Sheikh Hasina until the fall of her government. It was transformed into a museum on 5 August 2026.

== History ==
Sheikh Mujibur Rahman, after switching from presidency to premiership following the independence of Bangladesh and founding of a parliamentary government, used to have his office at what was known as the "President's House" (later more commonly "Sugandha Bhaban" and officially "State Guest House Sugandha"), which he referred to as the "Ganabhaban", meaning "People's House", and now serves as the Foreign Service Academy office since 1996, located on Baily Road. Due to inadequate office space, following the 1973 general election, he had the Ganabhaban built at Sher-e-Bangla Nagar as his official residence and secretariat, though he never resided there. After its completion the following year, he would work there until 1975 and it would subsequently be used as a court-martial by the succeeding martial law administrations.

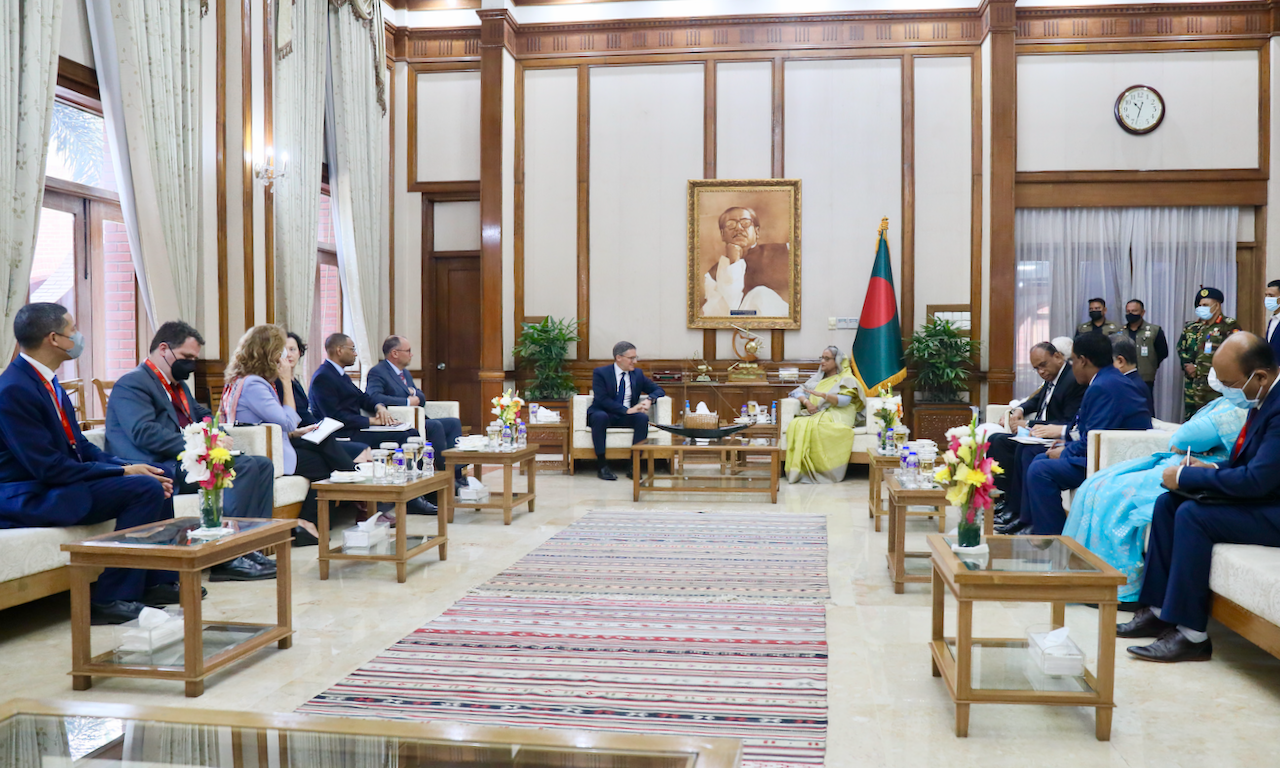
A view from inside the Ganabhaban during an official meeting in 2023

After 6 April 1979, the building remained abandoned until 1985 when Chief Martial Law Administrator Hussain Muhammad Ershad, on the occasion of the first SAARC summit, undertook the initiative to renovate it for the first time. Following the completion of renovation work, it was rechristened to "State Guest House Karatoa" in 1986. During his Bangladesh tour, Indian prime minister Rajiv Gandhi stayed at the place.

Right before the end of her first tenure as prime minister from 1996 to 2001, Sheikh Hasina, Mujib's daughter, leased the Ganabhaban for just one taka during a regular cabinet meeting presided by her. Such a move offended the people and came under much criticism at the time from both national and international media. Reluctant to tolerate such criticism, PM Hasina left the building with her sister, likely planning to complete rest of the formalities in her next premiership after the election. However, she would not come to power again until 2009 and the lease would get canceled by the caretaker government of Latifur Rahman.

On 13 October 2009, a law, passed by the parliament as part of an act to provide state security to Mujib's family members, assigned the Ganabhaban to Hasina. The law was repealed, following Hasina's overthrow on 5 August 2024, by the Interim government of Muhammad Yunus on 29 August 2025, describing it as discriminatory.

Sheikh Hasina moved into the Ganabhaban on 6 March 2010, more than a year after she had been elected. Before that, she had to move from her late husband's house "Sudha Sadan" to Jamuna State Guest House in February of the same year on the advice of intelligence agencies and the Special Security Force, and stayed there while the Ganabhaban was being renovated. She hosted the wedding of three women who were victims of the 2010 Dhaka fire in Nimtoli at the Ganabhaban. U Pha Thann, Ambassador of Myanmar to Bangladesh, visited Hasina and discussed the Rohingya refugees in Bangladesh.

In October 2013, Hasina invited another former prime minister Khaleda Zia to the Ganabhaban to discuss the 2014 national elections.

A constable of the Special Security and Protection Battalion, guarding the Ganabhaban, was shot accidentally by a colleague in February 2018.

Politicians of the Awami League affiliated bodies have special passes to access the Ganabhaban. In September 2019, the special passes of the president and general secretary of Bangladesh Chhatra League were suspended. Bangladesh police stopped victims of 2012 Dhaka garment factory fire from reaching the Ganabhaban in November 2020. In April 2022, Sohel Taj announced plans to march to the Ganabhaban. Of all the governments or heads of state in Bangladesh, only former Prime Minister Sheikh Hasina has lived in Ganabhaban.

=== After 5 August 2024 ===
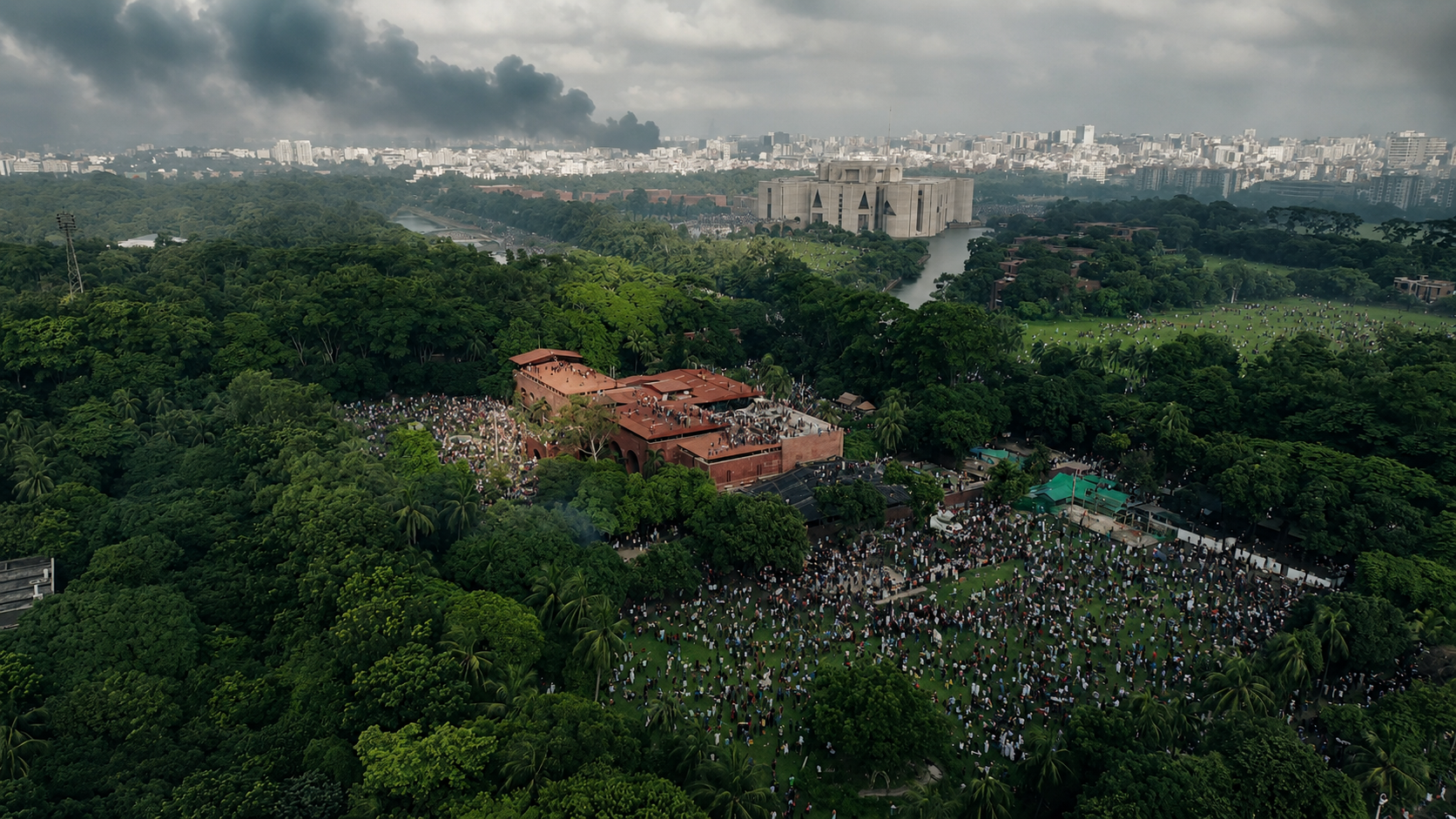
Ganabhaban and Jatiya Sangsad of the People's Republic of Bangladesh on August 05, 2024

During the July Uprising in 2024, the Ganabhaban was stormed and looted by protesters following the Resignation of Sheikh Hasina. Various items, including cash, sarees, jewelry, furniture, and even animals such as fish, ducks, and rabbits, were taken from the premises. Some protesters also consumed the food prepared in the kitchen. However, later that day, students organized themselves to halt the looting, forming a human chain to protect the building and successfully recovering approximately 80% of the stolen items. Many individuals returned looted items and animals to the military, who were stationed at the site in the days that followed.

On 5 September, the interim government announced plans to convert Ganabhaban into a memorial museum, named the July Uprising Memorial Museum, preserving its post-storming condition as a historical exhibit. It was inaugurated as a museum on 5 August 2026 by prime minister Tarique Rahman in presence of former Chief Advisor Muhammad Yunus.

== Other past functions ==
Beside residing there, Sheikh Hasina used to exchange Eid al-Fitr and Eid al-Adha greetings with people including party leaders, professionals, senior civil and military officials, judges and diplomats at the place. On the day of the two Eids, the gate used to be opened to all visitors at nine in the morning, when people from all walks of life used to wait in queue to meet her after the special prayers. The custom was in place during Ershad's presidency also.

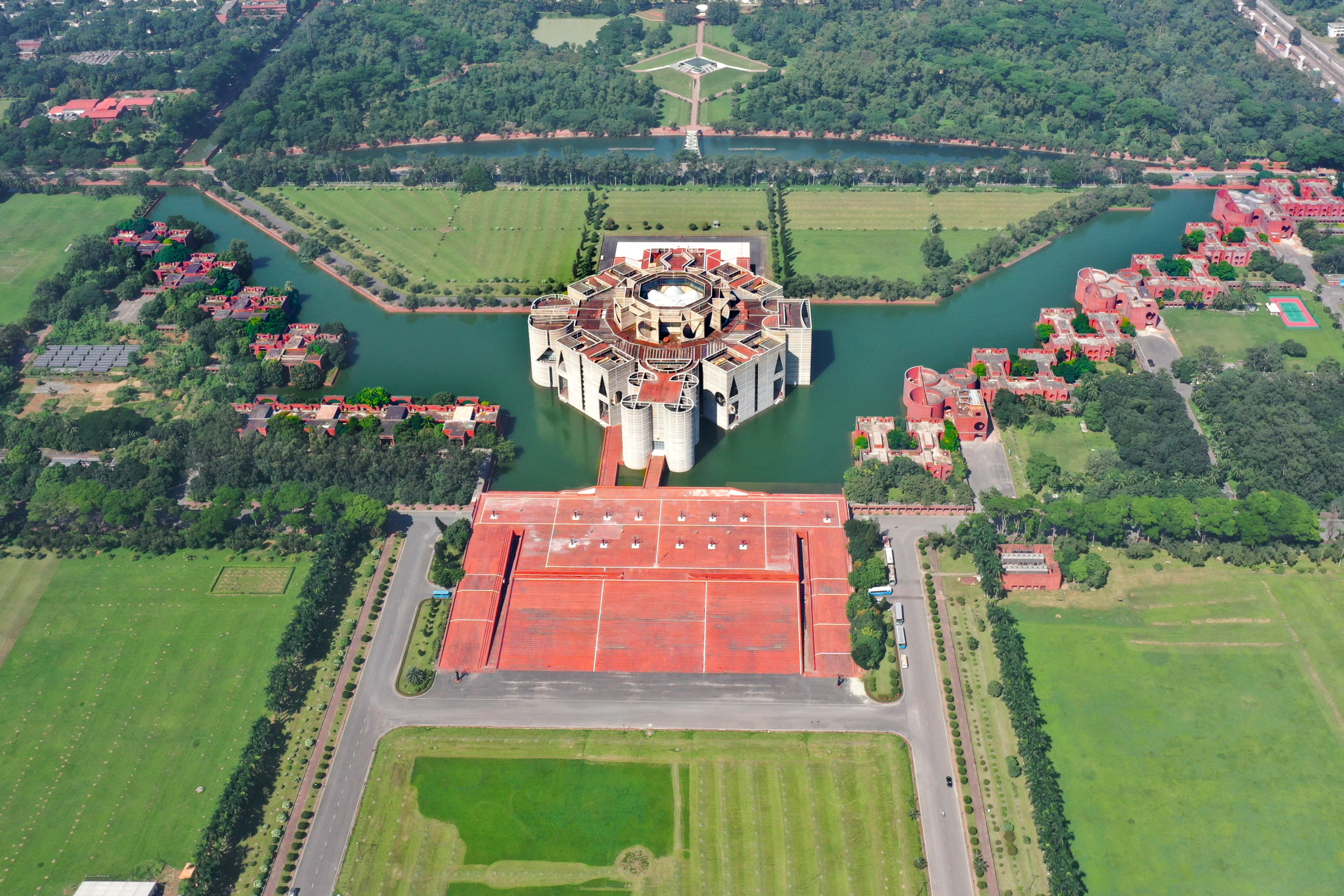
View of the National Parliament House. Ganabhaban is located in the top left corner.

== Location ==
It is on the northwest corner of the Mirpur Road and Lake Road crossing and a five-minute walk from the National Parliament House. The area is one of the highest security zones of Dhaka. The Prime Minister's Office is a little way off.
