= A. K. M. Majibur Rahman Bhuiyan =

- এ কে এম মজিবুর রহমান ভূঁইয়া

Ambassador of Bangladesh to Iran
- In office December 2015 – 2019

Ambassador of Bangladesh to Japan
- In office 13 August 2010 – 13 July 2011
- Preceded by: Ashraf-ud-Doula
- Succeeded by: Masud Bin Momen

Ambassador of Bangladesh to Bhutan
- In office 1 November 2009 – 11 August 2010
- Preceded by: A.K.M. Atiqur Rahman
- Succeeded by: Imtiaz Ahmed

A. K. M. Majibur Rahman Bhuiyan is a Bangladeshi diplomat who served as the ambassador of Bangladesh to Iran and Japan. He was the ambassador of Bangladesh to Bhutan.

== Career ==
Bhuiyan joined the Bangladesh Foreign Service cadre of the Bangladesh Civil Service in 1986. He was a councilor of the Bangladesh Embassy in Tokyo.

Bhuiyan served as the ambassador of Bangladesh to Bhutan from 1 November 2009 to 11 August 2010. He hosted Prime Minister Sheikh Hasina when she visited Bhutan.

Bhuiyan was appointed ambassador of Bangladesh to Japan on 13 August 2010 replacing Ashraf-ud-Doula. He sought help from Japan for building the Padma Bridge. He hosted Prime Minister Sheikh Hasina when she visited Japan and met Emperor Akihito.

Bhuiyan was recalled from Japan in June 2011 for harassing a female Japanese employee of the embassy. The ambassador of Bangladesh to South Korea visited Japan to investigate the allegations and found them to be true. He was replaced by Masud Bin Momen.

In December 2015, Bhuiyan was appointed ambassador of Bangladesh to Iran. He was serving as a director general of the Ministry of Foreign Affairs. He was concurrently accredited to Turkmenistan. He was recalled from Iran in 2019 over "moral lapses". The Ambassador of Bangladesh to Germany Imtiaz Ahmed investigated the claims against Bhuiyan and found them to be true. He was recalled as the same time as the Ambassador of Bangladesh to Lebanon Abdul Motaleb Sarker.
