= AKM Ziauddin =

Bangladeshi politician

Member of Bangladesh Parliament
- In office 1979–1986

Personal details
- Party: Bangladesh Nationalist Party

AKM Ziauddin (Bengali: এ কে এম জিয়াউদ্দিন) is a Bangladesh Nationalist Party politician and a former member of parliament for Khulna-8.

== Career ==
Ziauddin was elected to parliament from Khulna-8 as a Bangladesh Nationalist Party candidate in 1979 in a by-election. The by-election were called after Abdus Sabur Khan, who was elected from two constituencies, resigned and choose to represent Khulna-6.
