= AKM Fazlul Haque =

AKM Fazlul Haque may refer to:

- AKM Fazlul Haque (Bangladesh Nationalist Party politician) (fl. 1991), former member of Parliament for Mymensingh-4
- AKM Fazlul Haque (Jatiya Party politician) (fl. 1988–1990), former member of Parliament for Naogaon-1
- AKM Fazlul Haque Milon (fl. 2001–2006), Bangladeshi politician
- A. K. M. Fazlul Haque (born 1949), Bangladeshi politician
- A. K. M. Fazlul Haque (surgeon) (born 1958), Bangladeshi surgeon

== See also ==
- Fazlul Haq or Fazlul Haque, a male Muslim given name
- Sheikh Fazlul Haque Mani (1939–1975), Bangladeshi politician
