= A. K. M. Zahirul Huq =

Bangladeshi judge

Justice of the High Court Division of Bangladesh

Personal details
- Born: 15 February 1971 (age 55)
- Profession: Judge

A. K. M. Zahirul Huq is a Justice of the High Court Division of the Bangladesh Supreme Court.

== Early life ==
Zahirul Huq was born on 15 February 1971. He did his undergraduate and graduate degree in law from the University of Dhaka.

== Career ==
Zahirul Huq became a lawyer of the District Courts on 10 October 1995 and the High Court Division on 10 July 1999.

Zahirul Huq became a lawyer of the Appellate Division on 29 March 2018. He was appointed an additional judge of the High Court Division on 21 October 2019. In November 2019, Zahirul Huq and Justice Obaidul Hassan upheld a lower court verdict ordering the seizure of Hong Kong bank accounts of M Morshed Khan, former Minister of Foreign Affairs, and his son. Khan was represented by Sheikh Fazle Noor Taposh and Ajmalul Hossain.

In January 2020, Zahirul Huq and Justice Obaidul Hassan granted bail to Matiur Rahman, editor of Prothom Alo, in a case filed over the death of a Dhaka Residential Model College student who died of accidental electrocution at a program of the newspaper. The bench also ordered the government to not harass Matiur Rahman. Zahirul Huq and Justice Obaidul Hassan granted bail to former Awami League member of parliament, AKMA Awal, and his wife in a corruption case. In February 2020, Huq and Justice Obaidul Hassan stopped the corruption case against Abdul Latif Siddique, former Minister of Textiles and Jute, in a corruption case filed by the Anti-Corruption Commission. In September, Zahirul Huq and Justice Obaidul Hassan ordered Aslamul Haque, member of parliament, to stop the construction of his Arisha Economic Zone over allegations that it was encroaching on Turag River. In December 2020, Zahirul Huq and Justice Md Moinul Islam Chowdhury passed a verdict in favor of the Anti-Corruption Commission investigating Deputy Attorney General Jannatul Ferdousi Rupa on corruption allegations.

In November 2021, Zahirul Huq and Justice Md Nazrul Islam Talukder denied bail to actor and producer Nazrul Islam Raz on 180 million BDT money laundering case.

In January 2022, Zahirul Huq and Justice Md Nazrul Islam Talukder granted bail to the owner of Lakehead Grammar School, Md Khaled Hassan Matin, on allegations of laundering 33 million BDT. Zahirul Huq and Justice Md Nazrul Islam Talukder granted bail to Tufan Sarkar, leader of Bangladesh Sramik League, in a 3.3 million BDT money laundering case.

In July 2023, Zahirul Huq and Justice Sheikh Md Zakir Hossain asked lawyers not to refer to them as lords but instead use sir or your honor.
