= Shabbir Ahmad Chowdhury =

Bangladeshi diplomat

- সাব্বির আহমেদ চৌধুরী

High Commissioner of Bangladesh to South Africa

High Commissioner of Bangladesh to Mauritius
- In office September 2012 – March 2015
- Preceded by: Position created
- Succeeded by: Md. Abdul Mannan Howlader

Personal details
- Education: Bangladesh University of Engineering and Technology
- Occupation: Diplomat

Shabbir Ahmad Chowdhury is a former ambassador and former Secretary of the Ministry of Foreign Affairs. He was the first High Commissioner of Bangladesh to the Seychelles. He was the High Commissioner of Bangladesh to South Africa. In March 2025, he was appointed as a Member of the Bangladesh Public Service Commission.

== Early life and education ==
Chowdhury completed his undergraduate studies in Electrical and Electronic Engineering at the Bangladesh University of Engineering and Technology. From 1988 to 1990, he served as a lecturer at the Bangladesh Institute of Technology, Rajshahi. He received professional training at the International Institute of Public Administration in Paris, France, and at the Korean International Cooperation Agency. In 2007, he completed the National Defence Course at the National Defence College.

== Career ==
Chowdhury joined the Bangladesh Foreign Affairs Cadre in January 1991 after placing second in the combined merit list of the 9th Bangladesh Civil Service examination. Throughout his diplomatic career, he held a wide range of positions both domestically and internationally.

Chowdhury served as the Deputy Permanent Representative at the Permanent Mission of Bangladesh to the United Nations in New York. He also served as the Consul General of Bangladesh in New York and Minister at the Bangladesh High Commission in London. He held ambassadorial-level assignments as the High Commissioner of Bangladesh to Mauritius. In 2014, he was appointed the first High Commissioner of Bangladesh to the Seychelles. In 2015, he was appointed the High Commissioner of Bangladesh to South Africa.

Between March and October 2021, Chowdhury was appointed as the Rector of the Foreign Service Academy. He was posted to Bangladesh Missions in Beijing and Brussels and held various roles within the Ministry of Foreign Affairs in Dhaka, including Director General. He later served as Secretary (West) of the Ministry of Foreign Affairs until his retirement on 2 April 2023. As the acting foreign secretary of Bangladesh, he organised an event marking the historic 7 March Speech of Sheikh Mujibur Rahman at the Foreign Service Academy in 2023. He attended a meeting with Derek Chollet, US State Department Counsellor, in which AK Abdul Momen, Minister of Foreign Affairs, sought support for developing the Rapid Action Battalion.

Following his retirement from the foreign service, Chowdhury was appointed a Member of the Bangladesh Public Service Commission on 2 March 2025.

== Personal life ==
Shabbir Ahmad Chowdhury is married to Abeda Ahmad Chowdhury. The couple has two sons.
