= AKM Nazir Ahmed =

Muslim scholar and politician

- এ.কে.এম. নাজির আহমদ
- Born: 1939; Boalia village, Comilla District, Bengal Presidency, British India
- Died: January 7, 2014 (aged 74–75); Dhaka, Bangladesh
- Education: University of Dhaka

A. K. M. Nazir Ahmad (c. 1939 – January 7, 2014) was an Islamist politician in Pakistan and later Bangladesh. At the time of his death, he was Nayeb-e-Ameer of the far-right Bangladesh Jamaat-e-Islami.

== Early life and education ==
Ahmad was born in 1939 in the village of Boalia, Bengal Presidency, British India (now in Borura Upazila of the Comilla District in Bangladesh). After completing his primary and secondary education, he obtained Bachelor of Arts (Hons) in English from Dhaka University in 1962. A year later in 1963, he obtained an M. A. from the same university.

== Politics ==
He was actively involved in student politics since 1960 and was the Central President of East Pakistan Islami Chhatra Sangha. After finishing his studies, he joined Jamaat-e-Islami in 1965. Within a short time, he was appointed the Ameer of Comilla division in 1967. Throughout his political tenure, he served as member of Majlis-e-Shura, Central Working Committee and executive committee.

In 2009, he was appointed Nayeb-e-Ameer of Bangladesh Jamaat-e-Islami, a post he held till his death.

== Arrest ==
On 11 December 2011, Ahmad, along with 6 other leaders of Bangladesh Jamaat-e-Islami, was sent to jail in connection with two cases filed for damaging vehicles, assaulting police and obstructing them from discharging their duties on 19 September 2011 at Bijoynagar in the capital city.

== Death ==
Ahmed died in Ibn Sina hospital in Dhaka on the night of 7 January 2014 following a severe heart attack and hospitalization under life support for more than 10 days. Relatives said that his deteriorating health had been a result of a heart attack following news that his son had been arrested by police. He was 74 years old. Condolence messages were issued by Bangladesh Jamaat-e-Islami Acting Ameer Maqbul Ahmed and Acting Sec-Gen Shafiqur Rahman, Ameer of Jamaat-e-Islami Hind Maulana Syed Jalaluddin Omari among others.
