= Mashfee Binte Shams =

Bangladeshi diplomat

Rector of the Bangladesh Foreign Service Academy
- In office January 2023 – January 2025
- Preceded by: Asad Alam Siam

Secretary (East) of the Ministry of Foreign Affairs
- In office December 2020 – December 2022

Ambassador of Bangladesh to Nepal
- In office 30 May 2013 – 20 August 2020
- Preceded by: Neem Chandra Bhowmik
- Succeeded by: Salahuddin Noman Chowdhury

Personal details
- Spouse: Minhas Rahman
- Children: 1 (Tanmoy Masroor Rahman)
- Education: Bangladesh University of Engineering and Technology (B.Arch); University of Leeds (MA)
- Occupation: Diplomat
- Website: mashfeesjourney.com

Mashfee Binte Shams is a Bangladeshi career diplomat and the former Rector of the Bangladesh Foreign Service Academy. She is the former Ambassador of Bangladesh to Nepal and previously served as the Secretary (East) of the Ministry of Foreign Affairs. She made history as the first female officer to reach the rank of Secretary within the ministry.

== Early life and education ==
Shams graduated from the Bangladesh University of Engineering and Technology (BUET) with a Bachelor of Architecture degree in 1988. She later obtained a Master of Arts in International Relations from the University of Leeds, UK, in 1994. Additionally, she completed professional short courses, including one conducted by the National University of Singapore in 2003.

== Career ==
Shams joined the Bangladesh Civil Service (Foreign Affairs) cadre 9th batch on 26 January 1991. In her 34-year diplomatic career, she served in various capacities at the Headquarters of the Ministry of Foreign Affairs in Dhaka and across different missions abroad.

Within the Ministry, Shams worked across the International Organisations, Budget & Expenditure Control, Africa, East Asia & Pacific, SAARC, and South Asia wings, serving as both Director and Director General. Overseas, she served in Rome as Second/First Secretary, and in Bangkok (concurrently accredited to Cambodia) as First Secretary, Counsellor, and Deputy Permanent Representative to UNESCAP. She also served in the Bangladesh High Commission in New Delhi as Counsellor, Minister, and Deputy High Commissioner.

=== Ambassador to Nepal (2013–2020) ===
In June 2013, Shams was appointed the Ambassador of Bangladesh to Nepal, serving for a seven-year tenure until 2020. Due to her extensive experience working in the South Asia region—including stints as Director (South Asia) from 2002 to 2004 and Director General (South Asia) from 2010 to 2013—she became highly involved in managing complex regional issues.

During her tenure in Nepal, she was heavily engaged in bilateral negotiations and verifications for the land boundary demarcation between Bangladesh and India, which culminated in the 2015 Land Boundary Agreement. She also contributed to cross-border water resource management, energy cooperation, and trade. Shams institutionalized the BBIN (Bangladesh-Bhutan-India-Nepal) sub-regional cooperation platform with the support of the Asian Development Bank.

Following the devastating April 2015 Nepal earthquake and the US-Bangla Airlines Flight 211 crash in Kathmandu in March 2018, Shams spearheaded humanitarian diplomacy and crisis media management. She also coordinated bilateral efforts for regional logistics, including air connectivity between Syedpur and Biratnagar, and a direct bus service linking Dhaka and Kathmandu.

=== Senior Leadership and Academy Rector ===
Shams served as the Additional Foreign Secretary (East) from August to December 2020, before stepping into the role of Secretary (East) from December 2020 until December 2022. In this capacity, she oversaw five geographic regions (East Asia and Pacific, South East Asia, South Asia, West Asia, and Africa) to advance Bangladesh's "Look East" and "Focus Africa" diplomatic policies. She represented Bangladesh at high-level regional summits for both SAARC and BIMSTEC.

Following her retirement from active service in December 2022, she was appointed Rector of the Foreign Service Academy in January 2023. As Rector, she modernized the curriculum by introducing modules in public diplomacy, communication skills, and professional well-being, while introducing specialized training courses for other government departments until her term ended in January 2025. She officially concluded her Pre-Retirement Leave (PRL) in January 2026.

== Advocacy and Personal Life ==
Shams is a vocal advocate for women's empowerment in public service, having initiated mentorship programs for junior female diplomats and flexible policies for officers returning from maternity leave.

She is married to architect Minhas Rahman. The couple has a son, Tanmoy Masroor Rahman, a concert pianist and musicologist. Shams maintains a personal blog documenting her experiences.
