= Md. Saiful Amin Khan =

Bangladeshi former diplomat and ambassador

Md. Saiful Amin Khan is a former diplomat and ambassador of Bangladesh. He was the deputy high commissioner of Bangladesh to the United Kingdom. He was Bangladesh's ambassador to Spain.

== Career ==
Khan was appointed Assistant High Commissioner of Bangladesh to the United Kingdom in Manchester on 15 August 1994, succeeding Ahmed Rahim. He served until 31 October 1997 and was succeeded by Esrazul Alam.

Khan served as the Principal of the Foreign Service Academy from March 2007 to August 2007. On 10 August 2007, Khan was appointed Bangladesh's Ambassador to Spain, succeeding Anwar Ul-Alam. He served as the ambassador until 23 May 2010, when Chowdhury Ifteker Momin replaced him.

Khan is a member of the Bangladesh Economic Association.
