= Shahidul Haque =

25th Foreign Secretary of Bangladesh

- শহীদুল হক
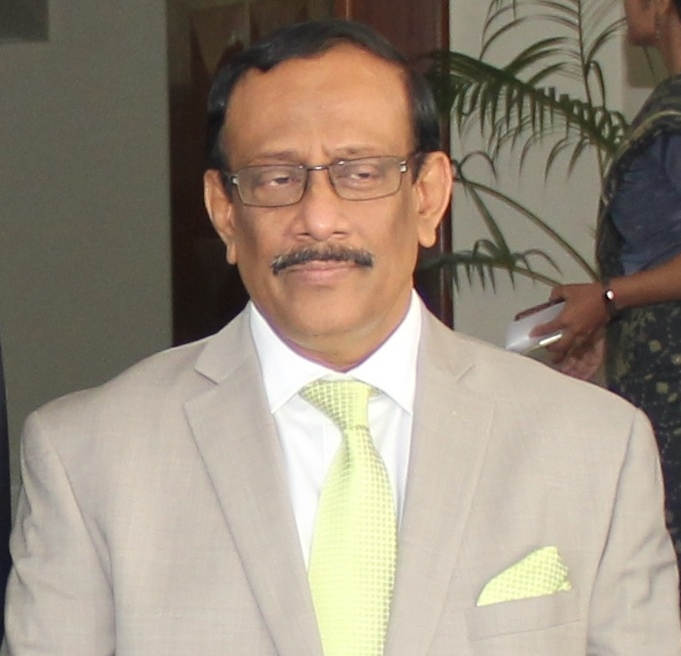

Foreign Secretary of Bangladesh
- In office 10 January 2013 – 31 December 2019
- President: Abdul Hamid
- Prime Minister: Sheikh Hasina
- Preceded by: Mohamed Mijarul Quayes
- Succeeded by: Masud Bin Momen

Personal details
- Born: 31 December 1959 (age 66) Quetta, Pakistan
- Education: Dhaka University; Fletcher School of Law and Diplomacy
- Profession: Government official

Shahidul Haque (born 31 December 1959) is a Bangladeshi government official and career diplomat who is the 25th and the longest serving foreign secretary of Bangladesh. He is a policy advisor of the International Organisation for Migration.

== Early life ==
Shahidul Haque was born on 31 December 1959 in Quetta, Pakistan. He graduated and obtained his post graduation degree in social welfare from the University of Dhaka. He also obtained a master's degree in international relations from the Fletcher School of Law and Diplomacy in 1988.

== Career ==
Shahidul Haque joined the Bangladesh Foreign Service in 1986.

From 1988 to 1995, Shahidul Haque was the assistant secretary at the South Asia desk at the Foreign Ministry of Bangladesh.

Shahidul Haque served at the Bangladesh High Commission from 1990 to 1994.

From 2001 to 2011, Shahidul Haque went on leave and worked at the International Organisation for Migration. On his return to the ministry, Shahidul Haque was made the director general.

On 10 January 2013, Shahidul Haque was appointed the interim foreign secretary of Bangladesh. He was promoted and made the full secretary on 18 July 2013.

Shahidul Haque was promoted to senior secretary on 19 July 2018. His tenure was increased by one year in September.

On 31 December 2019, Haque retired and Masud Bin Momen was made the foreign secretary of Bangladesh. He was the acting president of Bangladesh Foreign Service Association.

Shahidul Haque is a senior fellow at the South Asian Institute of Policy and Governance at North South University.

== Personal life ==
Shahidul Haque is married and has two daughters. Shahidul Haque tested positive with COVID-19 during the COVID-19 pandemic in Bangladesh.
