= Ambassadors of Bangladesh =

Bangladeshi diplomatic position

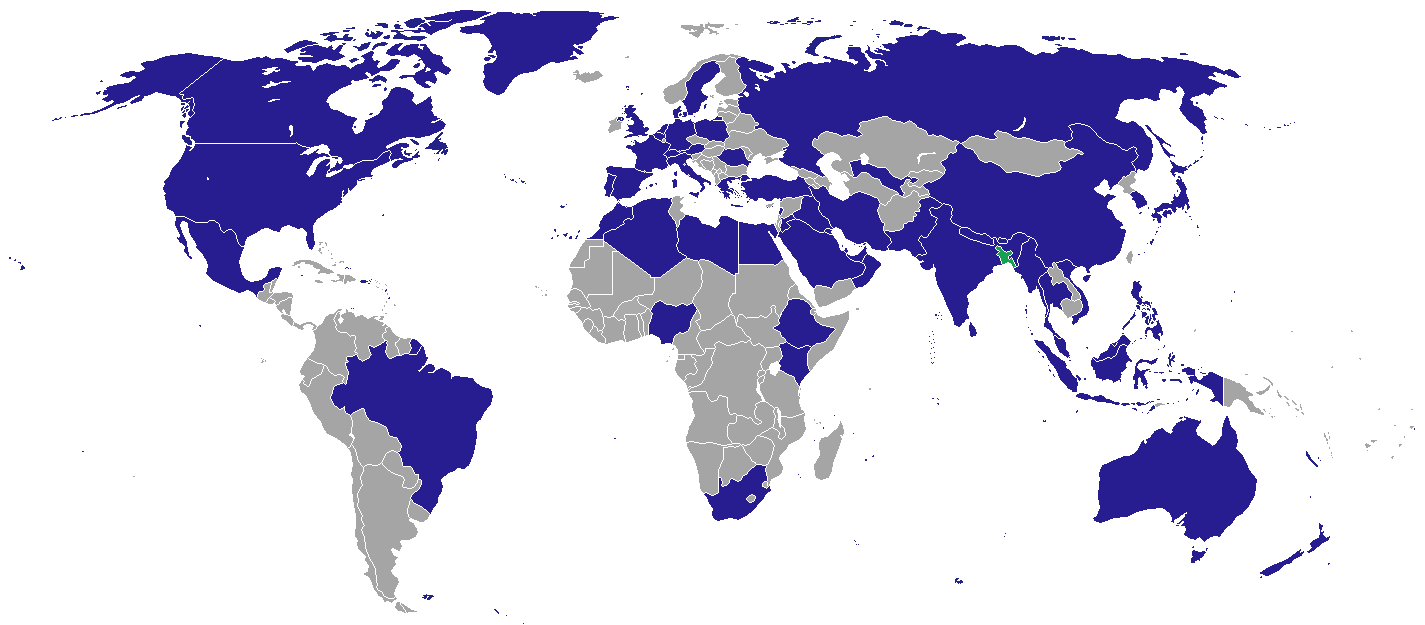
Map of countries and territories with current diplomatic missions of Bangladesh People's Republic of Bangladesh Hosts a Bangladeshi embassy/high commission

Ambassadors of Bangladesh are persons appointed by the President of Bangladesh to serve as Bangladesh's diplomatic representatives to foreign nations, international organizations, and as ambassadors-at-large. As of 2024, it has 80 missions around the world, of which 58 are embassies or high commissions, 20 are consular missions, and two are permanent missions to the United Nations in New York City and Geneva.

== Current ambassadors of Bangladesh ==
=== Asia ===
| Host country | Officeholder | Title | Term start | Reference/s |
|---|---|---|---|---|
| Bahrain | Md Rais Hasan Sarower | Ambassador | 25 February 2025 | |
| Bhutan | Shib Nath Roy | Ambassador | 2 December 2022 | |
| Brunei | Naureen Ahsan | Ambassador | June 2024 | |
| China | Md. Nazmul Islam | Ambassador. Accredited to Mongolia and North Korea | December 2024 | |
| India | M. Riaz Hamidullah | High Commissioner | 29 May 2025 | |
| Indonesia | Abul Hasan Mridha | Ambassador | 9 July 2026 | |
| Iran | | Ambassador | | |
| Iraq | Muhammad Maksudul Haque | Ambassador | July 2025 | |
| Japan | Md Daud Ali | Ambassador | 12 December 2024 | |
| Jordan | Noor-E Helal Saifur Rahman | Ambassador | 25 August 2024 | |
| Kuwait | Sayed Tareq Hussain | Ambassador. Accredited to Yemen | 8 July 2024 | |
| Lebanon | Vacant | Ambassador | 1 June 2025 | |
| Malaysia | Manjurul Karim Khan Chowdhury | High Commissioner | 6 October 2025 | |
| Maldives | Vacant | High Commissioner | 8 March 2026 | |
| Myanmar | Vacant | Ambassador | | |
| Nepal | Shafiqur Rahman | Ambassador | 12 June 2025 | |
| Oman | Khondkar Misbah-ul-Azim | Ambassador | April 2025 | |
| Pakistan | Iqbal Hussain Khan | Ambassador | 12 December 2024 | |
| Philippines | Mohammad Sarwar Mahmood | Ambassador | 17 April 2025 | |
| Qatar | Mohammad Hazrat Ali Khan | Ambassador | 3 August 2025 | |
| Saudi Arabia | Md. Delwar Hossain | Ambassador | 25 December 2024 | |
| Singapore | Vacant | High Commissioner | November 2024 | |
| South Korea | Toufiq Islam Shatil | Ambassador | 28 February 2025 | |
| Sri Lanka | D. M. Salahuddin Mahmud | High Commissioner | August 2026 | |
| Thailand | Andalib Elias | Ambassador. Accredited to Cambodia | September 2026 | |
| Turkey | M Amanul Haq | Ambassador | January 2023 | |
| United Arab Emirates | Tareq Ahmed | Ambassador | December 2024 | |
| Uzbekistan | Mohammad Manirul Islam | Ambassador. Accredited to Afghanistan, Kyrgyzstan, and Tajikistan | August 2023 | |
| Vietnam | Md Lutfor Rahman | Ambassador. Accredited to Laos | 27 December 2023 | |

=== Africa ===
| Host country | Officeholder | Title | Term start | Reference/s |
|---|---|---|---|---|
| Algeria | Md. Najmul Huda | Ambassador. Accredited to Cameroon, Gabon, Mali, and Mauritania | 29 May 2025 | |
| Ethiopia | Sitwat Nayeem | Ambassador. Accredited to Sudan, South Sudan and Burundi, and Permanent Representative to African Union and UN-Economic Commission for Africa | 4 July 2025 | |
| Egypt | Samina Naz | Ambassador | 23 October 2023 | |
| Kenya | Chiranjib Sarkar | High Commissioner | June 2025 | |
| Libya | Mohammad Habib Ullah | Ambassador. Accredited to Tunisia. | 28 August 2025 | |
| Mauritius | Zokey Ahad | High Commissioner. Accredited to Seychelles and Madagascar | June 2024 | |
| Morocco | Sadia Faizunnesa | Ambassador | June 2025 | |
| Nigeria | Miah Md Mainul Kabir | High Commissioner | 29 July 2025 | |
| South Africa | Shah Ahmed Shafi | High Commissioner | September 2024 | |

=== North America ===
| Host country | Officeholder | Title | Term start | Reference/s |
|---|---|---|---|---|
| Canada | Md. Jashim Uddin | High Commissioner. Accredited to Argentina, Cuba, Jamaica and Venezuela | May 2025 | |
| Mexico | Md Lutfor Rahman | Ambassador. Accredited to Guatemala, Honduras, Ecuador, and Costa Rica | September 2026 | |
| United States | Tareq Md Ariful Islam | Ambassador | 3 September 2025 | |

=== South America ===
| Host country | Officeholder | Title | Term start | Reference/s |
|---|---|---|---|---|
| Brazil | Md. Tauhedul Islam | Ambassador. Accredited to: Argentina, Paraguay | 5 June 2025 | |

=== Europe ===
| Host country | Officeholder | Title | Term start | Reference/s |
|---|---|---|---|---|
| Austria | Toufique Hasan | Ambassador; Permanent Representative of Bangladesh to the United Nations Office in Vienna; Accredited to Hungary, Slovenia, and Slovakia | 18 February 2025 | |
| Belgium | Khandaker Masudul Alam | Ambassador. Permanent Representative to EU. Accredited to Luxembourg | March 2025 | |
| Denmark | Vacant | Ambassador | July 2022 | |
| France | Khondker M. Talha | Ambassador | September 2021 | |
| Germany | Muhammad Zulqar Nain | Ambassador | March 2025 | |
| Greece | Nahida Rahman Shumona | Ambassador | 3 July 2024 | |
| Italy | A. T. M. Rokebul Haque | Ambassador | October 2024 | |
| Netherlands | Faiyaz Murshid Kazi | Ambassador. Accredited to Croatia, and Bosnia and Herzegovina | July 2026 | |
| Poland | Vacant | Ambassador. Accredited to Latvia, Lithuania, and Ukraine | 8 March 2026 | |
| Portugal | Vacant | Ambassador | 8 March 2026 | |
| Romania | Shahnaz Gazi | Ambassador. Accredited to Bulgaria,North Macedonia, and Moldova | January 2025 | |
| Russia | Md. Nazrul Islam | Ambassador. Accredited to Belarus and Kazakhstan | 20 June 2025 | |
| Spain | Masudur Rahman | Ambassador | 10 April 2025 | |
| Sweden | Wahida Ahmed | Ambassador. Accredited to Norway and Finland | 23 April 2025 | |
| Switzerland | Nahida Sobhan | Ambassador. Also Permanent Representative of Bangladesh to the United Nations Office in Geneva | May 2025 | |
| United Kingdom | Muhammad Abdul Muhith | High Commissioner | 24 August 2026 | |

=== Oceania ===
| Host country | Officeholder | Title | Term start | Reference/s |
|---|---|---|---|---|
| Australia | F. M. Borhan Uddin | High Commissioner. Accredited to New Zealand and Fiji | 25 March 2025 | |
