= Andalib Elias =

Bangladeshi diplomat

- আন্দালিব ইলিয়াস

Ambassador of Bangladesh to Thailand
- Incumbent
- Assumed office September 2026
- Preceded by: Faiyaz Murshid Kazi

High Commissioner of Bangladesh to Sri Lanka
- In office 12 August 2024 – September 2026
- Preceded by: Tareq Md Ariful Islam
- Succeeded by: D. M. Salahuddin Mahmud

Personal details
- Parent: Akhteruzzaman Elias (father)
- Education: University of Dhaka

Andalib Elias is a Bangladeshi diplomat and the incumbent ambassador of Bangladesh to Thailand since September 2026. He was the high commissioner to Sri Lanka. He is a former Deputy High Commissioner of Bangladesh to India. He was the director-general of the multilateral economic affairs wing of the Ministry of Foreign Affairs

== Early life ==
Elias did his master's in economics at the University of Dhaka. He was the son of Akhteruzzaman Elias, a novelist and short story writer.

== Career ==
Elias joined the foreign affairs cadre of the 20th batch of Bangladesh Civil Service in 2001. He served as the Permanent Mission of Bangladesh to the United Nations and the Permanent Mission of Bangladesh to the United Nations in Geneva. He was the chief negotiator of the Group of 77.

Elias was the director-general of the multilateral economic affairs wing of the Ministry of Foreign Affairs. He later served as the Ministry's director general of the West Europe and EU Wing.

Elias was the Deputy High Commissioner of Bangladesh in Kolkata. He inaugurated the Global Friendship Art Festival India 2023 at the Visva-Bharati University. He screened Mujib: The Making of a Nation at the Deputy High Commission of Bangladesh in Kolkata.

In June 2024, Elias was appointed High Commissioner of Bangladesh to Sri Lanka.
