= List of high commissioners of Bangladesh to India =

High Commissioner of Bangladesh to the India
- ভারতে নিযুক্ত বাংলাদেশের হাইকমিশনার
- Government Seal of Bangladesh
- Incumbent; M. Riaz Hamidullah since May 29, 2025
- Ministry of Foreign Affairs
- Style: The Honourable (formal); Mr. High Commissioner (informal); His Excellency (diplomatic)
- Reports to: Chief Adviser; Minister of Foreign Affairs
- Residence: New Delhi, Delhi
- Seat: High Commission of Bangladesh, New Delhi, India
- Nominator: The government of Bangladesh
- Appointer: The president of Bangladesh; on the advice of the; chief adviser
- Term length: Chief adviser’s pleasure
- Inaugural holder: A R Mallick
- Formation: 13 March 1972; 54 years ago
- Salary: ৳300000 (US$2,400) per month (incl. allowances)
- Website: Official website

The high commissioner of Bangladesh to the Republic of India is the chief diplomatic representative of Bangladesh to India.

== List of Bangladeshi high commissioners to India ==
No.	Image	Name	Took office	Left office	Notes
1		Azizur Rahman Mallick	13 March 1972	25 January 1975	
2		Khan Shamsur Rahman	7 August 1975	16 October 1978	
3		Abul Ehsan	21 November 1978		
4		Abdul Karim Khandker	15 July 1982	25 July 1986	
5		Faruq Ahmed Choudhury	8 August 1986	3 January 1992	
6		Farooq Sobhan	19 May 1992	28 February 1995	
7		C. M. Shafi Sami	7 April 1995	7 June 1999	
8		Mostafa Faruk Mohammad	6 August 1999	31 December 2001	
9		Tufail K. Haider	31 January 2002	15 October 2003	
10		Hemayet Uddin	23 November 2003	8 March 2005	
11		Liquat Ali Chowdhury	28 May 2005	6 May 2009	
12		Tariq Ahmed Karim	August 2009	October 2014	
13		Syed Muazzem Ali	2014	November 2019	
14		Muhammad Imran	November 2019	July 2022	
15		Mustafizur Rahman	July 2022	October 2024	
16		M. Riaz Hamidullah	May 2025	Incumbent	

== See also ==
- List of high commissioners of Bangladesh to Pakistan
- List of ambassadors of Bangladesh to the United States
- List of high commissioners of Bangladesh to Canada
- List of ambassadors of Bangladesh to Turkey
- List of ambassadors of India to Bangladesh
- List of ambassadors of Bangladesh to Kingdom of Saudi Arabia
- List of high commissioners of Bangladesh to the United Kingdom
