= M. Riaz Hamidullah =

Bangladeshi diplomat

Muhammad Riaz Hamidullah
- মোহাম্মদ রিয়াজ হামিদুল্লাহ
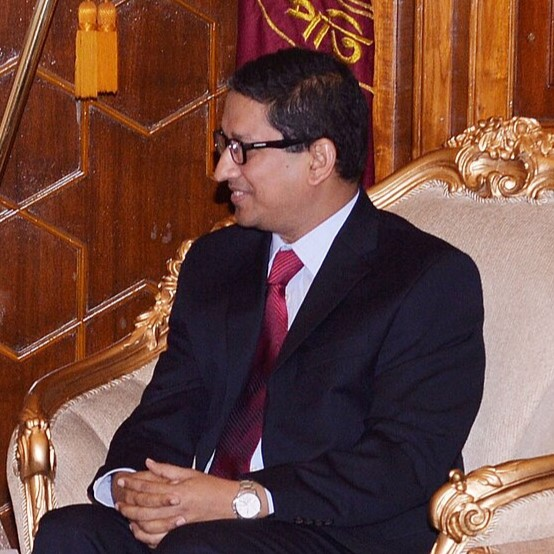
- Mohammad Riaz Hamidullah in 2016.

High Commissioner of Bangladesh to India
- Incumbent
- Assumed office 29 May 2025
- President: Mohammed Shahabuddin; Hafiz Uddin Ahmad (acting); Mirza Fakhrul Islam Alamgir
- Prime Minister: Muhammad Yunus (Chief Adviser); Tarique Rahman
- Preceded by: Mustafizur Rahman

Ambassador of Bangladesh to The Netherlands
- In office 12 July 2020 – 04 August 2024
- President: Mohammad Abdul Hamid; Mohammed Shahabuddin
- Prime Minister: Sheikh Hasina
- Preceded by: Sheikh Mohammed Belal
- Succeeded by: Tareque Muhammad

High Commissioner of Bangladesh to Sri Lanka
- In office 23 October 2016 – 4 July 2020
- President: Mohammad Abdul Hamid
- Prime Minister: Sheikh Hasina
- Preceded by: Tarik Ahsan
- Succeeded by: Tareq Md Ariful Islam

Personal details
- Born: East Pakistan (present day Bangladesh)
- Citizenship: Bangladesh
- Spouse: Mrs Sazia Ahmed
- Children: 2
- Education: Aligarh Muslim University; University of Dhaka

Muhammad Riaz Hamidullah is a Bangladeshi diplomat, currently serving as the High Commissioner of Bangladesh to India. Prior to this, he served as the Additional Foreign Secretary of the Ministry of Foreign Affairs.

He previously held the positions of Bangladesh's Ambassador to the Netherlands and High Commissioner to Sri Lanka. Additionally, he served as a Director at the South Asian Association for Regional Cooperation (SAARC) Secretariat.

== Early life ==
Hamidullah completed his undergrad in economics at the Aligarh Muslim University in 1993. He completed his masters in economics at the University of Dhaka in 1995.

== Career ==
Hamidullah joined the Foreign Service cadre of 15th batch of Bangladesh Civil Service in 1995. From 1999 to 2003, he worked at the Permanent Mission of Bangladesh to the United Nations.From 2003 to 2005, he was stationed at the High Commission of Bangladesh in India.

Hamidullah served as director of the South Asian Association for Regional Cooperation Secretariat in Kathmandu from 1 February 2008 to 4 July 2011. He replaced Tareque Mohammed and was replaced by Md. Sufiur Rahman.

In 2011, Hamidullah was appointed Director General at the Ministry of Foreign Affairs.

In October 2016, Hamidullah was appointed High Commissioner of Bangladesh to Sri Lanka replacing Tarik Ahsan. He served till July 2020 and was replaced by Tareq Md Ariful Islam.

On 6 July 2020, Hamidullah was appointed Ambassador of Bangladesh to the Netherlands. He was concurrently ambassador of Bangladesh to Bosnia and Herzegovina. He was also the ambassador of Bangladesh to Croatia. He organized an event to mark International Mother Language Day in 2024 on the campus of Leiden University. He was the Permanent Representative of Bangladesh to the Organization for the Prohibition of Chemical Weapons.

== Personal life ==
Mohammad Riaz is married to Sazia Ahmed, and they have two sons.
