= Tareque Muhammad =

Bangladeshi diplomat

- তারেক মুহাম্মদ

Ambassador of Bangladesh to the Netherlands
- In office June 2024 – August 2026
- President: Mohammed Shahabuddin
- Prime Minister: Sheikh Hasina; Muhammad Yunus (Chief Adviser)
- Preceded by: M. Riaz Hamidullah
- Succeeded by: Faiyaz Murshid Kazi

High Commissioner of Bangladesh to Kenya
- In office February 2022 – June 2024
- President: Mohammad Abdul Hamid; Mohammed Shahabuddin
- Prime Minister: Sheikh Hasina
- Succeeded by: Chiranjib Sarkar

Personal details
- Education: University of Chittagong

Tareque Muhammad is a Bangladeshi diplomat and a former ambassador of Bangladesh to the Netherlands. He is a former high commissioner to Kenya. He was the deputy commissioner of Bangladesh to Myanmar.

== Early life ==
Muhmmad did his bachelor's in forestry and environmental science at the University of Chittagong. He then finished an MBA at the Institute of Business Administration, University of Dhaka. From 1995 to 1999, he worked at the Forest Department. He did another master's at University of Leeds in international studies on a Chevening Scholarships.

== Career ==
Muhammad joined the 18th batch of the Bangladesh Civil Service in 1999 as a foreign service cadre. He has served in Kathmandu, Madrid, New Delhi, and Yangon.

From 2011 to 2014, Muhmmad was the Director (Bangladesh) of the South Asian Association of Regional Cooperation. He was the Director General of South Asia Wing and the Director General of the South East Asia Wing at the Ministry of Foreign Affairs. He summoned Acting High Commissioner of Pakistan in Dhaka Shah Faisal Kakar over derogatory comments on Sheikh Mujibur Rahman on “defence.pk”. He was the coordinator of the Rohingya refugees in Bangladesh at the Ministry of Foreign Affairs. He was the deputy High commissioner of Bangladesh to Myanmar.

Muhammad was appointed the High commissioner of Bangladesh to Kenya in February 2022. He is the former consul general of Bangladesh in Los Angeles. He was also the Permanent Representative of Bangladesh to the United Nations Human Settlements Programme and the United Nations Environment Programme. In August 2023, he attended the conference of Bangladeshi Ambassadors in Africa held in South Africa where the chief guest was Prime Minister Sheikh Hasina. He attended the Third South Summit in Uganda where Antonio Guterres praised the leadership of Sheikh Hasina to Minister of Foreign Affairs Hasan Mahmud. He was present at when President William Samoei Ruto visited a factory of Bangladesh Square Pharmaceuticals in Kenya.

In June 2024, Muhmmad was appointed ambassador of Bangladesh to the Netherlands replacing Ambassador M. Riaz Hamidullah.
