= Najmul Huda =

Najmul Huda may refer to:

- Khondkar Nazmul Huda (1938–1975), Bangladeshi soldier
- Md. Najmul Huda, Bangladeshi diplomat
