= Zahangir Alam (diplomat) =

Bangladeshi diplomat

Md. Zahangir Alam

Ambassador of Bangladesh to Uzbekistan
- In office 2020–2023
- Preceded by: Mosud Mannan
- Succeeded by: Mohammad Monirul Islam

Personal details
- Born: Bangladesh
- Education: University of Dhaka
- Occupation: Diplomat, Civil servant

Md. Zahangir Alam is a Bangladeshi diplomat and former Ambassador of Bangladesh to Uzbekistan.

== Early life and education ==
Alam completed his Bachelors and Master’s degrees in English Language from the University of Dhaka.

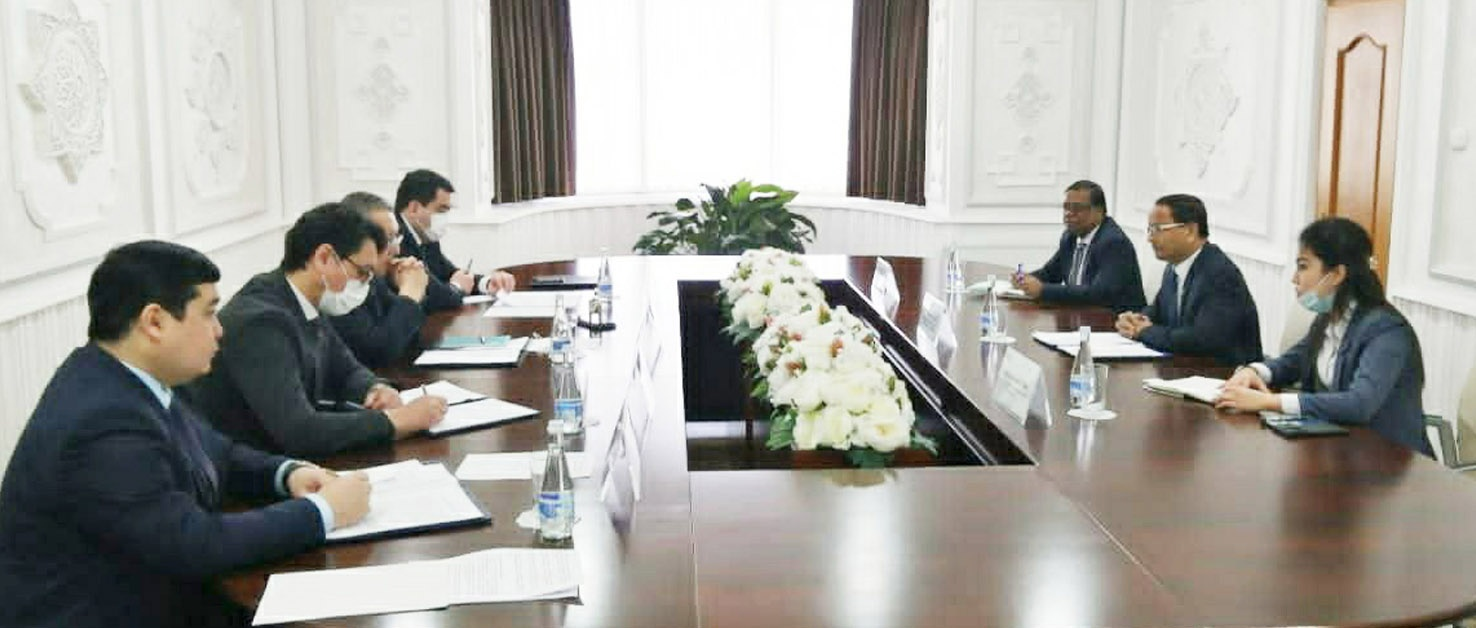
Alam meets Central Bank of Uzbekistan Chairman Mamarizo Berdimuratovich Nurmuratov on 26 January 2022.

== Career ==
Alam joined the Bangladesh Civil Service Administration cadre as part of the 1986 batch. Over the course of his career, he served in various capacities both in field administration and within the government secretariat.

Alam held several important positions in the Ministry of Foreign Affairs. Prior to his appointment as ambassador, he served as an Additional Secretary in the Legal Affairs Wing of the Ministry of Foreign Affairs. Earlier, he worked as a Joint Secretary in the Asia Wing of the Economic Relations Division.

In July 2020, the Government of Bangladesh appointed Alam as the Ambassador of Bangladesh to Uzbekistan. He replaced Ambassador Mosud Mannan. While serving as Ambassador he completed his PhD at the University of World Economy and Diplomacy in economic sciences. In August 2023, Mohammad Monirul Islam replaced him as the Ambassador of Bangladesh to Uzbekistan.
