= M Allama Siddiki =

Bangladeshi diplomat

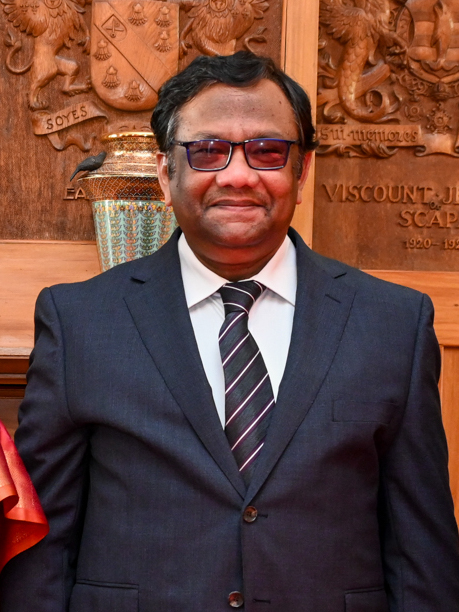
- Siddiki in Wellington, New Zealand (2023)

Bangladesh High Commissioner to the Australia
- In office 31 July 2022 – March 2025
- President: Abdul Hamid; Mohammed Shahabuddin
- Prime Minister: Sheikh Hasina; Muhammad Yunus (acting)
- Preceded by: Mohammad Sufiur Rahman
- Succeeded by: F. M. Borhan Uddin

Bangladesh Ambassador to the Denmark
- In office 16 October 2020 – 19 November 2022
- Preceded by: Muhammad Abdul Muhith
- Succeeded by: A. K. M. Shahidul Karim

Bangladesh Ambassador to the Turkey
- In office 23 April 2015 – 29 September 2020
- Preceded by: Zulfiqur Rahman
- Succeeded by: Mosud Mannan

Personal details
- Born: 2 December 1965 (age 60) East Pakistan
- Spouse: Rashna Farruk Siddik
- Children: 2 daughters
- Education: University of Dhaka

M Allama Siddiki (born 2 December 1965) is a Bangladeshi diplomat and the current Bangladesh High Commissioner to Australia since July 2022. He is also accredited to New Zealand and Fiji. Prior to this position, he served as the ambassador to Denmark and Turkey. He was also accredited to Azerbaijan, Bulgaria, Azerbaijan, and Armenia.

== Education ==
Siddiki earned his bachelor's and master's degrees in public administration from the University of Dhaka.

== Career ==
Siddiki is a career foreign service officer from the 10th batch of the Bangladesh Civil Service Foreign Affairs cadre.

On 31 July 2022, Siddiki was appointed High Commissioner of Bangladesh to Australia. He had been serving as the Bangladesh Ambassador to Denmark. A. K. M. Shahidul Karim succeeded him as the Ambassador to Denmark.

== Personal life ==
Siddiki is married to Rashna Farruk Siddiki.
