= Toufique Hasan =

Bangladeshi diplomat

- তৌফিক হাসান

Ambassador of Bangladesh to Austria
- Incumbent
- Assumed office 18 February 2025
- President: Mohammed Shahabuddin
- Prime Minister: Muhammad Yunus (Chief Adviser)
- Preceded by: Asad Alam Siam

Director General of United Nations Wing & Spokesperson Ministry of Foreign Affairs
- In office 22 October 2024 – 10 February 2025
- President: Mohammed Shahabuddin
- Prime Minister: Sheikh Hasina

Director General of East Asia & Pacific Wing Ministry of Foreign Affairs
- In office 1 January 2023 – 21 October 2024
- President: Mohammed Shahabuddin
- Prime Minister: Sheikh Hasina

Personal details
- Education: University of Dhaka

Toufique Hasan is a Bangladeshi diplomat and the incumbent ambassador of Bangladesh to Austria. He was the Director General of the East Asia & Pacific Wing at the Ministry of Foreign Affairs. He is the former Deputy High Commissioner of Bangladesh in Kolkata. He was the counsellor at the Bangladesh embassy in Washington D.C.

== Career ==
Hasan has served at the Bangladesh Embassy in Paris from 2005 to 2008. He was stationed at the Bangladesh Embassy in Bangkok from 2009 to 2012 and the Bangladesh Embassy in Washington, D. C. from 2014 to 2017.

Hasan was the Deputy High Commission of Bangladesh in Kolkata, India from 2017 to 2022. He provided medical supplies to the Indian Red Crescent Society in Kolkata during the COVID-19 pandemic. He sent the first secretary (Political) Md Saniul Kader back to Dhaka after video recording of him sexting was leaked.

Hasan was the Director General of the Public Diplomacy Wing at the Ministry of Foreign Affairs from 2022 to 2023. He then served as the Director General of East Asia and Pacific Wing and afterwards United Nations Wing at the Ministry of Foreign Affairs. He was the spokesman for the Ministry of Foreign Affairs. He conveyed displeasure of the Muhammad Yunus led interim government at former Prime Minister Sheikh Hasina making statements from India.

In 2025, Hasan was appointed ambassador of Bangladesh to Austria and the Permanent Representative of Bangladesh to the United Nations in Vienna. The decision to send him was made by the Ministry of Foreign Affairs in November 2024 as part of large number of changes of ambassadors at Bangladesh Embassies around the world.
