= Shib Nath Roy =

Bangladeshi civil servant (born 1963)

Ambassador of Bangladesh to Bhutan
- Incumbent
- Assumed office 2 December 2022
- President: Mohammad Abdul Hamid; Mohammed Shahabuddin
- Prime Minister: Sheikh Hasina; Muhammad Yunus(Chief Adviser)
- Preceded by: A. K. M. Shahidul Karim

Personal details
- Born: 1 July 1963 (age 63) Gopalganj District, East Pakistan, Pakistan
- Education: University of Dhaka

Shib Nath Roy is a Bangladeshi civil servant and the Ambassador of Bangladesh to Bhutan. He is a former Inspector General of Department of Inspection for Factories and Establishments.

== Early life ==
Roy was born on 1 July 1963 in Gopalganj District, East Pakistan, Pakistan. He did his undergrad and master's in economics from the University of Dhaka.

== Career ==
On 20 December 1989, Roy joined the Bangladesh Civil Service as an administration cadre.

Roy was the Assistant Commissioner in the Rajshahi Divisional Commissioner's Office from 20 December 1989 to 31 December 1989. He was the Assistant Commissioner of the Dinajpur District Commissioners Office from January 1990 to October 1992. He was the Assistant Commissioner of Land in Dinajpur District from October 1992 to August 1996. He was the Assistant Commissioner of Land in Natore District from August 1996 to July 1997. He was the Senior Assistant Commissioner of Natore District from July 1997 to June 2001.

Roy was the Upazila Nirbahi Officer of Dighalia Upazila from July 2001 to January 2005. He was the Upazila Nirbahi Officer of Senbagh Upazila from January 2005 to June 2006. He was the deputy director of the National Nutrition Project of the Ministry of Health and Family Welfare from June 2006 to December 2006. He was the deputy director of the National Housing Authority at the Ministry of Housing and Public Works from June 2007 to January 2009.

Roy was the private secretary to the State Minister of Youth and Sports Ahad Ali Sarker from January 2009 to July 2013. He was Secretary of the National Sports Council at the Ministry of Youth and Sports from September 2013 to July 2015. He was the Joint Secretary of the Economic Relations Division of the Ministry of Finance from July 2015 to August 2016.

From November 2016 to December 2017, Roy was Director General of Legal Affairs and Coordination Wing at the Ministry of Foreign Affairs. Roy was the Director General of the Department of Labour of the Ministry of Labour and Employment from December 2017 to March 2019. He was the Inspector General of Department of Inspection for Factories and Establishments from March 2019 to November 2020. He was awarded the National Integrity Award.

Roy was the Additional Secretary of the Ministry of Industries from November 2020 to October 2021. From October 2021 to June 2022, Roy was a Director General at the Ministry of Foreign Affairs.

On 2 December 2022, Roy was appointed Ambassador of Bangladesh to Bhutan. He had pushed to import electricity from Bhutan.
