= A. K. M. Shahidul Karim =

Shahidul Karim
- শহীদুল করিম

Ambassador of Bangladesh to Denmark
- In office 1 December 2022 – 14 March 2026
- Preceded by: M Allama Siddiki
- Succeeded by: Vacant

Ambassador of Bangladesh to Bhutan
- In office 5 December 2019 – 31 Jul 2022
- Preceded by: Jishnu Roy Chowdhury
- Succeeded by: Shib Nath Roy

Personal details
- Born: 1 October 1971 (age 55)
- Education: Bangladesh University of Engineering and Technology

Shahidul Karim (born 1 October 1971) is a Bangladeshi diplomat and was a Bangladesh ambassador to Denmark from December 2022 until March 2026. He previously served as the ambassador to Bhutan.

== Early life ==
Karim earned his bachelor's degree in electrical and electronic engineering from Bangladesh University of Engineering and Technology.

== Career ==
Karim enlisted into the 18th batch of Bangladesh Civil Service foreign affairs cadre. He served as the Consul General of Bangladesh in Jeddah, Saudi Arabia.

From 2019 to 2022, Karim was the ambassador of Bangladesh to Bhutan. He was the former Chief of Protocol at the Ministry of Foreign Affairs.

In July 2022, Karim was appointed the Ambassador of Bangladesh to Denmark.

== Personal life ==
Karim is married to Syeda Mahrufa Akter.
