= Tareq Md Ariful Islam =

Tareq Md. Ariful Islam
- তারেক মোঃ আরিফুল ইসলাম

Ambassador of Bangladesh to the United States
- Incumbent
- Assumed office 3 September 2025
- President: Mohammed Shahabuddin; Hafiz Uddin Ahmad (acting); Mirza Fakhrul Islam Alamgir
- Prime Minister: Muhammad Yunus (as Chief Adviser); Tarique Rahman
- Preceded by: Asad Alam Siam

Ambassador of Bangladesh to Switzerland Permanent Representative of Bangladesh to the United Nations Office in Geneva
- In office July 2024 – May 2025
- President: Mohammed Shahabuddin
- Prime Minister: Sheikh Hasina; Muhammad Yunus (as Chief Adviser)
- Preceded by: Mohammad Sufiur Rahman
- Succeeded by: Nahida Sobhan

High Commissioner of Bangladesh to Sri Lanka
- In office 28 November 2020 – 26 July 2024
- President: Muhammad Abdul Hamid; Mohammed Shahabuddin
- Prime Minister: Sheikh Hasina
- Preceded by: M. Riaz Hamidullah
- Succeeded by: Andalib Elias

Personal details
- Education: Bangladesh University of Engineering and Technology; Monash University

Tareq Md Ariful Islam is a Bangladeshi diplomat and the Ambassador of Bangladesh to the United States. He is a former high commissioner of Bangladesh to Sri Lanka and Permanent Representative of Bangladesh to the United Nations Office in Geneva.

== Early life ==
Tareq Md Ariful Islam has a bachelor's degree in civil engineering from the Bangladesh University of Engineering and Technology. He did his master's degree in diplomacy and trade at Monash University.

== Career ==
Islam joined the foreign service through the 17th batch of the Bangladesh Civil Service in 1998. From 2005 to 2009, Islam was the secretary of the Permanent Mission of Bangladesh to the United Nations.

In 2012, Islam was the acting deputy high commissioner of Bangladesh based in Kolkata. He served as the commission from 2009 to 2012. Islam was the director general of the South Asia wing at the Ministry of Foreign Affairs. Before that he was a director of the South Asia wing. He had served in the personal wing of the secretary of the Ministry of Foreign Affairs.

In December 2018, as chargé de affairs of the Permanent Mission of Bangladesh to the United Nations, Islam put forward the "Culture of Peace" resolution, which was unanimously adopted by the United Nations General Assembly.

He was the deputy permanent representative of the Permanent Mission of Bangladesh to the United Nations from 2016 to 2020.

Islam served as the high commissioner to Sri Lanka from 5 July 2020 until 26 July 2024. He delivered mangos from Prime Minister Sheikh Hasina to Prime Minister Mahinda Rajapaksa as part of Bangladesh's "mango diplomacy" in 2021.

In June 2024, Islam was appointed the permanent representative of Bangladesh to the United Nations Office in Geneva. On 7 August 2024, Islam presented his credentials to Tatiana Valovaya, director general of the United Nations Office in Geneva. He was succeeded by Nahida Sobhan in May 2025.

On 3 September 2025, Islam was appointed the ambassador of Bangladesh to the United States.
