= Mohammad Monirul Islam (diplomat) =

Bangladeshi diplomat

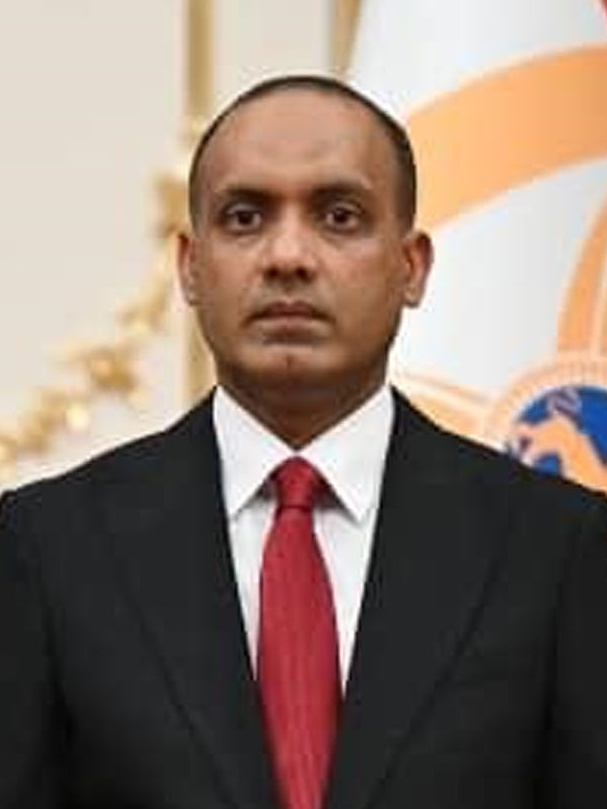
- Islam in 2024

Bangladesh ambassador to Uzbekistan
- Incumbent
- Assumed office 8 August 2023
- Preceded by: Md Zahangir Alam

Personal details
- Born: Dhaka

Mohammad Monirul Islam is a diplomat and the ambassador of Bangladesh to Uzbekistan.

== Early life ==
Islam was born in Dhaka. He completed his bachelor's and master's degrees in pharmacy at the University of Dhaka. He completed his second master's and PhD in India.

== Career ==
Islam joined the foreign service branch of the Bangladesh Civil Service in 2001 in the 20th branch. Islam served as the director general of the Multilateral Economic Affairs Wing at the Ministry of Foreign Affairs. He served in the Bangladesh high commissions in India and Pakistan. He served in the embassy of Bangladesh in Turkey and Japan.

In August 2023, Islam was appointed the ambassador of Bangladesh to Uzbekistan, replacing ambassador Md. Zahangir Alam. He was then the Bangladeshi consul general in New York City. He was replaced by Md. Najmul Huda in New York City. He is also accredited as the ambassador of Bangladesh to Afghanistan, Kyrgyzstan, and Tajikistan.
