= Asad Alam Siam =

Bangladeshi diplomat

- আসাদ আলম সিয়াম
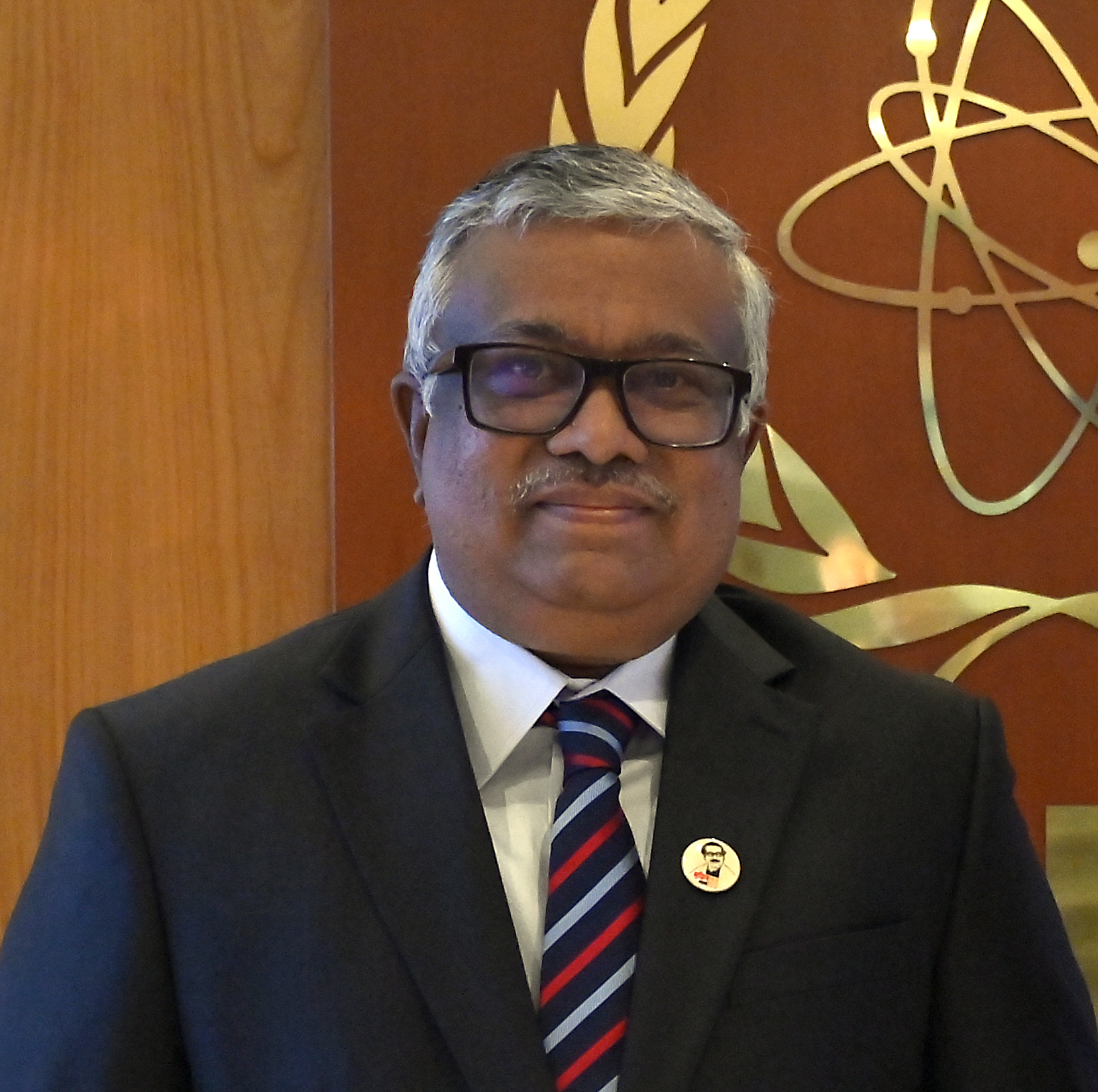
- Siam in 2023

Foreign Secretary of Bangladesh
- Incumbent
- Assumed office 19 June 2025
- President: Mohammed Shahabuddin; Hafiz Uddin Ahmad (acting); Mirza Fakhrul Islam Alamgir
- Prime Minister: Tarique Rahman Muhammad Yunus (Chief Adviser)
- Preceded by: Md. Jashim Uddin

Ambassador of Bangladesh to the United States
- In office 4 November 2024 – 10 June 2025
- President: Mohammed Shahabuddin
- Prime Minister: Sheikh Hasina; Muhammad Yunus (as Chief Adviser)
- Preceded by: Muhammad Imran
- Succeeded by: Tareq Md Ariful Islam

Ambassador of Bangladesh to Austria
- In office 28 August 2023 – 1 November 2024
- President: Mohammad Abdul Hamid; Mohammed Shahabuddin
- Prime Minister: Sheikh Hasina; Muhammad Yunus (Chief Adviser)
- Preceded by: Muhammad Abdul Muhith
- Succeeded by: Toufique Hasan

Ambassador of Bangladesh to the Philippines
- In office 14 January 2017 – 2021
- President: Mohammad Abdul Hamid
- Prime Minister: Sheikh Hasina
- Preceded by: John Gomes
- Succeeded by: F. M. Borhan Uddin

Personal details
- Born: East Pakistan
- Education: Bangladesh University of Engineering and Technology

Asad Alam Siam is a Bangladeshi diplomat who is currently serving as the Secretary of Ministry of Foreign Affairs. Prior to this appointment he was ambassador of Bangladesh to the United States. He held this position from 5 December 2024 to June 2025. Previously he was ambassador of Bangladesh to Austria and also the Permanent Representative of Bangladesh to the International Organizations in Vienna. Prior to this, he served as the ambassador to the Philippines.

== Education ==
Siam completed his bachelor's in architecture from Bangladesh University of Engineering and Technology (BUET) and an MBA from Maastricht School of Management in the Netherlands. He belongs to the 15th batch of Bangladesh Civil Service (BCS) of Foreign Affairs cadre. He is an alumnus of Mirzapur Cadet College (19th batch).

== Career ==
Siam joined the foreign service in 1995. He served as the Chief of Protocol and Rector of the Foreign Service Academy. He then served as the first consul general of Bangladesh in Milan, Italy.
