= John Gomes (general) =

- Born: Armanitola, East Pakistan, Pakistan
- Military career
- Allegiance: Bangladesh
- Branch: Bangladesh Army
- Service years: 1977–2008
- Rank: Major General
- Unit: East Bengal Regiment
- Commands: Director General of Directorate General of Defence Purchase; Commander of 71st Infantry Brigade; Station Commander, Sylhet
- Conflicts: Chittagong Hill Tracts Conflict; UNMOT

Bangladesh Ambassador to Philippines
- In office 4 October 2012 – November 2016
- Preceded by: Ikhtiar Chowdhury
- Succeeded by: Asad Alam Siam

John Gomes is a retired two-star rank Bangladesh Army officer and diplomat. He served as the ambassador of Bangladesh to the Philippines.

== Early life ==
Gomes was born to a Bengali Christian family of Armanitola, then in East Pakistan, Pakistan (now in Dhaka Division, Bangladesh). He graduated from Notre Dame College, Dhaka, and the University of Dhaka and enlisted in the Bangladesh Military Academy in 1975. Gomes was commissioned in the East Bengal Regiment in 1977. He graduated from Honolulu University with a master's degree in defence studies and business administration.

== Military career ==
Gomes fought in the Chittagong Hill Tracts conflict as company officer delta of the 11th East Bengal Regiment. He commanded one infantry company before being dispatched to Dhaka after the assassination of Ziaur Rahman in May 1981. He was accused in the case but was acquitted in late 1981 and returned to service. Gomes later served as second in command of an East Bengal Regiment and soon transferred to Tajikistan to serve as operation manager in the United Nations Mission of Observers in Tajikistan. Gomes was soon promoted to lieutenant colonel and commanded an infantry battalion and, furthermore, served as general staff officer (grade-1) of the East Bengal Regimental Centre. As colonel Gomes was one of the colonel staff at Director General of Forces Intelligence under the first Hasina ministry. He was later promoted to brigadier general and commanded the 71st Infantry Brigade at Savar Cantonment. Gomes was the first chairman of Morning Glory School and College. Gomes also served as deputy military secretary at army headquarters till 2003. Gomes was promoted to major general in January 2003 and was designated as director general of Directorate General of Defence Purchase. He also served as the president of the Bangladesh Military Christian Fellowship. Gomes went to leave per retirement in 2008 while serving as one of the ambassadors under the Ministry of Foreign Affairs.

=== Post military ===
After retiring from the army, he served as the general manager of management support services at Square Hospital. He is the general secretary of the Notre Dame College Alumni Association.

== Diplomatic career ==
In October 2012, Gomes was appointed the Bangladesh ambassador to the Philippines. In 2014, he was criticized by the Bangladesh Foreign Ministry for inviting Menashe Bar-On, Head of Mission of Israel in Manila, to a private dinner. Bangladesh does not have diplomatic relations with Israel. As ambassador, he was tasked with returning US$81 million that was smuggled to Philippines after the Bangladesh Bank robbery in 2016. In November 2016, the government of Bangladesh appointed Asad Alam Siam to replace him as the ambassador to the Philippines.
