= Masudur Rahman =

Masudur Rahman may refer to:

- Masudur Rahman (umpire), Bangladeshi cricket umpire and cricketer
- Masudur Rahman (referee), footballer and referee
- Masudur Rahman (diplomat), Bangladeshi diplomat and ambassador
