= Bahrain–Bangladesh relations =

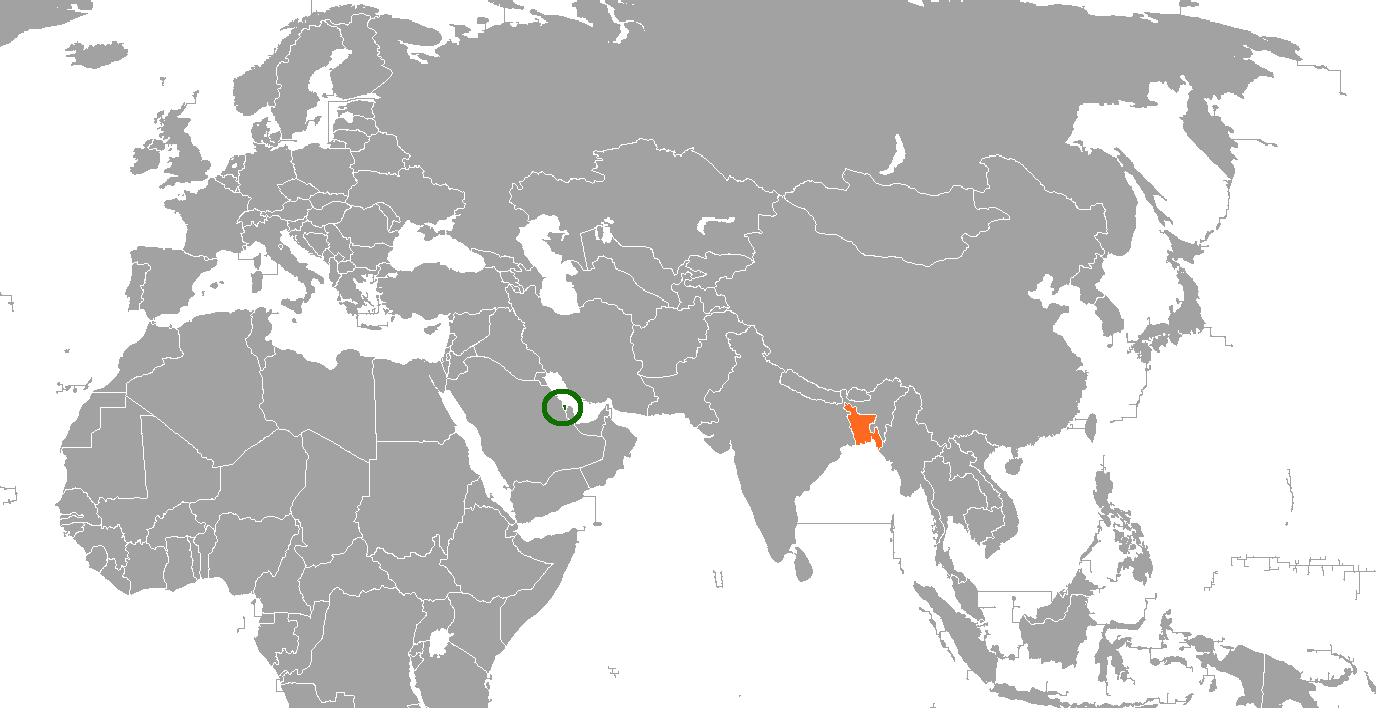

- Bahrain: Bangladesh

Bahrain–Bangladesh relations refer to the relationship between Bahrain and Bangladesh. Bangladesh has an embassy in Manama, with Md. Nazrul Islam as the ambassador. Both countries are members of the Organisation of Islamic Cooperation.

The Labor Market Regulatory Authority (LMRA) estimate that around 70,000 migrant workers that live in Bahrain are undocumented. The majority of them are Bangladeshi workers. Although the government assert the labor code for the private sector applies to all workers, the International Labor Organization (ILO) and international NGOs noted foreign workers faced discrimination in the workplace. In many cases employers withheld passports, restricted movement, substituted contracts, or did not pay wages.

== History ==
Diplomatic relationship was established in 1974 following Bahrain recognizing Bangladesh. On 28 February 1983, Bangladesh opened an embassy in Bahrain.

In 2007, there were 74 thousand Bangladeshi workers in Bahrain making them 10 percent of the population of the Island. Bangladeshi workers have experienced human rights and labor rights violations in the kingdom with limited legal protection.

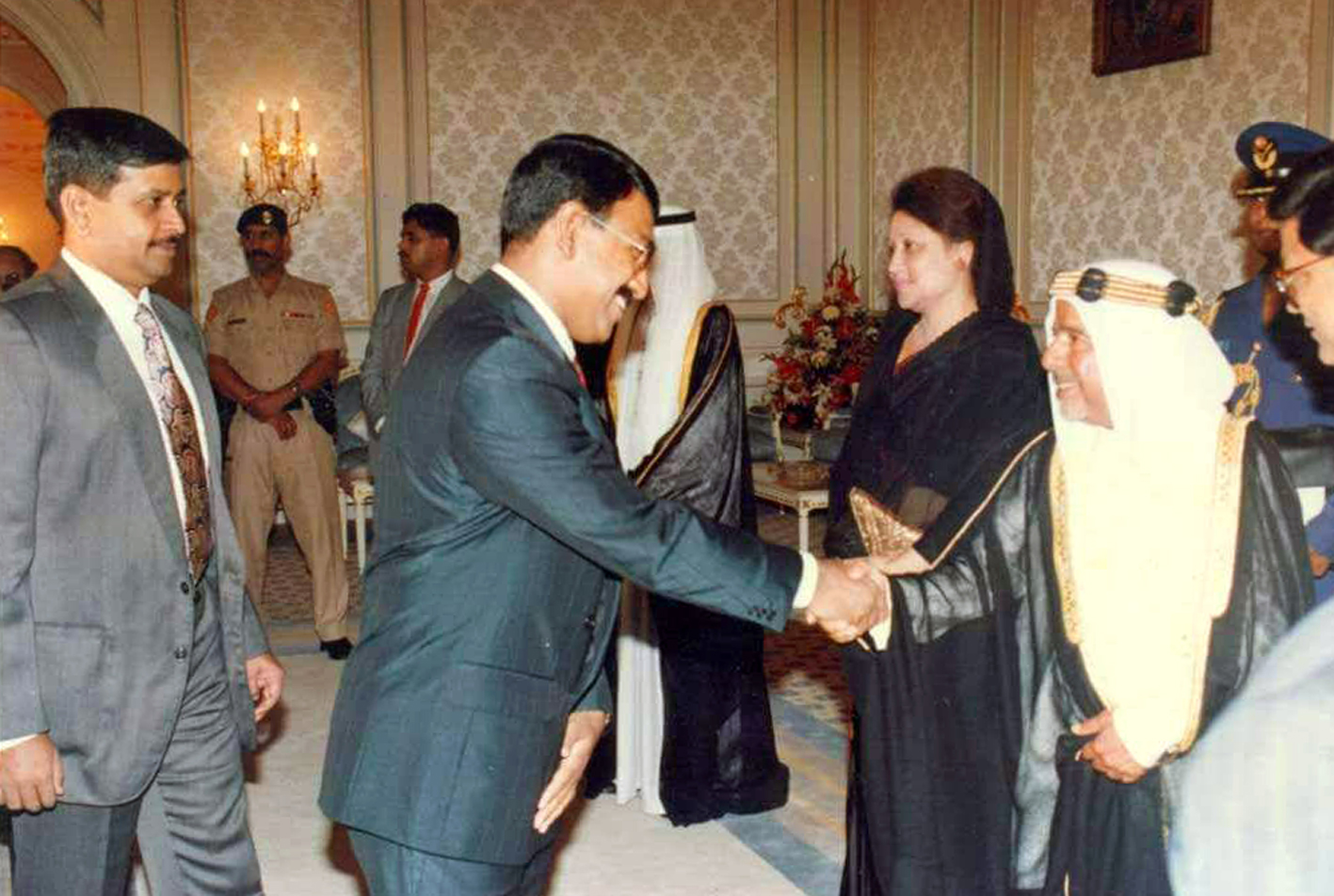
Mohammad Mosaddak Ali met with Emir of Bahrain Isa bin Salman Al Khalifa at the Kings Palace in Bahrain

In May 2008, members of parliament called for expelling all Bangladeshis after a Bangladeshi had killed a Bahraini. The Bangladeshi was working as a cook for the victim. In response the government of Bahrain issued a ban on all Bangladeshis and moved forward with executing a Bangladeshi, who had been convicted of murder in 2006, by firing squad. Bangladesh expressed regret, announced plans for better screening of migrant workers, and called for the ban to be lifted. Bahrain also announced it would not renew the work permits of 100 thousand Bangladeshi workers in the country.

Bahrain stopped providing visas to Bangladeshis in 2018. Eight thousand Bangladesh migrant workers lost their jobs during the COVID-19 pandemic in Bahrain in 2020. 1200 Bangladeshi workers were stuck in Bangladesh following the COVID-19 pandemic and suspension of international flights. There were over 200 thousand Bangladesh migrant workers in Bahrain. In May 2020, the government of Bahrain took steps to provide legal papers to over 40 thousand undocumented Bangladeshi migrants. In May 2021, Bahrain stopped arrivals from Bangladesh during the COVID-19 pandemic as the country had been placed on the "red list".

Md. Nazrul Islam, ambassador of Bangladesh to Bahrain, announced in June 2022, that Bahrain would be again issuing visas to Bangladeshis after a four-year gap. and Bahrain has appointed a new ambassador designate to Bangladesh, Abdulrahman Mohammed AlGaoud.
