= Muhammad Zulqar Nain =

- মুহাম্মদ জুলকার নাইন

Ambassador of Bangladesh to Germany
- Incumbent
- Assumed office 24 March 2025
- President: Mohammed Shahabuddin; Mirza Fakrul Islam Alamgir
- Prime Minister: Muhammad Yunus (as Chief Adviser); Tareq Rahman
- Preceded by: Md Mosharraf Hossain Bhuiyan

Ambassador of Bangladesh to Algeria
- In office December 2020 – February 2025
- President: Abdul Hamid; Mohammed Shahabuddin
- Prime Minister: Sheikh Hasina
- Preceded by: Mohammed Abdul Hye
- Succeeded by: Md. Najmul Huda

Personal details
- Born: 28 November 1967 (age 58) Dhaka, East Pakistan now Bangladesh
- Spouse: Afsana Bulbul
- Education: Bangladesh University of Engineering and Technology; Monash University

Muhammad Zulqar Nain is a Bangladeshi diplomat and the incumbent ambassador of Bangladesh to Germany. He was the Deputy High Commissioner of Bangladesh to the United Kingdom.

== Early life ==
Nain earned his bachelor's degree in engineering from Bangladesh University of Engineering and Technology. He got his master's degree in Diplomacy and Trade from Monash University.

== Career ==
Nain joined the 17th batch of Bangladesh Civil Service as a foreign service cadre in 1986.

Nain was the Director General of Administration at the Ministry of Foreign Affairs.

Nain was appointed the Ambassador of Bangladesh to Algeria in December 2020. He was also accredited as the ambassador of Bangladesh to Mauritania. He previously served as the Deputy High Commissioner of Bangladesh to the United Kingdom.
