= Mehdi Hasan (diplomat) =

Bangladeshi diplomat

Ambassador of Bangladesh to Sweden
- In office March 2022 – March 2025
- Preceded by: Nazmul Islam
- Succeeded by: Wahida Ahmed

Personal details
- Education: Bangladesh University of Engineering and Technology; École nationale d'administration

Mehdi Hasan is a Bangladeshi career diplomat and a former Ambassador of Bangladesh to Sweden.

== Early life and education ==
Hasan earned a Bachelor of Science in Civil Engineering and a Master’s in Water Resource Engineering from the Bangladesh University of Engineering and Technology. He also obtained a diploma (Master’s) in International Relations from the École nationale d'administration.

== Career ==
Hasan is a career foreign service officer belonging to the 17th batch of the Bangladesh Civil Service in the Foreign Affairs cadre. He served as Director General (Administration) at the Ministry of Foreign Affairs.

Hasan served as the Consul General at the Bangladesh Consulate in Hong Kong and as Counsellor at the Bangladesh Embassy in Manama, Bahrain. He also worked at the Bangladesh Missions in Moscow and New Delhi. In March 2022, he was appointed Ambassador of Bangladesh to Sweden, and concurrently accredited as his country's ambassador to Finland. He accompanied the State Minister for Foreign Affairs Md Shahriar Alam to the Oslo Forum in 2023.
