= Mahbub Uz Zaman =

Bangladesh diplomat

- মাহবুব উজ জামান
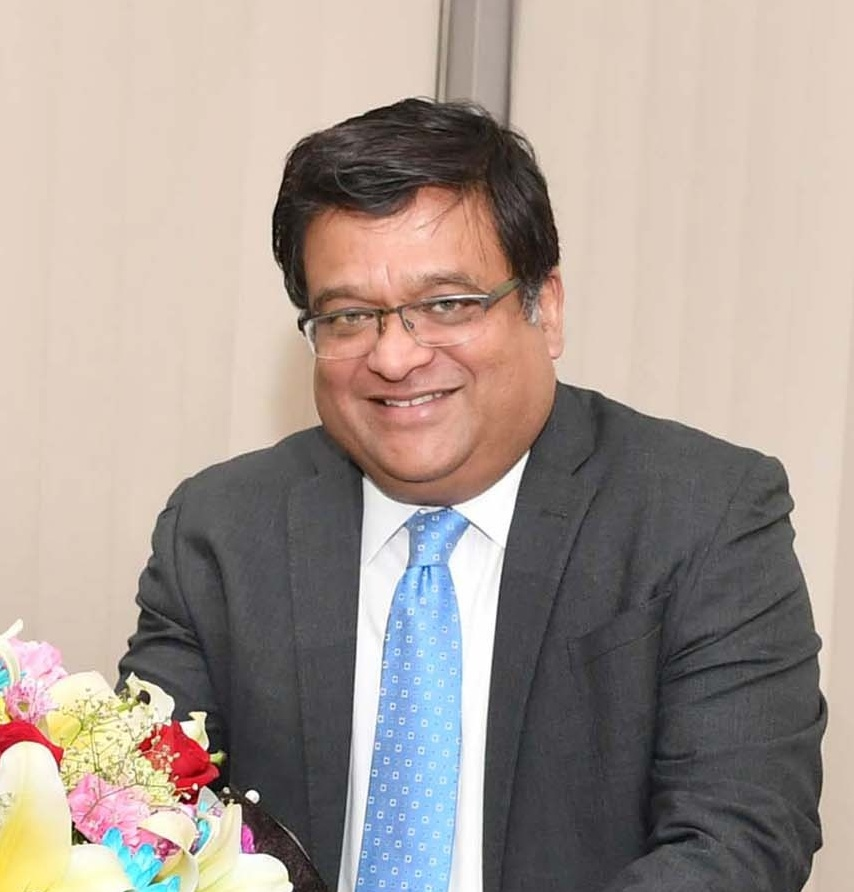
- Zaman in 2018

Ambassador of Bangladesh to China
- In office 21 August 2019 – 5 September 2022
- Preceded by: M. Fazlul Karim
- Succeeded by: Md. Jashim Uddin

High Commissioner of Bangladesh to Singapore
- In office 24 September 2012 – 17 December 2016
- Preceded by: Kamrul Ahsan
- Succeeded by: Mustafizur Rahman

High Commissioner of Bangladesh to Sri Lanka
- In office 30 December 2008 – 16 September 2012
- Preceded by: Md Shahdat Hossain
- Succeeded by: Mohammad Sufiur Rahman

Personal details
- Education: University of Dhaka

Mahbub Uz Zaman ia a Bangladeshi diplomat and former ambassador of Bangladesh to China. He is the former secretary (Asia and Pacific) at the Ministry of Foreign Affairs. He is the former high commissioner of Bangladesh to Sri Lanka and Singapore.

== Early life ==
Mahbub has a master's in economics from the University of Dhaka.

== Career ==
Mahbub joined the Foreign Service cadre of the Bangladesh Civil Service in 1985. He had served in the Permanent Mission of Bangladesh to the United Nations and Permanent Mission of Bangladesh to the United Nations in Vienna.

Mahbub was the director of administration at the Ministry of Foreign Affairs. He was the director of Multilateral Economic Affairs. Mahbub had served in the High Commission of Bangladesh to Canada. He had served in the embassy of Bangladesh in Japan. He was the director general South Asia and South Asian Association for Regional Cooperation at the Ministry of Foreign Affairs in 2006. He was the high commissioner of Bangladesh to Sri Lanka in November 2011.

Mahbub was appointed the high commissioner of Bangladesh to Singapore in 2012. He replaced Kamrul Ahsan. He asked workers in Singapore to remain calm following the 2013 Little India riot. During his term the Zika virus spread to the expatriate Bangladeshi community in Singapore in 2016.

From 2016 to 2019, Mahbub was the secretary in charge of Asia and Pacific region at the Ministry of Foreign Affairs. In August 2017, he met a representative of the government of Myanmar to discuss the influx of Rohingya refugees in Bangladesh.

On 21 August 2019, Mahbub was appointed the ambassador of Bangladesh to China for one year. His appointment was extended by one year in 2020. He was replaced by Md. Jashim Uddin in 2022.

In June 2022, Mahbub hosted the director general of the Department of Asian Affairs who called Bangladesh to reject "cold war mentality" of the United States.
