= Nahida Sobhan =

Bangladeshi diplomat

- নাহিদা সোবহান
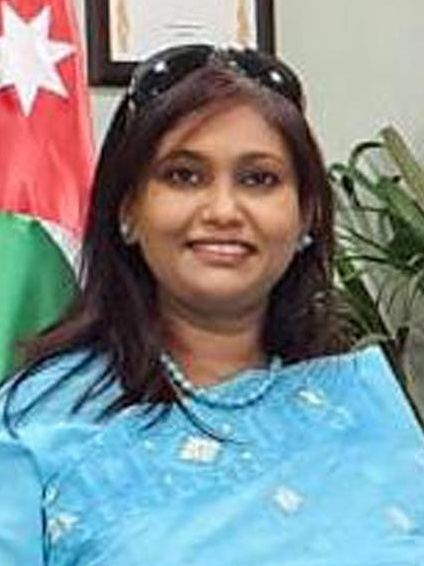
- Sobhan in Jordan (2021)

Ambassador of Bangladesh to Switzerland and Permanent Representative of Bangladesh to the United Nations Office in Geneva
- Incumbent
- Assumed office May 2025
- President: Mohammed Shahabuddin; Hafiz Uddin Ahmad (acting); Mirza Fakhrul Islam Alamgir
- Prime Minister: Muhammad Yunus (as Chief Adviser); Tarique Rahman
- Preceded by: Tareq Md Ariful Islam

High Commissioner of Bangladesh to Canada
- In office 30 May 2024 – May 2025
- Preceded by: Khalilur Rahman
- Succeeded by: Md. Jashim Uddin

Ambassador of Bangladesh to Jordan
- In office 21 February 2020 – August 2024
- Preceded by: Muhammad Enayet Hossain
- Succeeded by: Noor-e-Helal Saifur Rahman

Personal details
- Education: University of Dhaka (MA)

Nahida Sobhan is a Bangladeshi diplomat. She is incumbent ambassador of Bangladesh to Switzerland and the permanent representative of Bangladesh of the United Nations Office at Geneva since May 2025. She became the first female diplomat representing Bangladesh in the Middle East as she became ambassador to Jordan on 21 February 2020. Earlier, she served as the director general of the UN Department in the Ministry of Foreign Affairs.

== Education ==
Sobhan completed her SSC from Agrani Girls' School in 1984 and HSC from Holy Cross College in 1986. She holds a bachelor of arts (honors) and a master's degree in English literature from the University of Dhaka in 1992 and in 1994 respectively.

Sohan was trained in public international law at The Hague Academy of International Law in Netherlands. She also obtained a diploma in international relations from the Institute of Public Administration in Paris, France. She is equally fluent in French, English and Bengali.

== Career ==
Sobhan is a career foreign service officer, belonging to 15th batch of Bangladesh Civil Service (BCS) foreign affairs cadre. She served in various capacities at Bangladesh missions in Rome, Kolkata and Geneva.

Sobhan was the director general of the United Nations wing at the Ministry of Foreign Affairs. She stated that the Murder of Abrar Fahad "was not linked to freedom of expression,” after calling UN Resident Coordinator Mia Seppo.

In February 2020, Sobhan was appointed Ambassador of Bangladesh to Jordan, the first Bangladeshi woman ambassador in the Middle East. She provided aid to the International Committee of Red Cross for earthquake victims in Syria.

Sobhan was appointed Bangladesh High Commissioner to Canada in May 2024 and server until May 2025.

== Personal life ==
Sobhan is married and has a son and a daughter.
