= Ashud Ahmed =

Bangladeshi diplomat

- আশুদ আহমেদ
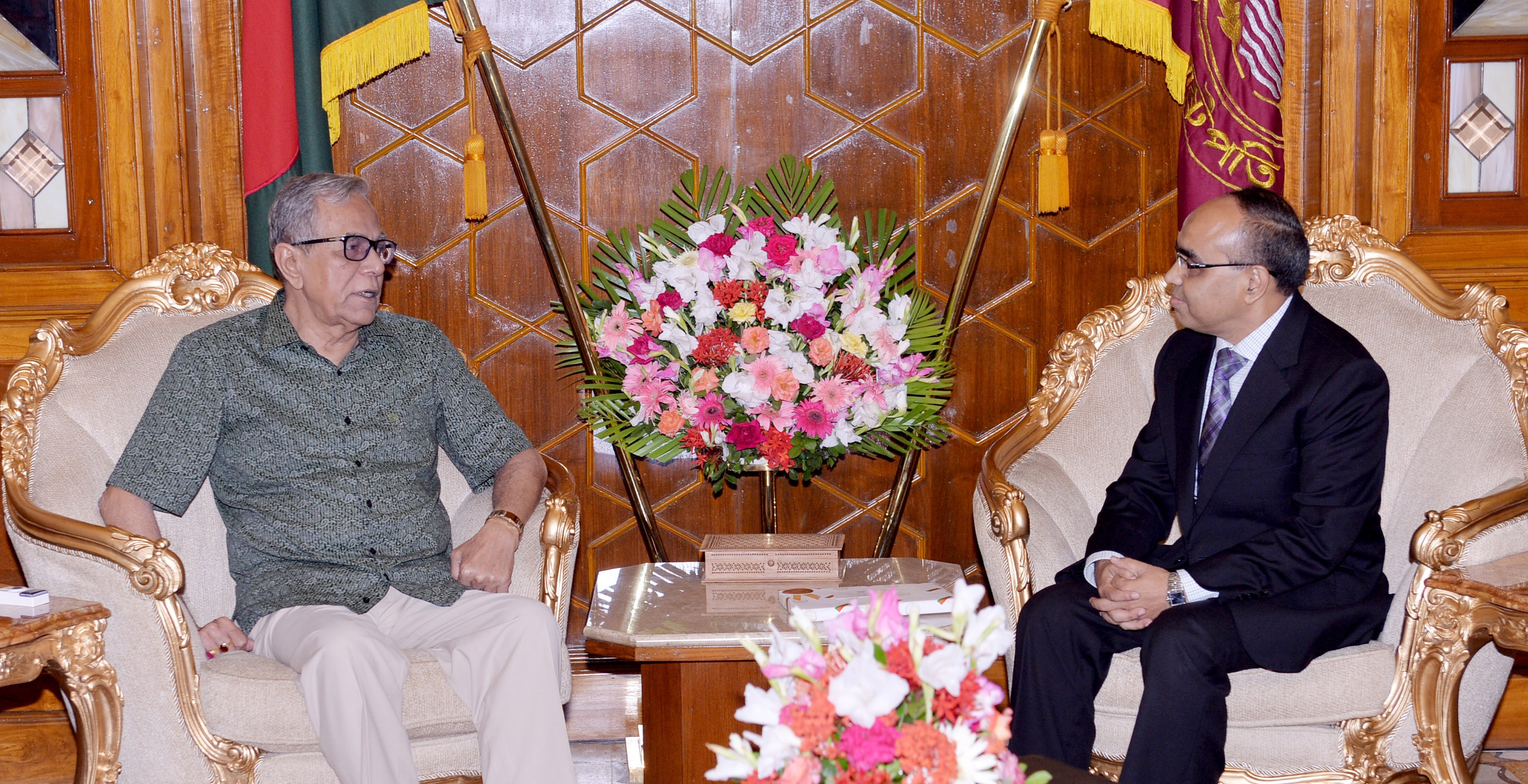
- Ashud Ahmed meeting with President Md. Abdul Hamid at Bangabhaban in Dhaka

Ambassador of Bangladesh to Greece
- In office 3 September 2020 – 31 March 2024
- Preceded by: Md. Jashim Uddin
- Succeeded by: Nahida Rahman Shumona

Ambassador of Bangladesh to Qatar
- In office 25 October 2015 – 26 August 2020
- Preceded by: Syed Masud Mahmood Khundoker
- Succeeded by: Md. Jashim Uddin

Ashud Ahmed is a Bangladeshi diplomat. He is a former ambassador of Bangladesh to Greece and Qatar.

== Early life and education ==
Ahmed completed his master's in International Relations at the University of Dhaka. He received training at the Asia Pacific Centre for Security Studies in 2013.

== Career ==
Ahmed joined the 13th batch of the Bangladesh Civil Service.

Ahmed had served in Bangladeshi diplomatic missions as Deputy Chief of Mission in Brussels, Counsellor in Colombo, Consul General of Bangladesh in Hong Kong, and First Secretary in New York City. He was the Deputy Chief of Protocol at the Ministry of Foreign Affairs. He was also the Director of the Europe Wing and an Assistant Secretary at the Protocol and International Organizations Wings at the Ministry of Foreign Affairs.

In August 2015, Ahmed was appointed Bangladesh's Ambassador to Qatar. On 3 September 2020, He was appointed Ambassador of Bangladesh to Greece, replacing Md. Jashim Uddin. He had concurrent accreditation to Albania. He served till 31 March 2024 and was replaced by Nahida Rahman Shumona.

== Personal life ==
Ahmed was married to Rebekka Sultana.
