= Md Mosharraf Hossain Bhuiyan =

Bangladeshi diplomat

Ambassador of Bangladesh to Germany
- In office 2 October 2020 – September 2024
- Succeeded by: Muhammad Zulqar Nain

Personal details
- Education: University of Dhaka

Md Mosharraf Hossain Bhuiyan is a former ambassador of Bangladesh to Germany. He is a former Chairman of the National Board of Revenue.

== Early life ==
Bhuiyan did his undergrad and masters in Social Sciences at the University of Dhaka. He has a masters in Development Economics from Williams College.

== Career ==
Bhuiyan joined the Bangladesh Civil Service as an Audit and Accounts Cadre on 30 January 1981.

Bhuiyan was appointed secretary of the Bridges Division in the Ministry of Communications in February 2010. He was appointed Chairman of Bangladesh Economic Zones Authority in November 2011. In January 2013, he was suspended after he was arrested in the Padma Bridge graft scandal case.

On 3 January 2018, Bhuiyan became the Senior Secretary of the Internal Resources Division.

Bhuiyan retired as a senior secretary on 3 January 2020.

On 2 October 2020, Bhuiyan was appointed ambassador of Bangladesh to Germany. He was fired after the fall of the Sheikh Hasina led Awami League government.
