= Mohammad Mostafizur Rahman (air officer) =

Officer of Bangladesh air force and diplomat

Ambassador of Bangladesh to Indonesia
- In office 12 November 2020 – 13 April 2023
- Preceded by: Azmal Kabir
- Succeeded by: Md. Tarikul Islam

Military service
- Allegiance: Bangladesh
- Branch/service: Bangladesh Air Force
- Years of service: 1987–2024
- Rank: Air Vice Marshal
- Unit: No 18 Squadron BAF
- Commands: Air Headquarters; Ambassador of Bangladesh to Indonesia; AOC Bangladesh Air Force Base Birsreshto Matiur Rahman, Jashore; Commandant, No 101 Special Flying Unit, BAF; CAAB, Member Ops and AVSEC, Air Headquarters, Director Flight Safety
- Battles/wars: MONUSCO; UNIKOM; Chittagong Hill Tracts conflict

Air Vice Marshal Mohammad Mostafizur Rahman, (GUP, ndc, psc) is a former officer of the Bangladesh Air Force. He was last appointed as Bangladeshi ambassador to the Indonesia before his retirement. Prior to that, he was the Air officer commanding of Bangladesh Air Force Base Birsreshto Matiur Rahman, Jashore.

== Education ==
Mostafizur Rahman was commissioned in the Bangladesh Air Force in 1987. He obtained his bachelor's degree in Aeronautics from Rajshahi University, master's degree in social welfare from Dhaka University and master's degree in security from Bangladesh University of Professionals. He is alumni of Singapore Aviation Academy (Aviation Management) He is now pursuing MBA from Southeast University, Bangladesh.

== Career ==
Rahman was commissioned in 13 GD(P) Course of Bangladesh Air Force in 1987 from Bangladesh Air Force Academy. During his military career, he has served in various commands which includes ambassador of Bangladesh to Indonesia, commandant of 101 Special Flying Unit and AOC BAF Base, Birsheshto Matiur Rahman, Jashore. He served in key roles in UN missions in Congo twice and in Kuwait once.

As of 2026, Mostafizur Rahman is on the board of directors of IDLC Finance PLC.
