= Wahida Ahmed =

Bangladeshi diplomat

- ওয়াহিদা আহমেদ
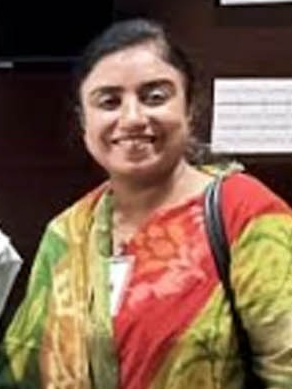
- Ahmed at DAC airport (2023)

Ambassador of Bangladesh to Sweden
- Incumbent
- Assumed office 23 April 2025
- Preceded by: Mehdi Hasan

Personal details
- Education: University of Dhaka

Wahida Ahmed is a Bangladeshi diplomat. She is the incumbent ambassador of Bangladesh to Sweden since April 2025.

== Career ==
Ahmed earned a master's degree in international relations from the University of Dhaka.

Ahmed served in various capacities in Dhaka and Bangladesh Missions in Berlin, Jakarta and Canberra, and as a Deputy High Commissioner in Kuala Lumpur.

Ahmed is a former Director General for economic affairs and international organizations in the headquarters of the Ministry of Foreign Affair and a former Director of the South Asia, Consular and International Organizations Wings in the ministry.
