= Noor-e-Helal Saifur Rahman =

Bangladeshi diplomat

Ambassador of Bangladesh to Jordan
- Incumbent
- Assumed office 25 August 2024
- Preceded by: Nahida Sobhan

High Commissioner of Bangladesh to South Africa
- In office 2020–2024
- Succeeded by: Shah Ahmed Shafi

Personal details
- Education: University of Dhaka; Nanyang Technological University of Singapore

Noor-e-Helal Saifur Rahman is the 8th and incumbent ambassador of Bangladesh to Jordan. He is a former high commissioner of Bangladesh to South Africa. He is the former deputy commissioner of Bangladesh to Pakistan based in Karachi.

== Early life ==
Rahman did his bachelor's and master's in Bengali Literature and Language from the University of Dhaka. He completed an MBA from the Nanyang Technological University.

== Career ==
Rahman joined the Foreign Affairs cadre of Bangladesh Civil Service in the 15th batch (1998). He had served in diplomatic missions of Bangladesh in France, Kuwait, and Singapore.

Rahman was the director general at the Ministry of Foreign Affairs responsible for Africa. He was the director general of External Publicity at the Ministry of Foreign Affairs.

Rahman was the Deputy High Commissioner of Bangladesh in Karachi from 2015 to 2021. He expressed concerns over security after the Chinese consulate in Karachi was bombed by terrorists. In June 2020, Rahman was appointed the high commissioner of Bangladesh to South Africa. In August 2023, he received Prime Minister Sheikh Hasina who had arrived to Johannesburg for the 15th BRICS Summit. He accompanied Shahriar Alam, State Minister of Foreign Affairs, to Eswatini to discuss export of pharmaceuticals.
