= Faiyaz Murshid Kazi =

Bangladeshi diplomat

Ambassador of Bangladesh to the Netherlands
- Incumbent
- Assumed office September 2026
- Preceded by: Tareque Muhammad

Ambassador of Bangladesh to Thailand
- In office September 2024 – September 2026
- Preceded by: Mohammed Abdul Hye
- Succeeded by: Andalib Elias

Personal details
- Education: University of Dhaka

Faiyaz Murshid Kazi is a Bangladeshi diplomat and the incumbent ambassador of Bangladesh to the Netherlands. Prior to this, he was the ambassador to Thailand. He is the former director-general of the West Europe and European Union wing at the Ministry of Foreign Affairs.

== Early life ==
Kazi has a master's in English literature from the University of Dhaka.

== Career ==
Kazi joined the foreign service through the 20th batch of the Bangladesh Civil Service. He served as an assistant commissioner and a magistrate in Chittagong District.

In 2008, Kazi was the first secretary at the Embassy of Bangladesh in China. He was the Deputy Permanent Representative at the Bangladesh Permanent Representative of Bangladesh to the United Nations Office in Geneva.

Kazi was the director-general of the West Europe and European Union wing at the Ministry of Foreign Affairs. He was the director-general of the multilateral economic wing at the Ministry of Foreign Affairs.

Following the fall of the Sheikh Hasina led Awami League government, Kazi was appointed ambassador of Bangladesh to Thailand in September 2024. He accompanied the chief justice of Bangladesh, Syed Refaat Ahmed, during his official trip to Thailand in November 2024. He is a member of the board of trustees of the Asian Institute of Technology.
