= Muhammad Imran (diplomat) =

Bangladesh diplomat

- মুহাম্মদ ইমরান
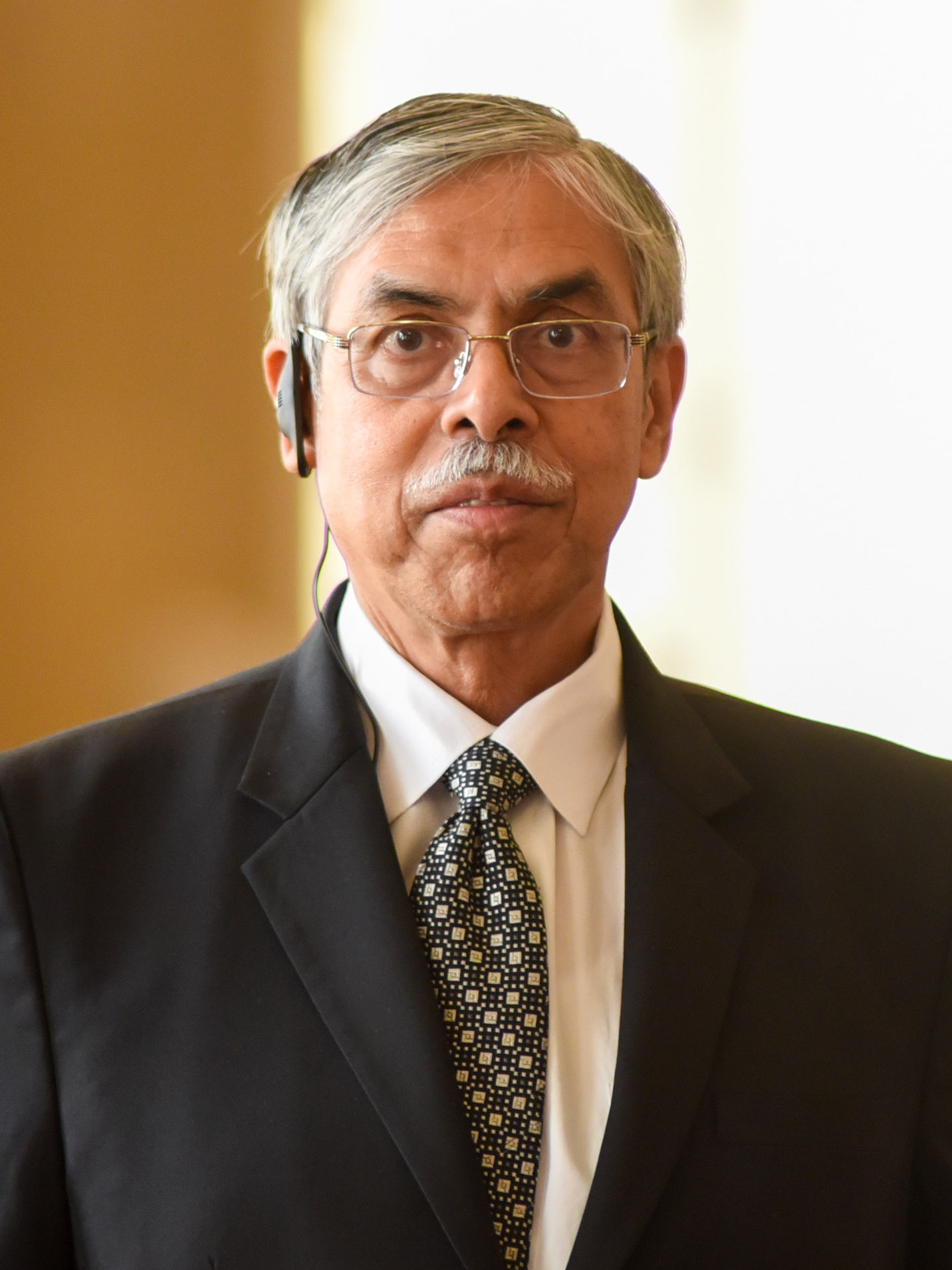
- Imran in 2023

Bangladesh Ambassador to the United States
- In office 15 September 2022 – 15 August 2024
- President: Abdul Hamid; Mohammed Shahabuddin
- Prime Minister: Sheikh Hasina; Muhammad Yunus; (acting)
- Preceded by: M Shahidul Islam
- Succeeded by: Asad Alam Siam

Bangladesh High Commissioner to the India
- In office January 2020 – 13 July 2022
- President: Abdul Hamid
- Preceded by: Syed Muazzem Ali
- Succeeded by: Mustafizur Rahman

Ambassador of Bangladesh to the United Arab Emirates
- In office April 2013 – January 2020

Ambassador of Bangladesh to Uzbekistan
- In office 2010 – April 2013

Personal details
- Born: East Pakistan
- Spouse: Zakia Hasnat Imran
- Children: 2
- Education: Mymensingh Medical College

Muhammad Imran is a Bangladeshi diplomat and was the Ambassador of Bangladesh to the United States. Prior to that, he was the High Commissioner of Bangladesh to India.

== Early life ==
Imran has completed his MBBS from Mymensingh Medical College under the University of Dhaka in 1983. He received further training from Bangladesh Public Administration Training Centre and the Foreign Service Academy in 1989 and 1991.

== Career ==
Imran joined the Bangladesh Civil Service in 1986 as part of the Foreign Service. Imran worked in the Bangladesh High Commission in the late 1990s as a counsellor.

From 2008 to 2010, Imran worked as a Director General at the Ministry of Foreign Affairs. Imran served as the Ambassador of Bangladesh to Uzbekistan from 2010 to 2013.

Imran served as the Ambassador of Bangladesh to the United Arab Emirates until 2019. On 12 November 2019, he was appointed the High Commissioner of Bangladesh to India. On 21 January 2021, he presented his credentials to the President of India, Ram Nath Kovind. He met the Governor of Assam, Jagdish Mukhi, to discuss bilateral ties.
