= Anup Kumar Chakma =

Bangladeshi Major General and diplomat

- অনুপ কুমার চাকমা

Ambassador of Bangladesh to Myanmar
- In office 6 August 2009 – 23 July 2014
- Preceded by: Abu Roshde Rokonuddawla
- Succeeded by: Mohammad Sufiur Rahman

Military service
- Allegiance: Bangladesh
- Branch/service: Bangladesh Army
- Rank: Major General
- Commands: Director at the Directorate of Military Training

Anup Kumar Chakma is a former Bangladesh Army officer and a diplomat. He served as the ambassador of Bangladesh to Myanmar.

== Career ==
Anup Kumar Chakma is a native of Rangamati.

Chakma was promoted from Brigadier General to Major General in December 2005. He was made the Master-General of the Ordnance (MGO) of the army.

While Chakma was the ambassador to Myanmar during 2009–2014, he had often been involved in bilateral meetings regarding the ongoing Rohingya conflict.

Chakma was briefly recalled in January 2012.

In January 2025, Chakma was appointed as the chairman of the Chittagong Hill Tracts Development Board.
