= Mohammad Sufiur Rahman =

Bangladeshi diplomat

- মোহাম্মদ সুফিউর রহমান
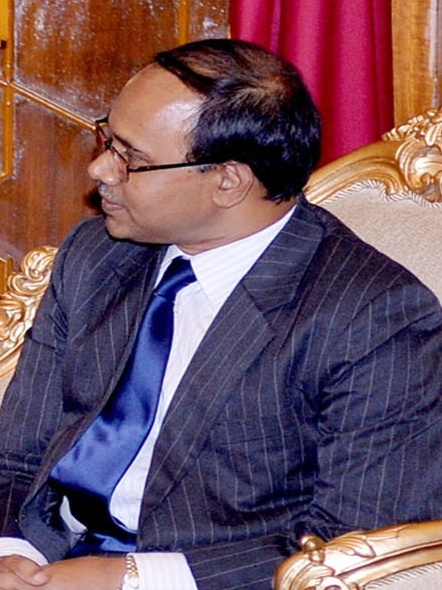
- Rahman in Bangabhaban (2015)

Special Assistant to the Chief Adviser for Ministry of Foreign Affairs
- In office 20 April 2025 – 17 February 2026
- Chief Adviser: Muhammad Yunus

Ambassador of Bangladesh to Switzerland and Permanent Representative of Bangladesh to the United Nations Office in Geneva
- In office 31 July 2022 – March 2024
- Preceded by: Mustafizur Rahman
- Succeeded by: Tareq Md Ariful Islam

High Commissioner of Bangladesh to Australia
- In office 2018 – 31 July 2022
- Succeeded by: M Allama Siddiki

Ambassador of Bangladesh to Myanmar
- In office 16 August 2014 – 27 January 2018
- Preceded by: Anup Kumar Chakma
- Succeeded by: Manjurul Karim Khan Chowdhury

High Commissioner of Bangladesh to Sri Lanka
- In office 27 September 2012 – 8 August 2014
- Preceded by: Mahbub Uz Zaman
- Succeeded by: Tarik Ahsan

Personal details
- Born: 1 December 1964 (age 61)
- Education: Bangladesh University of Engineering and Technology; Institute of Business Administration, University of Dhaka
- Occupation: Diplomat

Mohammad Sufiur Rahman (born 1 December 1964) is a retired Bangladeshi diplomat and former Permanent Representative of Bangladesh to the United Nations Office in Geneva. He is the former ambassador of Bangladesh to Switzerland. He is the former High Commissioner of Bangladesh to Australia. He served as the ambassador of Bangladesh to New Zealand and Fiji. He is the former High Commissioner of Bangladesh to Sri Lanka.

Rahman is a Senior Research Fellow at the South Asian Institute of Policy and Governance of the North South University. He served as the Ambassador of Bangladesh to the Holy See.

== Early life ==
Rahman was born on 1 December 1964. He was completed his undergrad in Civil Engineering from the Bangladesh University of Engineering and Technology. He has an MBA from the Institute of Business Administration, University of Dhaka.

== Career ==
Rahman ninth batch of the Bangladesh Civil Service Foreign Affairs cadre. He has served in the High Commission of Bangladesh, New Delhi and High Commission of Bangladesh, Islamabad. From 1995 to 1999, he was the First Secretary to the High Commission in India.

From 1999 to 2002, Rahman was the counsellor at the Permanent Mission of the United Nations in Geneva.

Rahman was a Director at SAARC Secretariat based in Kathmandu. From 2012 to 2014, he was the High Commissioner of Bangladesh to Sri Lanka. In July 2014, Rahman was appointed Ambassador of Bangladesh to Myanmar. In 2017, he was appointed High Commissioner of Bangladesh to Australia in accreditation to New Zealand and Fiji. Manjurul Karim Khan Chowdhury replaced him as the Ambassador of Bangladesh to Myanmar.

In March 2023, Rahman celebrated the 102nd birthday of former President Sheikh Mujibur Rahman in Australia and told children at the program "to read and know more about this great leader and work hard to build Bangabandhu's Sonar Bangla". He had organized an exhibition on rare photos of President Sheikh Mujibur Rahman at the High Commission of Bangladesh in Australia. He established a Joint Working Group with Australia to develop business ties between the two countries.

M Allama Siddiki replaced him as the High Commissioner of Bangladesh to Australia. He was also the Ambassador of Bangladesh to the Holy See.

Rahman worked as the permanent representative of Bangladesh to the UN Offices in Geneva and the ambassador of Bangladesh to Switzerland from July 2023 until March 2024. He represented Bangladesh at the Global Community Engagement and Resilience Fund.

After the fall of the Sheikh Hasina led Awami League government, Rahman was recalled to Bangladesh.

== Personal life ==
Rahman is married to Shamsia Rahman. They have two daughters and one son.
