= Md Khurshed Alam =

Rear-Admiral in the Bangladesh Navy

Muhammad Khurshed Alam
- মুহাম্মদ খুরশেদ আলম
- Education: Indian Naval Academy; Royal Malaysian Navy; National Defence College
- Military career
- Allegiance: Bangladesh
- Branch: Bangladesh Navy
- Service years: 1975 – 2009
- Rank: Rear Admiral
- Commands: Assistant Chief of Naval Staff (Logistics); Commander, Khulna Naval Area (COMKHUL); Chairman of Mongla Port Authority; Commandant of Bangladesh Naval Academy

Muhammad Khurshed Alam Mphil., ndc, psc, BN is the former secretary (Maritime Affairs Unit) at the Ministry of Foreign Affairs, Bangladesh. He is a former two star admiral of Bangladesh Navy. He also the chairperson of the IOC Regional Committee for the Central Indian Ocean (IOCINDIO). He also served as the president of the International Seabed Authority (ISA) Council.

== Career ==
Alam had received the Indian President's Gold Medal from the Indian Naval Academy in 1974 while an officer cadet.

In 1991, Alam was appointed as the defence adviser in the Bangladesh High Commission in Malaysia. After retirement from the navy, Alam joined at foreign ministry at Maritime Affairs unit on a contractual basis in 2009. Bangladesh filed cases against India and Myanmar in the international court over maritime issues in the same year.

Alam performed the duties of deputy agent and headed the legal team in the "Dispute concerning the delimitation of the maritime boundary between Bangladesh and Myanmar" and the "Bay of Bengal Maritime Boundary Arbitration between Bangladesh and India" in the Peace Palace in The Hague. He was also head of the Bangladesh continental shelf technical team, entrusted with preparations, documentation, the carrying out of a seismic survey in the Bay of Bengal; final submission and presentation to the commission on the limits of the continentals shelf of the United Nations.

Alam writes several books on maritime issues and disputation. Among them, Bangladesh's Maritime Challenges in the 21st century in 2020 and The Boundless Seas, Maritime Developments and its Impacts on Bangladesh in 2004. The foreign ministry awarded Alam with the Bangabandhu Medal for Diplomatic Excellence 2020 for his significant role in the peaceful solution to maritime disputes with neighbouring country Myanmar and India. He got a two-year extension in January 2023.
