= Mohammad Sarwar Mahmood =

Bangladeshi diplomat

- মোহাম্মদ সারওয়ার মাহমুদ

Ambassador of Bangladesh to Philippines
- Incumbent
- Assumed office 17 April 2025
- Preceded by: F. M. Borhan Uddin

Ambassador of Bangladesh to Spain
- In office April 2021 – April 2025
- Preceded by: Hassan Mahmood Khandker
- Succeeded by: Masudur Rahman

Personal details
- Born: 29 April 1969 (age 57)
- Education: University of Dhaka

Mohammad Sarwar Mahmood (born 29 April 1969) is a Bangladeshi diplomat and a former ambassador of Bangladesh to Spain. He worked with election observers in the 2018 general election. He was the Director General of South Asia Wing in the Ministry of Foreign Affairs.

== Early life ==
Mahmood has a bachelor's and master's in economics from the University of Dhaka. He completed an MBA at the Institute of Business Administration, University of Dhaka. He completed the National Defence Course at the National Defence College, Bangladesh.

== Career ==
Mahmood joined the foreign service through the 17th batch of Bangladesh Civil Service. He has served in Bangladeshi embassies in Brussels, and Singapore. From 2010 to 2013, he served at the Permanent Mission of Bangladesh to the United Nations in New York City. He was the Consul General of Bangladesh in Hong Kong from April 2013 to June 2018.

Mahmood is an Asia-Pacific Center for Security Studies fellow. As Director General of the External Publicity Wing of the Ministry of Foreign Affairs, he worked with observers of the 2018 general election. He was the Director General of South Asia of the Ministry of Foreign Affairs.

In February 2021, Mahmood was appointed ambassador of Bangladesh to Spain. He was concurrently accredited to Equatorial Guinea. He has campaigned on returning the Rohingya refugees in Bangladesh. He organized a seminar on Sheikh Russel at the embassy as part of Sheikh Russel Day 2023.

== Personal life ==
Mahmood is married to Farida Akhtar. They have two kids.
