= D. M. Salahuddin Mahmud =

Bangladeshi diplomat

- ডি. এম. সালাহউদ্দিন মাহমুদ

High Commissioner of Bangladesh to Sri Lanka
- Incumbent
- Assumed office August 2026
- Prime Minister: Tarique Rahman
- Preceded by: Andalib Elias

D. M. Salahuddin Mahmud is a Bangladeshi diplomat and the incumbent high commissioner of Bangladesh to Sri Lanka since August 2026. He previously served as the director general (administration) at the Ministry of Foreign Affairs and the chargé d'affaires in Washington, DC.
