= Md. Tarikul Islam =

Ambassador of Bangladesh to Indonesia
- In office 11 December 2023 – 9 July 2026
- Preceded by: Mohammad Mostafizur Rahman
- Succeeded by: Abul Hasan Mridha

Personal details
- Born: Lalmonirhat District

Md. Tarikul Islam is a diplomat and a former ambassador of Bangladesh to Indonesia with concurrent accreditation to ASEAN since December 2023.

== Early life ==
Islam was born in Lalmonirhat District. He completed his bachelor's and master's degrees in English at the University of Dhaka. He has another master's in European Union from the Complutense University of Madrid.

== Career ==
From October 1995 to January 1998, Islam taught English at Khulna University. He joined the 17th batch Bangladesh Civil Service in 1998 as a foreign service cadre. He served as an Assistant Secretary in the Ministry of Foreign Affairs from 1998 to 1999. He was then the Vice Consul/First Secretary at the Bangladesh Consulate General in Dubai, United Arab Emirates from 2002 to 2005. He was the Counsellor (Political) at the Bangladesh Embassy in Madrid, Spain from 2005 to 2008.

Islam was a Director of the Ministry of Foreign Affairs from 2008 to 2011. He was the Counsellor (political) at the Bangladesh Embassy in Tripoli, Libya from 2011 to 2014. He was the Counsellor/Minister at the Bangladesh Embassy in Athens from 2014 to 2016. He was the Director General at the Ministry of Foreign Affairs from 2016 to 2023. He was the Additional Foreign Secretary at the Ministry of Foreign Affairs in 2023.

Islam was appointed the ambassador of Bangladesh to Indonesia in December 2023. He is concurrently the Ambassador of Bangladesh to ASEAN.
