= High Commission of Bangladesh, New Delhi =

Diplomatic Mission of Bangladesh in India

- Address: EP-39, S Radhakrishna Marg, Chanakyapuri, New Delhi, Delhi 110021, India
- Opened: 1972
- Jurisdiction: India, (North India consular service)
- High Commissioner: M. Riaz Hamidullah
- Website: HCB, New Delhi

The High Commission of Bangladesh, New Delhi is the diplomatic mission of the People's Republic of Bangladesh to India. It is headed by the High Commissioner of Bangladesh to India.

== History ==
After forming of Provisional Government of Bangladesh on April 17, 1971. M Hossain Ali Deputy High Commissioner of Pakistan at Calcutta cut ties with Pakistan Government alongside all members working at the deputy high commission and formed Bangladesh's first diplomatic mission in the premises of the Deputy High Commission. A few weeks later, the provisional government of Bangladesh opened a liaison office at New Delhi. India formally recognized Bangladesh on December 6, 1971. Bangladesh government started preparing to move the high commission to Indian capital. And in 1972, Bangladesh government moved the high commission to Chanakyapuri, New Delhi. And the mission at Calcutta became the deputy high commission of Bangladesh at Calcutta.

== Deputy and Assistant High commissions ==
In 1972, the High Commission of Bangladesh, Calcutta became the Deputy High Commission of Bangladesh, Calcutta. After that, a Bangladesh visa office open at Agartala in 1974 which became Assistant High Commission of Bangladesh, Agartala in 2015. Now, Bangladesh maintains three Deputy High Commission and two assistant high Commission in five different cities in India.

City	Current Diplomatic Mission	Location	Jurisdiction	Website
Agartala	Assistant High Commission	near Circuit House, Kunjaban, Agartala, Tripura 799001, India	Tripura/ North East India	AHCB Agartala
Chennai	Deputy High Commission	24/46, Agni Business Centre, 1st & 2nd Floor, KB Dasan Rd, Alwarpet, Chennai, Tamil Nadu 600018, India	South India	DHCB, Chennai
Guwahati	Assistant High Commission	Green Valley Tower Domino’s Old Post Office Lane, Maniram Dewan Rd, near Silpukhuri, Silpukhuri, Guwahati, Assam 781003, India	Assam / North East India	AHCB Guwahati
Kolkata	Deputy High Commission	9, Circus Ave, Bangabandhu Sheikh Mujib Sarani, Kolkata, West Bengal 700017, India	East India	DHCB, Kolkata
Mumbai	Deputy High Commission	Jolly Maker Bungalow.8, opposite World Trade Centre, Cuffe Parade, Mumbai, Maharashtra 400005, India	West India	DHCB, Mumbai

== Anti Bangladesh movement ==
A series of protests had started after Sheikh Hasina fled to India to seek political asylum, following her resignation. The Assistant High Commission at Agartala,Tripura was attacked on December 2, 2024, due to misinformation spread by some Indian media outlets. Following which, Bangladesh Ministry of Foreign Affairs had summoned the Indian High commissioner to Bangladesh and released a press statement stating the violation of Vienna Convention on Diplomatic Relations and withdrew its Assistant High Commission at Agartala resulting in the temporary closure of mission there which, misguided by the media resulted in a larger protest.

In response to the lynching of Dipu Chandra Das, on December 21, 2025, another protest occurred before the High Commission of Bangladesh in New Delhi.

On December 22, 2025, a mob attack occurred at Bangladesh visa center in Siliguri, West Bengal, India. In response, Bangladesh's Ministry of Foreign Affairs suspended all its consular services in India.

On December 23, 2025, a protest occurred in front of Deputy High Commission of Bangladesh in Kolkata. Kolkata Police tried to control the situation and arrested 12 protesters.
