= KM Mominur Rahman =

Bangladeshi military person and diplomat

- কে এম মমিনুর রহমান

Ambassador of Bangladesh to Bahrain
- In office 30 June 2014 – 29 February 2020
- Preceded by: Md. Ali Akbar
- Succeeded by: Md. Nazrul Islam

Military service
- Allegiance: Bangladesh
- Branch/service: Bangladesh Army
- Rank: Major General

KM Mominur Rahman is a retired Major General of Bangladesh Army. He served as an ambassador of Bangladesh to Bahrain during 2014–2020.

== Career ==
KM Mominur Rahman was commissioned in Bangladesh Army in 1980.

Rahman served as the General officer commanding of the 9th Infantry Division until he was transferred to become Quartermaster general of Army Headquarters in September 2012. He then took charge as an executive chairman of Bangladesh Export Processing Zone Authority in November 2012.

Rahman served as a sector commander of Border Guard Bangladesh in Rajshahi.
