= F. M. Borhan Uddin =

Bangladeshi diplomat

- এফ. এম. বোরহান উদ্দিন
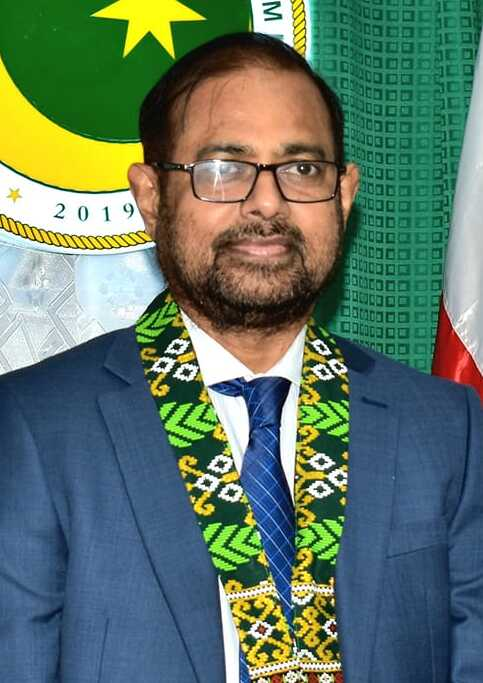
- Uddin in Cotabato City, Philippines (2023)

High Commissioner of Bangladesh to Australia
- Incumbent
- Assumed office 25 March 2025
- President: Mohammed Shahabuddin
- Prime Minister: Muhammad Yunus (acting)
- Preceded by: Mohammad Sufiur Rahman

Ambassador of Bangladesh to Philippines
- In office 3 November 2021 – 17 March 2025
- President: Mohammad Abdul Hamid; Mohammed Shahabuddin
- Prime Minister: Sheikh Hasina; Muhammad Yunus (acting)
- Preceded by: Asad Alam Siam
- Succeeded by: Mohammad Sarwar Mahmood

Personal details
- Born: Terokhada Upazila, Khulna, East Pakistan, Pakistan
- Education: University of Dhaka; University of London

F. M. Borhan Uddin is a Bangladeshi diplomat and the ambassador of Bangladesh to Australia. He is the former ambassador of Bangladesh to the Philippines. He was the coordinator of the Coronavirus Cell, during the COVID-19 pandemic in Bangladesh, at the Ministry of Foreign Affairs.

== Early life and education ==
Borhan Uddin was born in Terokhada Upazila in Khulna district. He completed his master's in sociology in 1991 at the University of Dhaka. He completed a Bachelor of Laws in 2008 at the University of London.

== Career ==
Uddin joined the foreign service branch of the Bangladesh Civil Service in 1995. He began his diplomatic career abroad as a third Secretary and later as a second Secretary at the Bangladesh Mission in Cairo. He then served as first Secretary at the Bangladesh Missions in Seoul and Dubai.

From 2012 to 2015, Uddin was posted at the Bangladesh High Commission in Colombo as counsellor and later minister. He served as consul general at the Bangladesh Consulate General in Istanbul from July 2015 to February 2017, and then as consul general in Jeddah from February 2017 to December 2019. He was the director general of the West Asia Wing at the Ministry of Foreign Affairs and the coordinator of the Corona Cell. From October 2021 to March 2025, he was the ambassador of Bangladesh to the Philippines.

In April 2025, Uddin was appointed as the ambassador of Bangladesh to Australia.
