= Abul Hasan Mridha =

Bangladeshi diplomat

Ambassador of Bangladesh to Indonesia
- Incumbent
- Assumed office 9 Jul 2026
- Preceded by: Md. Tarikul Islam

Abul Hasan Mridha is a diplomat and the incumbent ambassador of Bangladesh to Indonesia with concurrent accreditation to ASEAN since July 2026.

== Career ==
Mridha served as the Director General of the Administration Wing at the Ministry of Foreign Affairs and the Director General of the ministry’s Western Europe and European Union Wing.

Mridha held key positions at Bangladesh missions in Moscow, Muscat, Kolkata and London.
