= Mustafizur Rahman (diplomat) =

Bangladeshi diplomat

- মুস্তাফিজুর রহমান
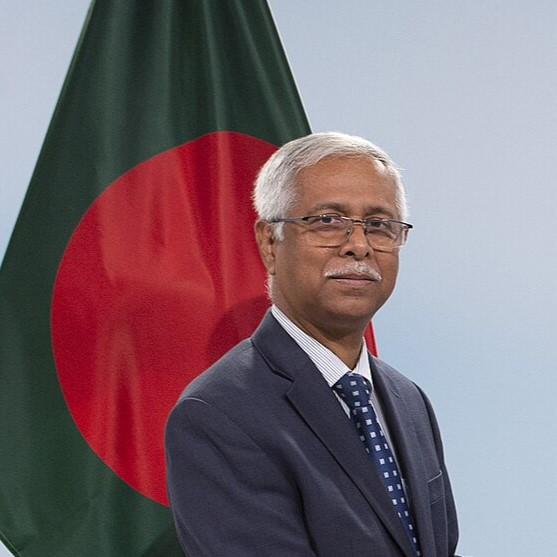
- Rahman in 2022

Bangladesh High Commissioner to the India
- In office 28 November 2022 – 4 October 2024
- President: Abdul Hamid; Mohammed Shahabuddin
- Prime Minister: Sheikh Hasina; Muhammad Yunus (acting)
- Preceded by: Muhammad Imran
- Succeeded by: M. Riaz Hamidullah

Ambassador of Bangladesh to Switzerland and Permanent Representative of Bangladesh to the United Nations Office in Geneva
- In office 2020–2022
- Preceded by: M Shameem Ahsan
- Succeeded by: Mohammad Sufiur Rahman

High commissioner of Bangladesh to Singapore
- In office 26 December 2016 – 7 September 2020
- Preceded by: Mahbub Uz Zaman
- Succeeded by: Md. Tauhedul Islam

Personal details
- Citizenship: Bangladesh
- Education: University of London; Sir Salimullah Medical College

Mustafizur Rahman is a Bangladeshi career diplomat who served as the High Commissioner of Bangladesh to India. Prior to this, he served as the permanent representative of Bangladesh to the United Nations in Geneva, the Ambassador to Switzerland and the High Commissioner to Singapore.

== Education ==
Rahman graduated from Sir Salimullah Medical College, Dhaka. He earned his master's degree in public international law from the University of London and a Post-Graduate Diploma from the Institut international d’administration publique (IIAP), France.

== Career ==
In July 2022, Rahman was appointed the High Commissioner of Bangladesh to India. He had been serving as the Permanent Representative of Bangladesh to the United Nations Offices in Geneva and the ambassador of Bangladesh to Switzerland. He replaced Muhammad Imran, who was appointed the Ambassador of Bangladesh to the United States.

Rahman was recalled by the Government of Bangladesh on 2 October 2024.
