= Md Lutfor Rahman =

- মোঃ লুৎফর রহমান
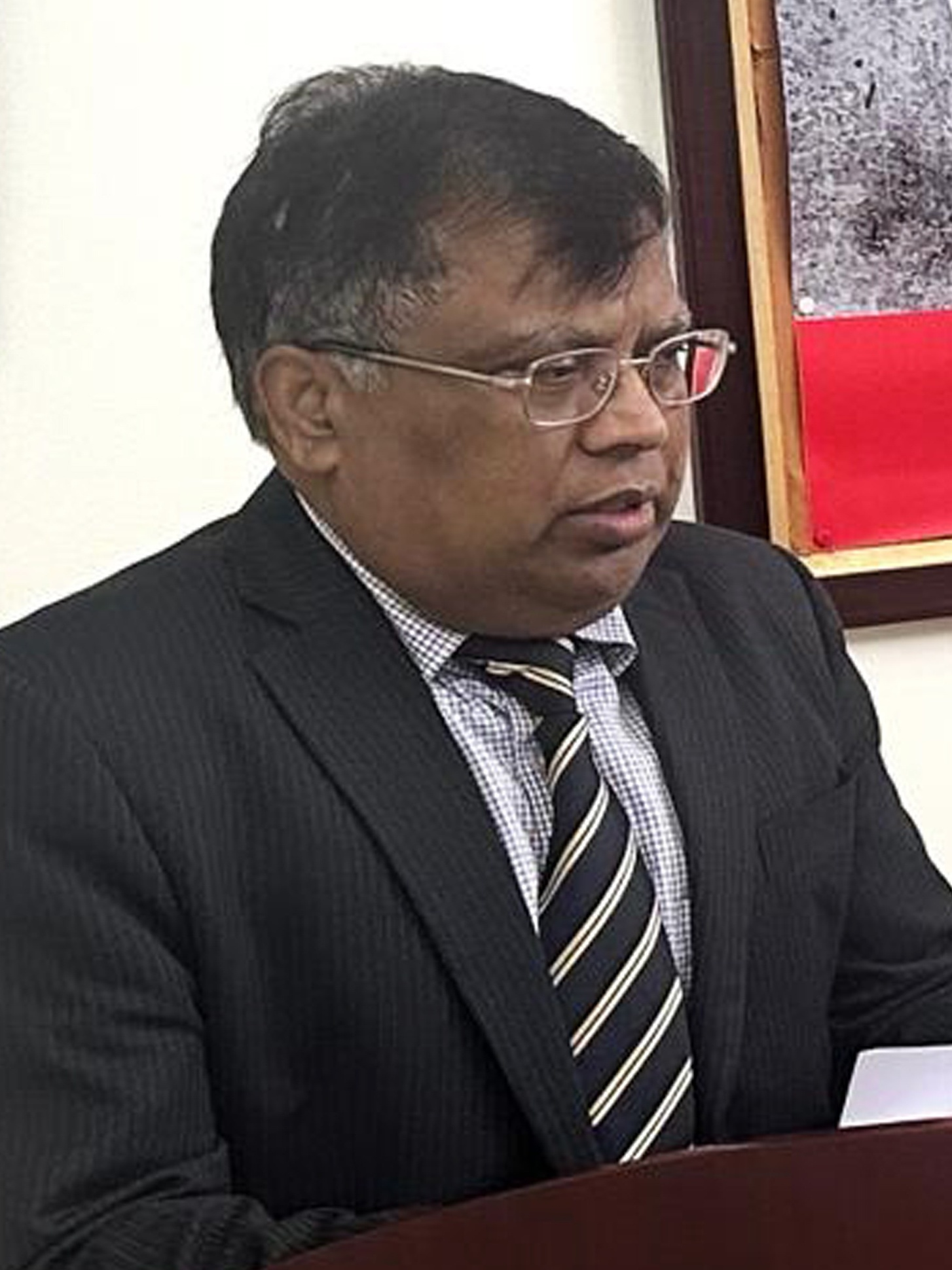
- Rahman in Hanoi (2024)

Ambassador of Bangladesh to Mexico
- Incumbent
- Assumed office September 2026
- Preceded by: Mushfiqul Fazal Ansarey

Ambassador of Bangladesh to Vietnam
- In office 27 December 2023 – 5 September 2026
- Preceded by: Samina Naz

Personal details
- Born: 16 October 1970 (age 56) Thakurgaon, East Pakistan, Pakistan
- Education: Bangladesh University of Engineering and Technology; Stamford University Bangladesh

Md Lutfor Rahman (born 16 October 1970) is a Bangladeshi diplomat and the incumbent ambassador of Bangladesh to Mexico since September 2026. He is a former ambassador of Bangladesh to Vietnam and a former consul general of Bangladesh in Toronto.

== Early life ==
Rahman was born on 16 October 1970 in Thakurgaon District in the then East Pakistan, Pakistan. He graduated from the Bangladesh University of Engineering and Technology in 1995.

== Career ==
Rahman joined the Bangladesh Foreign Service branch of the Bangladesh Civil Service. He worked at the Ministry of Foreign Affairs before being posted to the Embassy of Bangladesh in Vietnam. In September 2004, Rahman was appointed first secretary at the Deputy High Commission of Bangladesh, Karachi.

Rahman became a director at the Ministry of Foreign Affairs in 2007. In April 2009, he joined the embassy of Bangladesh in Saudi Arabia. He was appointed to the embassy of Bangladesh in Morocco. In September 2014, he was promoted to director general and stationed at the Ministry of Foreign Affairs.

In September 2017, Rahman was appointed the deputy high commissioner of Bangladesh to India based in Mumbai. He was appointed the consul general of Bangladesh in Toronto on 11 April 2022.

In July 2023, Rahman was appointed the ambassador of Bangladesh to Vietnam. He replaced Samina Naz.
