= Nahida Rahman Shumona =

Ambassador of Bangladesh to Greece
- Incumbent
- Assumed office 4 September 2024
- Preceded by: Ashud Ahmed

High Commissioner of Bangladesh to Brunei
- In office 30 September 2020 – 3 June 2024
- Preceded by: Mahmud Hussain
- Succeeded by: Naureen Ahsan

Personal details
- Spouse: Aslam Iqbal
- Education: University of Dhaka

Nahida Rahman Shumona is a diplomat and the incumbent ambassador of Bangladesh to Greece. She is a former High commissioner of Bangladesh to Brunei.

== Early life ==
Shumona did her bachelor's and master's in English literature at the University of Dhaka. She did another masters in International Trade and Diplomacy at Monash University. She completed a Trans-boundary Water Law fellowship at the University of Geneva.

== Career ==
Shumona joined the foreign service through the 17th batch of Bangladesh Civil Service. She had served in Bangladeshi embassies in Brazil, Australia, India, and Canada. She served as the Chargé d'Affaires at the Embassy of Bangladesh in Brazil. She served as the Director General of the Consular and Welfare Wing and later the Regional Organisations Wing at the Ministry of Foreign Affairs.

In June 2020, Shumona was appointed High commissioner of Bangladesh to Brunei. She donated books for the establishment of Bangladesh Book Corner at the Universiti Teknologi Brunei. She organised the first ever state visit of Sultan of Brunei to Bangladesh. In 2023, she provided books on Bangladesh to the Principal of Seri Mulia Sarjana International School. She launched e-passport service at the High commission.

In June 2024, Naureen Ahsan was appointed High Commissioner of Bangladesh to Brunei to replace Shumona. She was appointed ambassador of Bangladesh to Greece.

== Personal life ==
Shumona is married to retired Permanent Secretary of the Government of Bangladesh Mr. Aslam Iqbal. They have two sons.
