= Md Rais Hasan Sarower =

Bangladeshi diplomat

Ambassador of Bangladesh to Bahrain
- Incumbent
- Assumed office 18 February 2025
- Preceded by: Md. Nazrul Islam

Md Rais Hasan Sarower is a Bangladeshi diplomat and ambassador of Bangladesh to Bahrain. He was the Director General of the Regional Organizations Wing at the Ministry of Foreign Affairs. He is a former chair of the board of governors of the Asia-Europe Foundation.

== Career ==
Sarower joined the foreign service in 2001.

Sarower, as Charge d’ Affaires of the Embassy of Bangladesh in Malaysia, received the body of Arafat Rahman Koko, son of former Prime Minister Khaleda Zia, in January 2015 and quickly cleared the body for return to Bangladesh. He was the deputy chief of Bangladesh Embassy in Turkey.

Sarower is the vice-chair of the board of governors of the Asia-Europe Foundation. He was the Director General of the Regional Organizations Wing at the Ministry of Foreign Affairs. He attended the 31st Association of South East Asian Nations Regional Forum senior officials' meeting in Vientiane, Laos where he reiterated the foreign policy Bangladesh established by Sheikh Mujibur Rahman, "friendship to all, malice towards none,".

In February 2025, Sarower presented his accreditation to King of Bahrain Hamad bin Isa Al Khalifa. He conveyed a special message from Muhammad Yunus, head of the interim government of Bangladesh.

== Personal life ==
Sarower is married to Dilruba Akhter.
