= AKM Wahiduzzaman =

Bangladeshi academic and diplomat

His Excellency A K M Wahiduzzaman
- এ কে এম ওয়াহিদুজ্জামান
- Wahiduzzaman in 2026

Deputy Permanent Representative of Bangladesh to the United Nations
- Incumbent
- Assumed office 15 July 2026
- President: Mirza Fakhrul Islam Alamgir
- Prime Minister: Tarique Rahman
- Preceded by: Ishrat Ara

Personal details
- Born: 1 January 1970 (age 56) Munshiganj, East Pakistan, Pakistan (now Bangladesh)
- Citizenship: Bangladesh
- Education: Jahangirnagar University
- Profession: Diplomat

Abul Kalam Mohammad Wahiduzzaman is a Bangladeshi academic turned diplomat who has been serving as the Deputy Permanent Representative of Bangladesh to the United Nations in New York since July 2026.

Wahiduzzaman has served as a professor and researcher in geography and environmental studies at Bangladesh's National University. He was known for criticising Sheikh Hasina's government in the early 2010s, which led to criminal proceedings under Bangladesh's information-technology legislation and forced him to leave Bangladesh. Scholars at Risk listed him as an academic at risk of persecution. Wahiduzzaman worked with ANFREL and Forum Asia to uphold democratic values in South and East Asia.

== Education and Personal Life ==
Wahiduzzaman was born to A K M Abdur Rahim and Ashrafun Nesa on January 1, 1970. His ancestral home is in Munshiganj. He attended Bawani High School and completed his higher secondary education at Notre Dame College, Dhaka, by 1988.

He studied Geography and Environment at Jahangirnagar University, earning his BSc in 1992 and his MSc in 1993. He was a Chhatra Dal leader at the university during the Anti-Ershad 1990 uprising and was elected Assistant Sports Secretary of the Jahangirnagar University Central Students’ Union (JUCSU).

== Academic and Professional Career ==
Wahiduzzaman began his professional career in the banking sector as an assistant programmer before moving into academia. He taught geography at Azizul Haque College, Bogura, until April 2004, then joined Dhaka College. In February 2005, he started teaching at the National University, the umbrella institution supervising higher education colleges across the country, where he became an assistant professor. He was promoted to professor in 2026. He served as the general secretary of the National University Teachers’ Association from 2005 to 2006.

Wahiduzzaman also worked with ANFREL, where he observed the 2020 General Elections in Taiwan and co-authored a detailed report on his observations. He wrote a letter to Narendra Modi, with Forum-Asia, urging him to protect the rights of the people in Jammu and Kashmir.

His professional interests include geography, geographical information systems (GIS), remote sensing, environmental management, climate change, and disaster management. He also taught GIS and remote sensing at the postgraduate level at institutions including Jahangirnagar University and the Military Institute of Science and Technology. As an academic, he wrote on environmental issues, waste management, climate change, disaster management, and the challenges of democracy, especially in Bangladesh.

== Persecution and Political Activism ==
Wahiduzzaman has been critical of the Sheikh Hasina regime since the early 2010s and opposed the construction of the coal-fired Rampal Power Station in Rampal Upazila, near the UNESCO-protected site and the Sundarbans mangrove forest. As a geography and environmental science expert, he wrote articles explaining the power plant's adverse effects and joined protests against it.

Since 2013, he has faced continued persecution after a Facebook page named after him posted about the incompetence of Sheikh Hasina and her family members in running the country. He was sent to jail on November 7, 2013, after an Awami League-linked activist filed a case against him for the Facebook post. He remained in jail for more than a month, and in May 2016, he left Bangladesh and lived in Malaysia for almost a decade.

He subsequently joined the Bangladesh Nationalist Party (BNP) and became the party's Climate Change Affairs Secretary in 2016. His portfolio was later changed in 2021 to Information and Communication Secretary.

In September 2020, the National University terminated his employment. University officials stated that this dismissal was prompted by allegations regarding “indecent and highly offensive” comments he made on Facebook about the prime minister and her family. His case garnered attention from several organisations, including Amnesty International, Scholars at Risk, Human Rights Watch, and various Bangladeshi human rights groups. Amnesty International called for his reinstatement, arguing that his dismissal raised significant concerns about freedom of expression and due process. Scholars at Risk also included his case in its list of incidents threatening academic freedom in Bangladesh.

== Diplomatic career ==
Bangladesh government appointed Professor Wahiduzzaman as the Deputy Permanent Representative of Bangladesh to the United Nations in July 2026.

In his new diplomatic role, Wahiduzzaman has represented Bangladesh in meetings of United Nations bodies. In August 2026, he delivered Bangladesh's statement at the second regular session of the executive board of UNDP, UNFPA and UNOPS. He also joined Bangladesh's delegation at the 81st session of the United Nations General Assembly in September 2026.

He joined the Foreign Policy Magazine's signature event, Health Forum @ UNGA81, in September 2026 as a panellist.
