= Shah Ahmed Shafi (diplomat) =

High Commissioner of Bangladesh to South Africa
- Incumbent
- Assumed office 12 September 2024
- Preceded by: Noor-e-Helal Saifur Rahman

Personal details
- Education: University of Dhaka; École nationale d'administration

Shah Ahmed Shafi is a diplomat and the High commissioner of Bangladesh to South Africa. He is the former Director General of the Bangladesh Foreign Service Academy.

== Early life and education ==
Shafi did his master's in sociology at the University of Dhaka. He has a master's in international relations from the École nationale d'administration. He completed a master's in security and strategic studies at the National Defence College.

== Career ==
Shafi joined the 17th batch of the Bangladesh Civil Service in 1998 as a foreign service cadre. He has served in Bangladeshi embassies in Paris, Nairobi, Los Angeles, and New Delhi.

Shafi was the Director General of the Bangladesh Foreign Service Academy. He was the Senior Directing Staff (Foreign Affairs)/ Faculty at the National Defence College. He was the deputy ambassador of Bangladesh to China.

In September 2024, Shafi was appointed High Commissioner of Bangladesh to South Africa. He was the Additional Foreign Secretary at the Ministry of Foreign Affairs in charge of bilateral affairs concerning East European countries and Commonwealth of Independent States (CIS).
