= Chiranjib Sarkar =

Bangladeshi diplomat

- চিরঞ্জীব সরকার

High Commissioner of Bangladesh to Kenya
- Incumbent
- Assumed office June 2025
- Preceded by: Tareque Muhammad

Personal details
- Born: 1 January 1970 (age 56) Barisal, East Pakistan, Pakistan
- Education: University of Dhaka

Chiranjib Sarkar (born 1 January 1970) is a Bangladeshi diplomat. He is the incumbent high commissioner of Bangladesh to Kenya.

== Background ==
Chiranjib Sarkar earned his bachelor's degree in physics from the University of Dhaka in 1989.

== Career ==
Sarkar belonged to the 18th batch of Bangladesh Civil Service (Foreign Affairs).

Sarkar served as the Director General (Ministry of Foreign Affairs) in Dhaka (2016–2019), Deputy High Commissioner of Bangladesh to Canada (2019–2022) and India (2022–2024).

== Personal life ==
Sarkar is married to Anjana Roy and has a daughter, Fiji Sarker and, a son, Atri Sarker.
