= Masudur Rahman (diplomat) =

Bangladeshi diplomat (born 1969)

Ambassador of Bangladesh to Spain
- Incumbent
- Assumed office 10 April 2025
- Preceded by: Mohammad Sarwar Mahmood

High Commissioner of Bangladesh to Nigeria
- In office 10 March 2021 – 8 April 2025
- Preceded by: M. Shameem Ahsan
- Succeeded by: Miah Md Mainul Kabir

Personal details
- Born: 27 December 1969 (age 56)
- Children: 2
- Education: Bangladesh University of Engineering & Technology; Northern University, Bangladesh
- Occupation: Diplomat

Masudur Rahman (born 27 December 1969) is a Bangladeshi diplomat and ambassador of Bangladesh to Spain. He previously served as the High Commissioner of Bangladesh to Nigeria. A career officer of the Bangladesh Foreign Service, Rahman has played a significant role in strengthening bilateral relations, promoting trade and investment opportunities, and representing Bangladesh at key international forums. His diplomatic efforts have served to enhance Bangladesh's international partnerships.

== Early life and education ==
Rahman studied electrical and electronics engineering at the Bangladesh University of Engineering & Technology September 1988 to December 1995. He completed two postgraduate degrees: a Master of Strategy and Development Studies from the Bangladesh University of Professionals and a Master of Business Administration from the Northern University, Bangladesh. He completed a Japanese language course at the Japan Foundation in Osaka from October 1999 to June 2000 and the Advanced Security Studies course at the Asia Pacific Center for Security Studies in Hawaii from January to March 2009. In 2018, he attended the National Defense College course.

== Career ==
Rahman joined the Ministry of Foreign Affairs as a Bangladesh Foreign Service officer on 22 February 1998. His early career included roles as assistant secretary in the West and Central Asia Wing and the Consular and Protocol Wing. His first diplomatic assignment was in Moscow, Russia, where he served as third secretary and second secretary from February 2001 to October 2007. He was later posted to Bahrain as first secretary and counsellor during the same period.

Returning to the Ministry of Foreign Affairs in November 2007, Rahman served as director for the America and Pacific Wing and later as director for the foreign secretary’s office until October 2009. He was the counsellor at the Bangladesh Embassy in Tokyo from November 2009 to July 2013, following his Japanese language training in Osaka.

Rahman moved to the Middle East, serving as consul general of Bangladesh in Dubai and Northern Emirates from July 2013 to October 2015. Back at the Ministry of Foreign Affairs, he served as director general of West and Central Asia, Africa from November 2015 to December 2017. In January 2019, he took on the role of director general of the External Publicity and ICT Wing.

Before his current role, Rahman served as deputy chief of mission and minister at the Bangladesh Embassy in Beijing from 9 October 2019 until he was appointed High Commissioner to Nigeria in March 2021. In 2025, he was appointed the ambassador of Bangladesh to Spain.

During his tenure as Ambassador of Bangladesh to Spain, Masudur Rahman has engaged with Spanish government officials and institutions to strengthen bilateral relations, particularly in trade, investment, migration, and economic cooperation. In June 2025, he visited Seville and met with representatives of the Seville Chamber of Commerce to explore opportunities for commercial collaboration. In August 2026, he met with President of the Spanish Senate Pedro Rollán to discuss bilateral relations, economic cooperation, and parliamentary engagement. He has also participated in diplomatic and cultural initiatives aimed at promoting cooperation between Bangladesh and Spain.

== Personal life ==
Rahman is married and has two children.

Rahman was born in 1969
