= Md. Nazrul Islam (ambassador to Bahrain) =

Bangladeshi diplomat

Ambassador of Bangladesh to Bahrain
- In office 12 March 2020 – 7 September 2023
- Preceded by: KM Mominur Rahman
- Succeeded by: Md Rais Hasan Sarower

Personal details
- Education: University of New England

Md. Nazrul Islam is a Bangladeshi diplomat and senior official in the Ministry of Foreign Affairs (Bangladesh). He previously served as the Ambassador of Bangladesh to Bahrain. As of 2023, he serves as Secretary (East and West) at the Ministry.

== Early life and education ==
Islam earned both his bachelor's and master's degrees in economics from the University of Dhaka. He obtained his PhD in water policy and governance from the University of New England (Australia).

== Career ==
Islam joined the Bangladesh Foreign Service under the Bangladesh Civil Service in 1995.

From 1999 to 2002, he was posted at the Embassy of Bangladesh in South Korea. He later served as First Secretary at the Embassy of Bangladesh in Iraq from 2002 to 2003. Between 2004 and 2006, he served as Director for SAARC and BIMSTEC affairs at the Ministry of Foreign Affairs.

From 2007 to 2010, Islam served as Counsellor at the Bangladesh High Commission in Australia. From 2011 to 2014, he was Director General of Parliamentary Affairs and also oversaw West and Central Asia. In July 2014, he was promoted to Grade-3 officer.

From July 2014 to June 2015, Islam served as the head of the Bangladesh Embassy in Lebanon, succeeding Ambassador AFM Gousal Azam Sarker, who was recalled following allegations of mismanagement.

Between 2015 and 2019, Islam served as Deputy Permanent Representative of Bangladesh to the Organisation of Islamic Cooperation (OIC). Concurrently, from July 2015 to February 2020, he was posted as Deputy Chief of Mission at the Bangladesh Embassy in Saudi Arabia.

From October 2018 to November 2019, he also served as Bangladesh's representative to the Islamic Military Counter Terrorism Coalition. He was subsequently appointed as Ambassador to Bahrain, a position he held until September 2023.

Following his return, he rejoined the Ministry of Foreign Affairs as Additional Foreign Secretary and was later promoted to Secretary (East and West).

== Personal life ==
Islam is married to Najmun Nahar Habib. The couple has three sons.

== See also ==
- Md. Nazrul Islam (ambassador to Ethiopia), a contemporary Bangladeshi diplomat with the same name.
