= Md. Jashim Uddin =

Bangladeshi diplomat

Md Jashim Uddin
- মোঃ জসীম উদ্দিন

High Commissioner of Bangladesh to Canada
- Incumbent
- Assumed office May 2025
- Preceded by: Nahida Sobhan

27th Foreign Secretary of Bangladesh
- In office 8 September 2024 – 23 May 2025
- President: Mohammed Shahabuddin
- Chief Adviser: Muhammad Yunus
- Preceded by: Masud Bin Momen
- Succeeded by: Asad Alam Siam

Ambassador of Bangladesh to China
- In office 5 September 2022 – December 2024
- Preceded by: Mahbub Uz Zaman
- Succeeded by: Nazmul Islam

Ambassador of Bangladesh to Qatar
- In office 4 September 2020 – 6 November 2022
- Preceded by: Ashud Ahmed
- Succeeded by: Md. Nazrul Islam

Ambassador of Bangladesh to Greece
- In office 30 August 2015 – 27 August 2020
- Preceded by: Golam Mohammad
- Succeeded by: Ashud Ahmed

Md. Jashim Uddin is a Bangladeshi diplomat who is the incumbent High Commissioner of Bangladesh to Canada since 2025. He was the foreign secretary of Bangladesh. He previously served as an ambassador of Bangladesh to Greece with concurrent accreditation to Malta and Albania, to Qatar and to China.

== Career ==
Uddin joined the foreign service cadre of the Bangladesh Civil Service in 1994 with the 13th batch. He served as director general (South Asia) and director general (East Asia and Pacific) at the foreign ministry. He also served different Bangladesh missions such as New Delhi, Tokyo, Washington, D.C. and Islamabad in different capacities.

In September 2024, Uddin was appointed the foreign secretary of Bangladesh. In May 2025, he was replaced by Ruhul Alam.
