= Samina Naz =

Bangladeshi diplomat

- সামিনা নাজ

Ambassador of Bangladesh to Egypt
- Incumbent
- Assumed office 23 October 2023
- Preceded by: Md. Monirul Islam

Ambassador of Bangladesh to Vietnam
- In office July 2017 – 2023
- Succeeded by: Md Lutfor Rahman

Samina Naz is a Bangladeshi diplomat and ambassador of Bangladesh to Egypt. She is the former ambassador of Bangladesh to Vietnam and Laos. She is the former Deputy High Commissioner of Bangladesh to India.

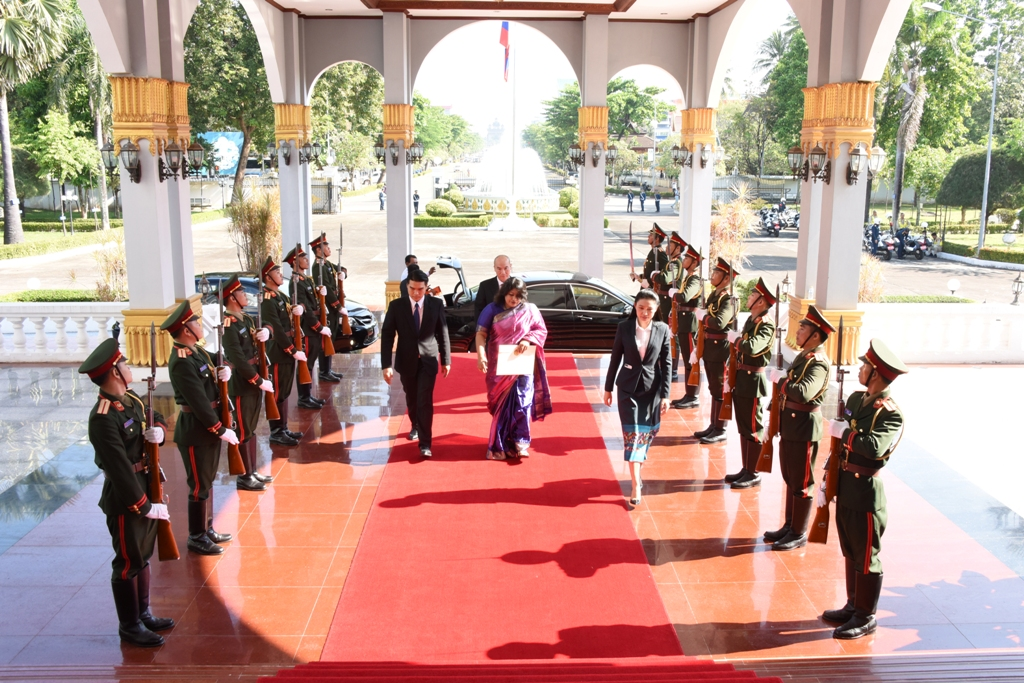
Ambassador Samina Naz being given guard of honour

== Early life ==
Naz did her bachelor's degree and masters in international relations from the University of Dhaka.

== Career ==
Naz joined the foreign service cadre of Bangladesh Civil Service in 1995.

Naz was the Deputy High Commissioner of Bangladesh to India based in Mumbai. She was promoted in July 2014.

In July 2017, she was appointed ambassador of Bangladesh to Vietnam and, concurrently, to Laos. In Vietnam she wrote to the government of Bangladesh on Bangladeshis being trafficked to Vietnam. Md Lutfor Rahman was appointed ambassador of Bangladesh to Vietnam to replace Naz.

In July 2023, Naz was appointed ambassador of Bangladesh to Egypt. She replaced ambassador Md. Monirul Islam in Egypt.
