= Miah Md Mainul Kabir =

Bangladeshi diplomat

- মিয়া মোঃ মাইনুল কবির

High Commissioner of Bangladesh to Nigeria
- Incumbent
- Assumed office 29 July 2025
- Preceded by: Masudur Rahman

Personal details
- Spouse: Nadira Haque
- Education: University of Dhaka

Miah Md Mainul Kabir is a Bangladeshi diplomat. He is the incumbent High Commissioner of Bangladesh to Nigeria since July 2025.

== Background ==
Kabir earned his bachelor's and master's in English Language and Literature from the University of Dhaka.

== Career ==
Kabir joined Bangladesh Civil Service (Foreign Affairs) as Assistant Secretary in 2003.

Kabir served in Bangladesh Missions in Seoul, South Korea (2005–2008), Rome, Italy (2008–2012), Kolkata, India (2013–2018), Ottawa, Canada (2018–2021). He served as the Consul General of Bangladesh in Jeddah, the Kingdom of Saudi Arabia (August 2024 – July 2025).
