= Nazmul Islam (diplomat) =

Diplomat of Bangladesh to China

- নাজমুল ইসলাম

Ambassador of Bangladesh to China
- Incumbent
- Assumed office December 2024
- Preceded by: Md. Jashim Uddin

Ambassador of Bangladesh to Oman
- In office 19 June 2022 – December 2024
- Succeeded by: Khondkar Misbah-ul-Azim

Ambassador of Bangladesh to Sweden
- In office 21 August 2017 – March 2022
- Succeeded by: Mehdi Hasan

Personal details
- Spouse: Nuzhat Nazmul
- Children: 2
- Education: Bangladesh University of Engineering and Technology

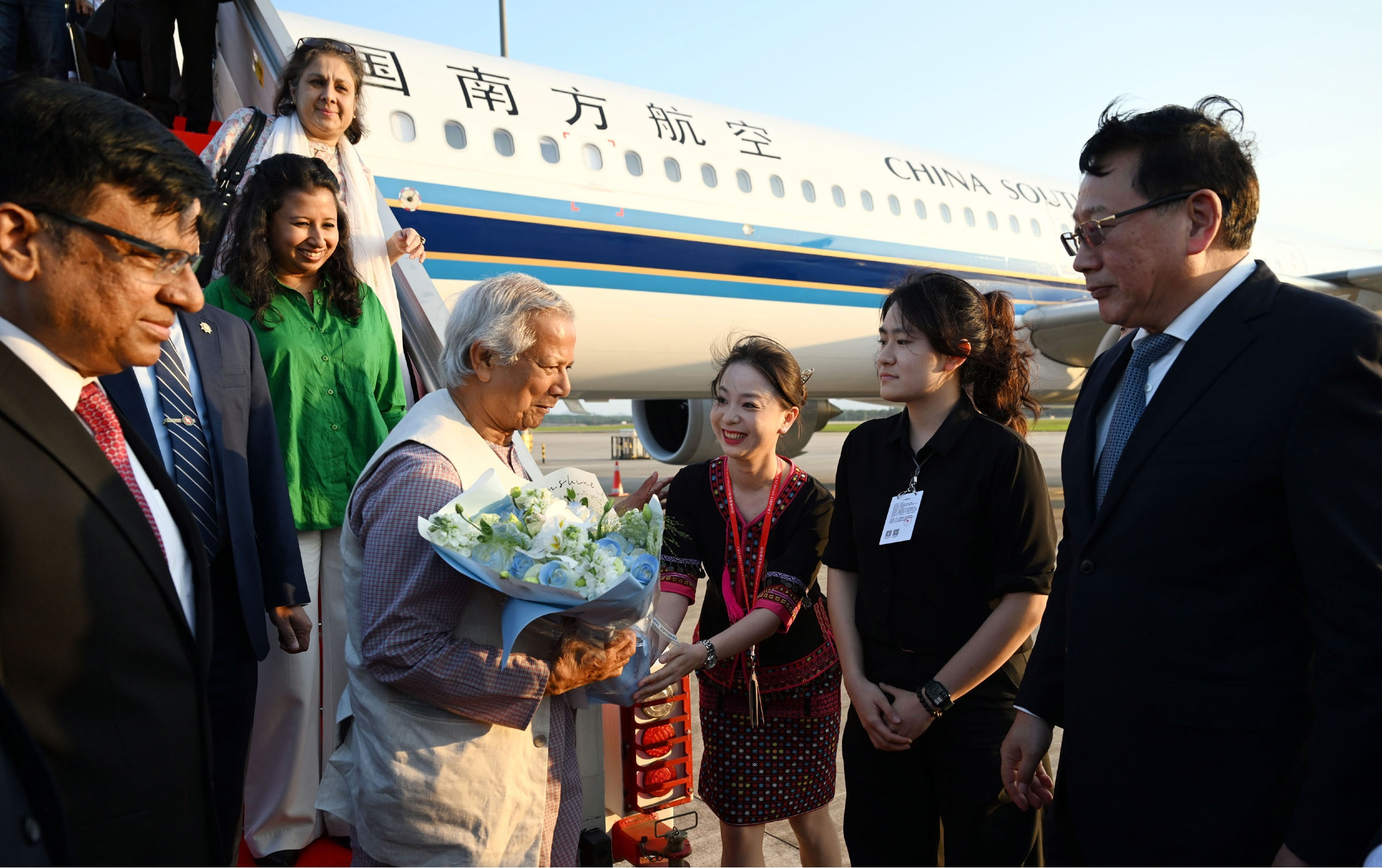
Nazul Islam (left) welcoming Muhammad Yunus to Hainan, China

Md. Nazmul Islam is a diplomat and the incumbent ambassador of Bangladesh to China. Islam was the ambassador of Bangladesh to Sweden (with concurrent accreditation to Norway and Finland) and Oman.

== Early life ==
Islam completed his bachelors in civil engineering at the Bangladesh University of Engineering and Technology.

== Career ==
Islam joined the 15th batch of Bangladesh Civil Service in 1995 as a foreign service cadre. He served as an assistant secretary of the Ministry of Foreign Affairs till 1999. From October 1999 to June 2002, he served as the first secretary of the Bangladesh High Commission in London. From June 2002 to June 2005, he was stationed at the Bangladesh Embassy in Indonesia. He was the Director of the West Asia and Far East wings at the Ministry of Foreign Affairs.

From August 2007 to July 2010, Islam was a counsellor at the Embassy of Bangladesh in China. From August 2010 to June 2014, he was the Consul General of Bangladesh in Jeddah, Saudi Arabia. He was promoted in 2014. From July 2014 to August 2017, he then served as the Director General for West and Central Asia Wing and later administration at the Ministry of Foreign Affairs. In August 2017, he was appointed ambassador of Bangladesh to Sweden, with concurrent accreditation to Norway and Finland. In March 2022, he was appointed ambassador of Bangladesh to Oman while Mehdi Hasan replaced him as the ambassador of Bangladesh to Sweden.

Following the fall of the Sheikh Hasina led Awami League government, Islam was appointed ambassador of Bangladesh to China in December 2024. He received chief advisor Muhammad Yunus of the Interim government of Bangladesh in Hainan in March 2025 who arrived to attend the Boao Forum for Asia.

== Personal life ==
Islam is married to Nuzhat Nazmul. They have two children.
