= Naureen Ahsan =

Bangladeshi diplomat

High Commissioner of Bangladesh to Brunei
- Incumbent
- Assumed office 6 September 2024
- Preceded by: Nahida Rahman Shumona

Personal details
- Born: Dhaka, Bangladesh
- Education: University of Dhaka; University of Pretoria

Naureen Ahsan is a Bangladeshi diplomat and the current High Commissioner of Bangladesh to Brunei.

== Early life and education ==
Ahsan hails from Dhaka, Bangladesh. She completed her undergraduate and postgraduate studies in Zoology at the University of Dhaka. She obtained a Master of Arts degree with a specialization in Environmental Politics and Diplomacy from the University of Pretoria in South Africa.

== Career ==
Ahsan began her career in the Bangladesh Foreign Service in 1995. She was part of the 15th batch of the Bangladesh Civil Service. Throughout her service, she has represented Bangladesh in various capacities in diplomatic missions around the world, including postings in Pretoria, The Hague, and Ottawa.

Within the Ministry of Foreign Affairs in Dhaka, Ahsan has held several important roles. Most recently, she served as Director General of the Research Wing, where she oversaw strategic analysis and policy development efforts. Her experience also includes a brief deputation as Director at the Bangladesh Investment Development Authority.

In June 2024, the Government of Bangladesh appointed Ahsan as the High Commissioner to Brunei, succeeding Nahida Rahman Shumona.
