= Md. Najmul Huda =

Bangladeshi diplomat

- মোঃ নাজমুল হুদা

Ambassador of Bangladesh to Algeria
- Incumbent
- Assumed office 29 May 2025
- Preceded by: Muhammad Zulqar Nain

Personal details
- Education: University of Chittagong

Md. Najmul Huda is a Bangladeshi diplomat and the incumbent ambassador of Bangladesh to Algeria since May 2025.

== Background ==
Md. Najmul Huda earned his bachelor's and master's in English literature from the University of Chittagong.

Huda belonged to the 21st batch of Bangladesh Civil Service (Foreign Affairs Cadre). On 25 May 2003, he joined the Ministry of Foreign Affairs as an Assistant Secretary.
