= Permanent Representative of Bangladesh to the United Nations Office in Geneva =

- Seal of the Government of Bangladesh
- Address: Rue de Lausanne 65, 1202 Geneva, Switzerland
- Coordinates: 46°12′55″N 6°8′48″E
- Opened: 1972
- Ambassador: Nahida Sobhan
- Jurisdiction: UN Office, Geneva, International Organizations located in Geneva, Switzerland, & Holy See
- Website: Permanent Mission, Geneva

Permanent Representative of Bangladesh to the United Nations Office in Geneva is the head of the Permanent Mission of Bangladesh to the UN Office and other International Organizations in Geneva. The representative is also work as an ambassador of Bangladesh to Switzerland and Holy See

== History ==
In 1975, after the Assassination of Sheikh Mujibur Rahman in the 15 August 1975 Bangladeshi coup d'état, Shah AMS Kibria, was appointed the Permanent Representative of Bangladesh to the United Nations Office in Geneva.

Debapriya Bhattacharya was appointed the Permanent Representative of Bangladesh to the United Nations Office in Geneva in September 2007 by the Fakruddin Ahmed led Caretaker government. In December 2008, Bhattacharya resigned from the post of Permanent Representative. Ismat Jahan was appointed the Permanent Representative of Bangladesh to the United Nations Office in Geneva and served till June 2009 when she was appointed the Ambassador of Bangladesh to Belgium.

Permanent Representative of Bangladesh to the United Nations Office in Geneva, Md Abdul Hannan, was elected the chair of International Organisation for Migration in November 2012.

Md Mustafizur Rahman was appointed the Permanent Representative of Bangladesh to the United Nations Office in Geneva in May 2020. Rahman was appointed the High Commissioner of Bangladesh to India in July 2022. Rahman signed the Marrakesh Treaty to the World Intellectual Property Organization on behalf of Bangladesh.

In June 2024, Tareq Md Ariful Islam was appointed the Permanent Representative of Bangladesh to the United Nations Office in Geneva. He was also accredited as the Ambassador of Bangladesh to Switzerland and was previously the High Commissioner of Bangladesh to Australia.

== Officeholders ==
Officeholder	Portrait	Appointment	Presentation	Termination	Appointer	Notes
Shameem Ahsan		2014	29 September 2014	2020	Abdul Hamid	Served during Abdul Hamid's first presidential term
Mustafizur Rahman		2020	28 September 2020	2022	Abdul Hamid	Appointed during Abdul Hamid's second term
Mohammad Sufiur Rahman		2022	7 November 2022	August 2024	Abdul Hamid	Final Geneva appointment under Abdul Hamid
Tareq Md Ariful Islam		June 2024	7 August 2024	May 2025	Mohammed Shahabuddin	
Nahida Sobhan		May 2025	1 October 2025	present	Mohammed Shahabuddin	
