= Permanent Mission of Bangladesh to the United Nations =

Diplomatic mission of Bangladesh

Permanent Mission of Bangladesh to the United Nations, New York
- Location: Diplomat Centre, 820 2nd Avenue, 4th Floor, New York, New York 10017, U.S.
- Coordinates: 40.7508°N 73.9711°W
- Opened: 1972; 54 years ago
- Jurisdiction: United Nations
- Permanent representative: Muhammad Abdul Muhith (since 2022)
- Website: nypm.mofa.gov.bd

The Permanent Mission of Bangladesh to the United Nations, New York is the diplomatic mission of Bangladesh to the United Nations in New York City.

Since August 2026 Irene Khan is serving as the Permanent representative of Bangladesh.

== Former representatives ==
Ambassador Rabab Fatima was the Permanent Representative of Bangladesh to the UN from 6 December 2019. She replaced Ambassador Masud Bin Momen who had been in this position since 3 November 2015. Prior to Ambassador Masud Bin Momen, Dr. AK Abdul Momen was the Permanent Representative of Bangladesh to the UN from 2009 to 2015 . The mission observed Pahela Baishakh, Bengali New Year, in 2018 at its headquarters in New York City.

== Key personnel ==
- Ambassador & Permanent Representative: Irene Khan
- Ambassador & Deputy Permanent Representative: AKM Wahiduzzaman
