= Ministry of Foreign Affairs (Bangladesh) =

Government ministry of Bangladesh

- পররাষ্ট্র মন্ত্রণালয়
- Government Seal of Bangladesh

Ministry overview
- Formed: 14 April 1971; 55 years ago
- Jurisdiction: Government of Bangladesh
- Headquarters: Segunbagicha, Dhaka, Bangladesh
- Annual budget: ৳1844 crore (US$150 million) (2026-2027)
- Minister responsible: Khalilur Rahman, Minister of Foreign Affairs
- Minister of State responsible: Humaiun Kobir, Minister of State for Foreign Affairs-1; Shama Obaed, Minister of State for Foreign Affairs-2
- Ministry executives: Asad Alam Siam, Secretary; Rear Admiral Md Khurshed Alam, Secretary (MAU); Mahbub Uz Zaman, Secretary for Asia-Pacific region; Kamrul Ahsan, Secretary for Europe, Africa and Americas; Md. Nazrul Islam, Additional Foreign Secretary
- Website: mofa.gov.bd

The Ministry of Foreign Affairs (Bengali: পররাষ্ট্র মন্ত্রণালয়, romanized: Porôstrô Montronaloy; abbreviated as MOFA) is a ministry of the government of Bangladesh responsible for formulating and implementing the country's foreign policy. It oversees diplomatic missions, international relations, consular services, and multilateral cooperation.

== Fundamental foreign policy of Bangladesh ==
The State shall base its international relations on the principles of respect for national sovereignty and equality, non-interference in the internal affairs of other countries, peaceful settlements of international disputes, and respect for international law and the principles enunciated in the United Nations Charter, and on the basis of those principles shall;

- Strive for the renunciation of the use of force in international relations and for general and complete disarmament;
- Uphold the right of every people freely to determine and build up its own social, economic, and political system by ways and means of its own free choice; and
- Support oppressed peoples throughout the world waging a just struggle against imperialism, colonialism, or racialism.
