= High Commission of Bangladesh, Islamabad =

Diplomatic mission of Bangladesh

- Location: Islamabad, Islamabad Capital Territory, Pakistan
- Address: House No. 1, Street No. 5, Sector F-6/3
- Coordinates: 33°44′10.6″N 73°4′30.0″E
- Opened: 3 January 1976
- High Commissioner: Iqbal Hussain Khan
- Website: islamabad.mofa.gov.bd

The High Commission of Bangladesh, Islamabad is the diplomatic mission of Bangladesh to Pakistan. It is located in Sector F-6 of Islamabad. Iqbal Hussain Khan has been the Bangladeshi High Commissioner to Pakistan since December 2024. Bangladesh also has a Deputy High Commission in Karachi, and an honorary consul in Lahore.

== History ==
Relations between Pakistan and Bangladesh are historically significant due to the fact that from 1947 to 1971, Bangladesh was part of Pakistan, formerly as East Bengal province and later as East Pakistan.

Following Bangladesh's secession, Pakistan eventually recognised Bangladesh in February 1974 and diplomatic relations were established. In January 1976, both countries exchanged their envoys for the first time and the Bangladeshi embassy in Islamabad became functional. Initially, the embassy was operated from a "cluttered, four‐room hotel suite" in the neighbouring city of Rawalpindi, where Bangladesh's first envoy Zahiruddin had set up a temporary base, before moving to its permanent location. In 1989, the embassy became a High Commission following Pakistan's rejoining of the Commonwealth after leaving in 1972.

In December 2013, the High Commission received threats of an attack after the Bangladeshi government executed Abdul Quader Molla for his alleged role in the 1971 war, a sentence that was condemned by Pakistan. As a result, security was strengthened around the mission. In October 2014, security measures were renewed at both the High Commission and the Deputy High Commission in Karachi as similar threats were received once again. In January 2016, Pakistan expelled Maushumi Rahman, a political counsellor based at the Bangladeshi High Commission, amidst a diplomatic row as Bangladesh executed more political opposition leaders on war crime allegations. The Pakistani move was reportedly pre-empted by Bangladeshi allegations made against Farina Arshad, a diplomat posted at Pakistan's High Commission in Dhaka, whom Bangladesh accused of "spying" and who Pakistan subsequently withdrew on the pretext of "harassment". In May 2019, it was reported that the High Commission's visa operations were being affected as Bangladesh's newly-appointed visa officer was facing paperwork delays from Pakistani authorities.

As of 2021, the Bangladeshi government has purchased five acres of land in the Diplomatic Enclave to inaugurate a new High Commission complex, which is under construction. The new building has been designed by the Bangladeshi architecture firm Shatotto, and is noted to be inspired by the "greenery and wet environment of Bangladesh together with the verticality of the Margalla Hills". The architectural elements and themes used in the design draw upon those used in the ancient Indus and Bengali civilisations, thus presenting a "meeting ground for two civilizations" and reflecting the common past of both countries.

== High Commissioners ==
Iqbal Hussain Khan is the 15th and current Bangladeshi High Commissioner to Pakistan. He presented his credentials to the president of Pakistan on 24 December 2024.

== Operations ==
The Bangladeshi High Commission's primary aim is to enhance the political, economic and defence cooperation between Pakistan and Bangladesh. It also provides consular services to Bengalis in Pakistan, and the issuance of Bangladeshi visas. The High Commission's operating hours are from 9 am to 5 pm (PST) on weekdays. The mission is organised into the following sections, each headed by an officer working under the High Commissioner:

- Political Wing
  - Khadiza Akhter – First Secretary
- Defence Wing
  - Brig. Gen. Abu Rubel Md Shahabuddin – Defence Attaché
- Consular Wing
  - Sardar Mohammed Nomanuzzaman – Counsellor
- Press Wing
  - Md. Tayab Ali – Counsellor

== See also ==
- High Commission of Pakistan, Dhaka
- Bangladesh–Pakistan relations
- High Commissioners of Bangladesh to Pakistan
- Deputy High Commission of Bangladesh, Karachi
