= Afrasiab Mehdi Hashmi =

Pakistani diplomat and author

His Excellency Afrasiab Mehdi Hashmi
- افراسیاب مہدی ہاشمی
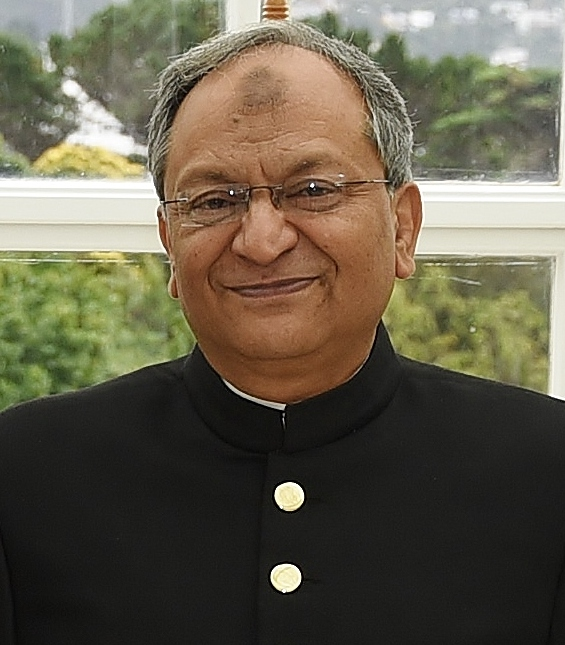
- Hashmi in 2016

High Commissioner of Pakistan to Bangladesh
- In office October 2011 – October 2014
- President: Asif Ali Zardari; Mamnoon Hussain
- Prime Minister: Yousaf Raza Gillani; Raja Pervaiz Ashraf; Mir Hazar Khan Khoso (caretaker); Nawaz Sharif
- Preceded by: Ashraf Qureshi
- Succeeded by: Shuja Alam

High Commissioner of Pakistan to New Zealand
- In office June 2016 – October 2017
- President: Mamnoon Hussain
- Prime Minister: Nawaz Sharif; Shahid Khaqan Abbasi
- Preceded by: Zehra Akbari
- Succeeded by: Abdul Malik

Personal details
- Born: Mian Afrasiab Mehdi Hashmi Qureshi Muzaffargarh District, Punjab, Pakistan
- Spouse: Asia Afrasiab
- Education: Government College University
- Occupation: Diplomat, author

Afrasiab Mehdi Hashmi (Urdu: افراسیاب مہدی ہاشمی) is a Pakistani diplomat and author. He served as Pakistan's High Commissioner to Bangladesh from 2011 to 2014, and as High Commissioner to New Zealand from 2016 to 2017.

== Early life ==
Hashmi was born in Muzaffargarh District, near Multan in southern Punjab and received his education from the Government College in Lahore. He is married to Asia Afrasiab.

== Career ==
Hashmi joined the Foreign Service of Pakistan in 1984. During his early years, he was posted at the Pakistani mission to the United Nations in New York; at Pakistan's embassy in Washington, D.C. from 1987 to 1991 as third secretary; at the Pakistani High Commission in New Delhi from 1994 to 1997 as first secretary; and at the Pakistani embassy in Vienna from 1997 to 2000 as first secretary, where he was also his country's Alternative Permanent Representative to the International Atomic Energy Agency (IAEA). From 2003 to 2006, he was a minister at the Pakistani embassy in Beijing and from 2006 to 2009, he served as Pakistan's Deputy High Commissioner to India. He also worked at the Ministry of Foreign Affairs in Islamabad as director for the Americas region, director-general for South Asia where he specialised on Indian affairs, and as staff officer for the Secretary-General of Foreign Affairs.

As a diplomat, Hashmi is known for his "razor sharp memory" and his knack for predicting future events. He is also reportedly famed for his uncanny ability to read faces and predict what people are thinking. Due to this ability, he was part of a Pakistani delegation sent to New Delhi in February 2010 to hold Foreign Secretary-level talks. He was additionally sent by the Foreign Office to receive India's foreign secretary Nirupama Rao in Pakistan during her visit in June, in an attempt to find out what was on her mind.

=== High Commissioner ===
From 18 October 2011 to mid-October 2014, Hashmi served as Pakistan's High Commissioner to Bangladesh, with concurrent accreditation to Bhutan. As high commissioner, he engaged with the Bangladeshi leadership and advocated greater people-to-people ties between the two countries to improve relations, while the Bangladeshi side called for resolving all outstanding issues from the past including a "formal apology" for 1971 to "enable the existing friendly relations between Bangladesh and Pakistan to make a great leap forward and create a wider space for cooperation". During his tenure in late 2013, diplomatic relations became strained when Bangladesh moved to convict and execute Jamaat-e-Islami leader Abdul Quader Molla on allegations of war crimes, a decision which was roundly condemned by Pakistan as "judicial murder". From October 2014 to April 2016, he took over as the Additional Foreign Secretary for Asia-Pacific in the Ministry of Foreign Affairs.

Later in 2016, Hashmi was appointed as Pakistan's High Commissioner to New Zealand, with concurrent diplomatic accreditation to Samoa, Tonga and Kiribati. He assumed charge of the mission on 29 April 2016, however presented his credentials on 1 June 2016 at Wellington's Government House and held the post until October 2017. He discharged various diplomatic duties while in office, and also played a key role in strengthening Pakistan's relations with Samoa, as one of his country's first envoys to the island nation. In early 2017, he was considered as one of the nominees for the post of High Commissioner to India.

== Bibliography ==
Books written by Hashmi include:

- U.S. Relations with South Asia since Christopher Columbus and Pakistan–India Interaction (1492–2002). Afrasiab. 2002.
- An Encyclopaedia of Dates, Quotes and Documents on Pakistan, India, China, and the United States, and Their Relations: 7000 B.C. to 2013 A.D. Bangladesh Defence Journal Publishing. 2013. ISBN 978-969-9837-00-5.
- Ancient and Contemporary Pakistan. Makhdooms. 2015. ISBN 978-969-9837-02-9.
- 1971 Fact and Fiction: Views and Perceptions in Pakistan, India and Bangladesh. Khursheed Printers Pvt. Limited. 2016. ISBN 978-969-9837-03-6.
- The Greatest Man in History is Muhammad. Jellyman New Zealand Paperback. 2017. ISBN 978-969-9837-04-3.

=== 1971 Fact and Fiction ===
In his book 1971 Fact and Fiction: Views and Perceptions in Pakistan, India and Bangladesh, Hashmi writes about the political events and circumstances surrounding the East Pakistan conflict of 1971. According to Hashmi, Sheikh Mujibur Rahman had never originally intended for Bangladesh to secede; instead, he had leveraged it as a means to "raise the threshold" with Islamabad and acquiesce President Yahya Khan to agree to his demands – however, the situation reached a "point of no return." He also writes that former President Ayub Khan and Prime Minister Zulfikar Ali Bhutto both knew as far back as 1966 that "it was not really possible for East Pakistan to remain part of Pakistan for long".

After the war ended, Chinese premier Zhou Enlai reportedly said to Bhutto: "Do not worry... take a long-term view, who knows what is going to happen in the subcontinent 50 years from now, 70 years from now, 100 years from now!".

After Pakistan recognised Bangladesh and Sheikh Mujibur Rahman visited Lahore in 1974 to attend the Second Islamic Summit, Bhutto and Mujib had an exchange wherein the former remarked "You are helpless! You cannot take any decision without the approval of Indira Gandhi!" and the latter said "Bhutto sahib, do not insult me... you know too well, whatever happened was because of you!".

Hashmi notes that many of the main characters involved in the 1971 debacle had tragic fates, including Sheikh Mujibur Rahman himself on 15 August 1975, the four key Awami League leaders killed in Dhaka Central Jail in November 1975, Bangladeshi General Ziaur Rahman, as well as Prime Minister Zulfikar Ali Bhutto and Indian prime minister Indira Gandhi. He adds that President Yahya Khan and General A. A. K. Niazi left unsung legacies, while Indian generals Shabeg Singh and Arun Shridhar Vaidya were killed as a result of the domestic fallout of Operation Blue Star, and Kuldip Singh Brar survived several assassination attempts on his own life.

Hashmi opines that as a result of the creation of Bangladesh, India has to deal with Muslim-majority Pakistan and Bangladesh on both its western and eastern sides respectively.

== See also ==
- Foreign relations of Pakistan
- Ministry of Foreign Affairs
