= High Commission of Pakistan, Dhaka =

Diplomatic mission of Pakistan to Bangladesh

- Location: Gulshan, Dhaka
- Address: NE (C)-2, Road 71
- Coordinates: 23°48′14.78″N 90°24′30.33″E
- Jurisdiction: Bangladesh; Bhutan
- High Commissioner: Imran Haider
- Website: Official website

The High Commission of Pakistan in Dhaka is the diplomatic mission of Pakistan to Bangladesh. This mission also handles diplomatic relations with Bhutan.

== History ==
Pakistan recognized Bangladesh on February 22, 1974. (Note: Multiple references:) Diplomatic relations between Bangladesh and Pakistan were established in January 1976, (Note: Multiple references:) and relations between Pakistan and Bhutan were established in 1988. Mohammad Khurshid became Pakistan's first envoy to Bangladesh in 1976. (Note: Multiple references:)

From 1976 to 1989, the diplomatic mission was called the Embassy of Pakistan in Dacca, and the Pakistani envoy held the rank of ambassador. After Pakistan rejoined the Commonwealth of Nations in 1989, of which Bangladesh was also a member, the mission was renamed as the High Commission of Pakistan in Dhaka, and the position was automatically changed to that of High Commissioner. The High Commissioner of Pakistan to Bangladesh also serves as the non-resident Ambassador to Bhutan.

== High Commissioner ==
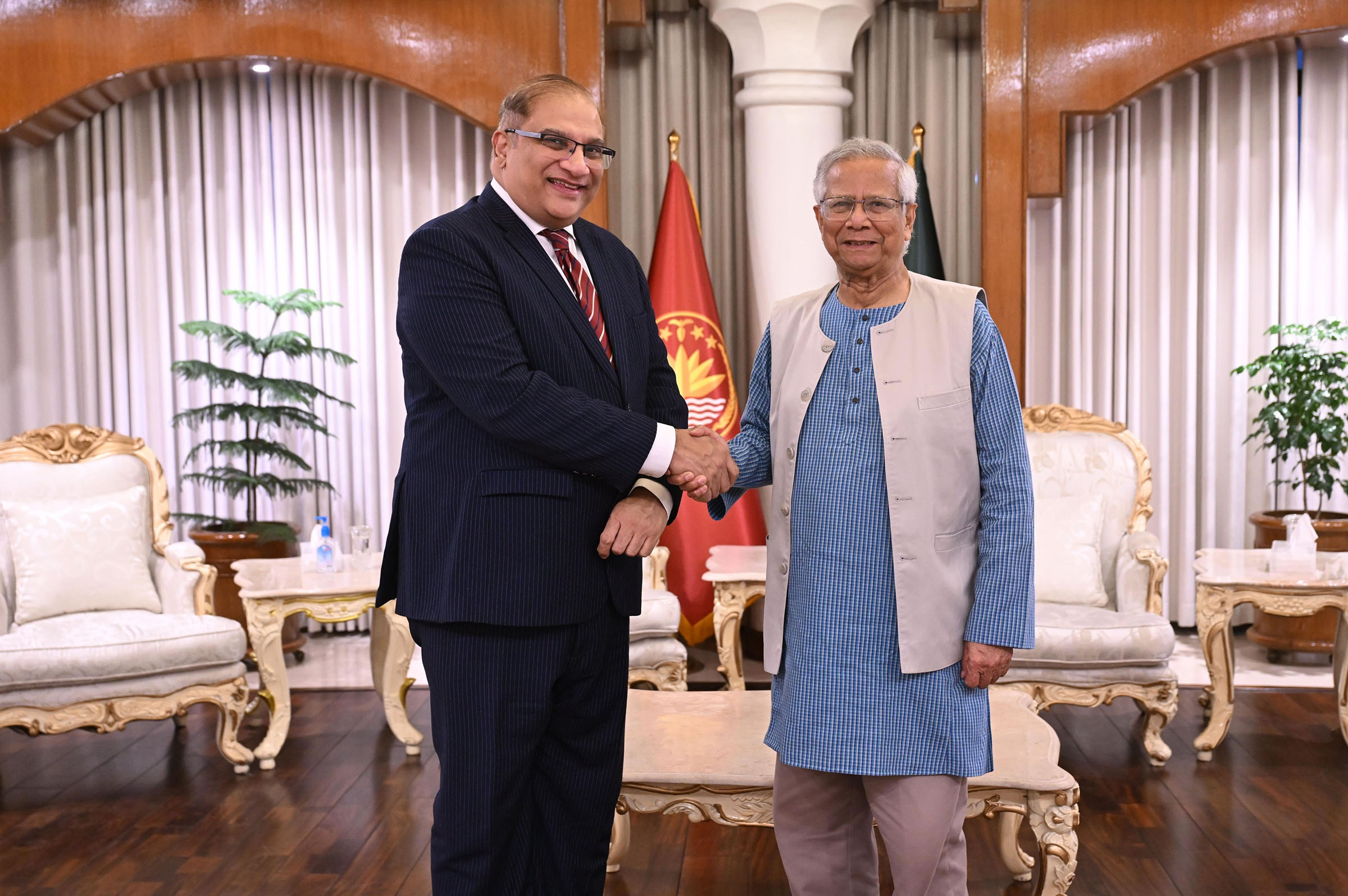
Pakistan High Commissioner Imran Haider meets Chief Adviser Muhammad Yunus

Imran Haider has been serving as the High Commissioner since August 2025. (Note: Multiple references:)

The former High Commissioners were:

- Syed Ahmed Maroof (2023–2025)
- Imran Ahmed Siddiqui (2020–2023)
- Rafiuzzaman Siddiqui (2016–2018)
- Sardar Shuja Alam (2015–2016)
- Afrasiab Mehdi Hashmi (2011–2014)
- M. Ashraf Qureshi (2010–1011)
- Alamgir Babar (2005–2009)
- Manzar Shafiq (2003–2005)
- Iqbal Ahmad Khan (1999–2003)
- Karam Elahi (1995–1999)
- Anwar Kamal (1990–1995)
- Riaz Hussain Khokhar (1986–1989)
- Tanvir Ahmad Khan (1982–1986)
- Humayun Khan (1979–1982)
- Mohammad Khurshid (1976–1979)

== See also ==
- High Commission of Bangladesh, Islamabad
- Bangladesh–Pakistan relations
- Bhutan–Pakistan relations
