= List of high commissioners of Bangladesh to Pakistan =

High Commissioner of Bangladesh to Pakistan
- পাকিস্তানে নিযুক্ত বাংলাদেশের হাইকমিশনার
- Government Seal of Bangladesh

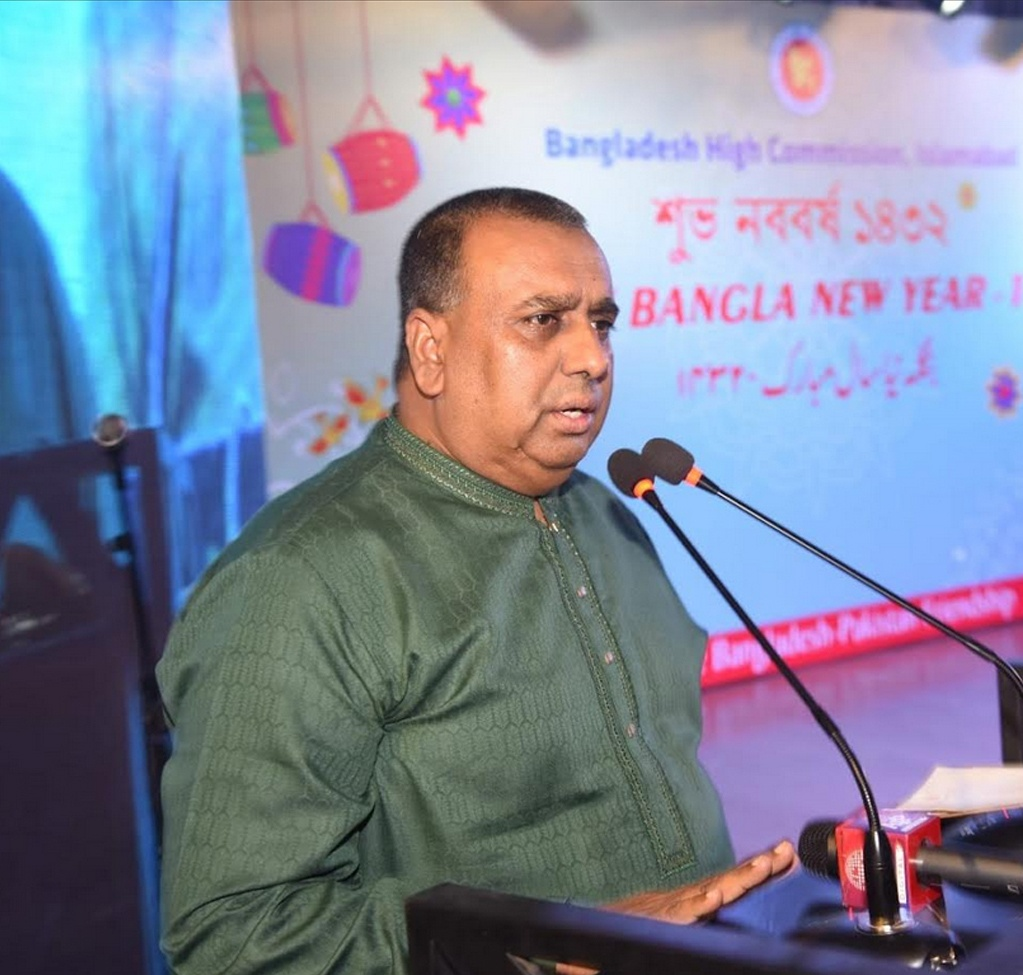
- Incumbent; Iqbal Hussain Khan since 12 December 2024
- Ministry of Foreign Affairs
- Style: The Honourable (formal); Mr. High Commissioner (informal); His Excellency (diplomatic)
- Reports to: Chief Adviser; Minister of Foreign Affairs
- Residence: Islamabad, Pakistan
- Seat: High Commission of Bangladesh, Islamabad
- Nominator: The Government of Bangladesh
- Appointer: The president of Bangladesh; on the advice of the; chief adviser
- Term length: Chief adviser’s pleasure
- Inaugural holder: Zahiruddin
- Formation: 3 January 1976; 50 years ago
- Deputy: Deputy High Commissioner
- Salary: ৳300000 (US$2,400) per month (incl. allowances)
- Website: www.bdhcpk.org

The high commissioner of Bangladesh to Pakistan is the top diplomatic representative of Bangladesh to Pakistan. The high commissioner heads the Bangladeshi High Commission in Islamabad. The post was created on 3 January 1976, shortly after Pakistan and Bangladesh established diplomatic relations. Initially, from 1976 to 1989, the Bangladeshi envoy held the rank of ambassador. After Pakistan rejoined the Commonwealth of Nations in 1989, of which Bangladesh was also a member, the post was changed by default to that of the High Commissioner.

The 15th and present high commissioner is Iqbal Hussain Khan, who assumed responsibilities in December 2024. There is also a deputy high commissioner of Bangladesh to Pakistan, who serves as the head of Bangladesh's deputy mission in Karachi.

== List of high commissioners ==
The following is a list of Bangladeshi envoys to Pakistan along with their tenures:

No.	Image	Name	Took office	Left office	Notes
1		Zahiruddin	3 January 1976	19 May 1978	
2		A.K.M. Nazrul Islam	27 May 1978	9 June 1982	
3		Quazi Golam Dastgir	19 June 1982	1 January 1984	
4		Abul Ahsan	16 April 1984	22 January 1987	
5		C. M. Shafi Sami	28 February 1987	5 October 1991	
6		M. Anwar Hashim	22 October 1991	31 October 1993	
7		Q. A. M. A. Rahim	3 November 1993	9 August 1998	
8		Masum A. Chowdhury	19 August 1998	19 September 1999	
9		Alimul Haque	4 March 2000	2 May 2003	
10		F. A. Shamim Ahmed	30 May 2003	4 May 2007	
11		Yasmeen Murshed	27 December 2007	23 November 2009	
12		Suhrab Hossain	29 July 2010	3 April 2016	
13	120x	Tarik Ahsan	8 July 2016	26 September 2020	
14		Md. Ruhul Alam Siddique	12 October 2020	11 December 2024	
15	120x120	Md. Iqbal Hussain Khan	12 December 2024	Incumbent	

== See also ==
- List of high commissioners of Bangladesh to India
- Bangladesh–Pakistan relations
- High Commission of Bangladesh, Islamabad
- Deputy High Commission of Bangladesh, Karachi
