= Tarik Ahsan =

Bangladeshi diplomat

His Excellency Tarik Ahsan
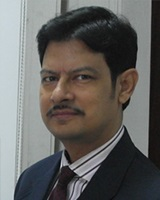

Ambassador of Bangladesh to Portugal
- In office 5 October 2020 – 25 May 2023
- Preceded by: Ruhul Alam Siddique
- Succeeded by: Rezina Ahmed

High Commissioner of Bangladesh to Pakistan
- In office 8 July 2016 – 26 September 2020
- Preceded by: Suhrab Hossain
- Succeeded by: Ruhul Alam Siddique

High Commissioner of Bangladesh to Sri Lanka
- In office 23 October 2014 – 30 June 2016
- Preceded by: Mohammad Sufiur Rahman
- Succeeded by: M. Riaz Hamidullah

Personal details
- Born: Dhaka, Bangladesh
- Education: Bangladesh University of Engineering and Technology; and International Institute of Social Studies
- Occupation: Diplomat

Tarik Ahsan was a professional Bangladeshi diplomat. His last diplomatic assignment was that of Ambassador of Bangladesh to Portugal since early October 2020. Before this assignment, he was the High Commissioner (Ambassador) of Bangladesh to Pakistan since July 2016. Prior to that, Tarik Ahsan had been Bangladesh High Commissioner to Sri Lanka since October 2014.

Tarik Ahsan's tenure as High Commissioner in Islamabad was marked by tense Bangladesh-Pakistan relations. Despite the odds, Ahsan has made sustained efforts to reduce tension and stabilize the relation between the two countries. He has also reached out to the people of Pakistan to highlight Bangladesh's spirit of war of liberation, its achievements as an independent country and its commitment to peace and development.

While in Lisbon, Tarik Ahsan was making sustained efforts for enhancing Bangladesh-Portugal relations at government as well as people's level.

Tarik Ahsan was also concurrently accredited as Bangladesh Ambassador to Guinea-Bissau and Cabo Verde as well as Bangladesh High Commissioner to Mozambique, with residence in Lisbon.

== Biography ==
Ahsan began his diplomatic career as the Second Secretary and First Secretary at the Permanent Mission of Bangladesh to the United Nations in New York, USA in the years 1996 to 1999. During this time, he represented Bangladesh in First (Disarmament), Fourth (Political) and Sixth (Legal) Committees of UN General Assembly. Among other overseas assignments, Ahsan was Counsellor at Bangladesh Embassy in Riyadh, Saudi Arabia from 1999 to 2002; Counsellor and Minister at Bangladesh Embassy in Jakarta, Indonesia from 2006 to 2008; and Minister and Chargé d'affaires at Bangladesh Embassy in Berlin, Germany from 2008 to 2010. During this period, he had the distinction of being the 100th signatory on behalf of Bangladesh to the Founding Treaty of International Renewable Energy Agency. With residence in Berlin, he also looked after Bangladesh's relation with Czech Republic, Slovakia, Slovenia and Austria. Back to Headquarters, Tarik Ahsan served as the Director General for International Organisations of the Ministry of Foreign Affairs (Bangladesh) from October 2010 to October 2014. Since late October 2014, Ahsan has been serving as Bangladesh's High Commissioner/Ambassador sequentially to Sri Lanka, Pakistan and Portugal. After completion of his assignment as Ambassador of Bangladesh to Portugal, he was briefly appointed as one of the Secretaries at the Ministry of Foreign Affairs from 1 to 4 June 2023. He went on retirement leave for one year from 5 June 2023.
