= Faruq Ahmed Choudhury =

Bangladeshi diplomat

- ফারুক আহমেদ চৌধুরী

High Commissioner of Bangladesh to India
- In office 8 August 1986 – 3 January 1992
- Preceded by: A. K. Khandker
- Succeeded by: Farooq Sobhan

Foreign Secretary
- In office 10 October 1984 – 17 July 1986
- Preceded by: A.H. Ataul Karim
- Succeeded by: Fakhruddin Ahmed

Ambassador of Bangladesh to the European Economic Community, Belgium, Luxembourg, and the Netherlands
- In office 22 December 1978 – 15 July 1982
- Preceded by: Abul Ahsan
- Succeeded by: Manzoor Ahmed Choudhury

Ambassador of Bangladesh to Bahrain and the United Arab Emirates
- In office 1976–1978

Personal details
- Born: 4 January 1934 Karimganj, Assam, British India
- Died: 17 May 2017 (aged 83) Dhaka, Bangladesh
- Party: Awami League

Faruq Ahmed Choudhury (4 January 1934 – 17 May 2017) was a Bangladeshi diplomat. He served as Bangladesh's first Chief of Protocol beginning in 1972, Foreign Secretary from 1984 to 1986, and High Commissioner to India from 1986 to 1992.

== Career ==
=== Early life and career ===
Choudhury was born in Karimganj, Assam, British India, on January 4, 1934. In 1956, Choudhury entered the Foreign Service of Pakistan as a diplomat (Bangladesh, then known as East Pakistan, was part of the country at the time). He held several appointments within the Foreign Office and several Parkistani embassies.

=== Bangladesh foreign service ===
In 1972, Choudhury was appointed as Bangladesh's first Chief of Protocol, within the Ministry of Foreign Affairs, following the country's independence from Pakistan.

From 1972 until 1976, Choudhury served as the Deputy High Commissioner of Bangladesh to the United Kingdom, where he took part in the negotiations for Bangladesh's entry in to the Commonwealth in 1972. Choudhury was next appointed as Bangladesh's Ambassador to Bahrain and the United Arab Emirates from 1976 to 1978. He then served as Ambassador accredited to both the European Economic Community (EEC) and the Benelux nations - Belgium, Luxembourg and the Netherlands - from 1978 until 1982.

Choudhury returned to the home office of the Ministry of Foreign Affairs in 1982. He was the chief coordinator for the 13th OIC Foreign Ministers' Meeting, which was held in 1983 in Dhaka. He then held the post of Additional Foreign Secretary from 1983 to 1984.

Faruq Choudhury was appointed Foreign Secretary, the highest ranking non-political official with the Ministry of Foreign Affairs, from 1984 to 1986.

Choudhury next served as High Commissioner of Bangladesh to India from 1986 until his retirement in 1992.

Choudhury retired from Ministry of Foreign Affairs in 1992. He wrote several books and focused on social causes during his retirement. He served on the Bangladesh Rural Advancement Committee (BRAC), the world's largest non-governmental development organization, from 1992 until 2006.

In 2014, Choudhury was awarded the IFIC Bank Literature Award for his writings on social and political issues. He also received the Bangla Academy Literary Award in 2016.

== Bibliography ==
Some of his Books are given below-

1. Jiboner Balukabelay (Autobiography)

2. Priyo Farjana

3. Biponno Prithibi (Science Friction)

4. Shorone Bangobondhu(Incidents & Memories with Sheikh Mujibur Rahman)

5. Ghotokal Shomokal

6. Janalay Nana Chobi

7. Shomoyer Aborte

And many more. He wrote his Memories with Bangabondhu Sheikh Mujibur Rahman on his books.

== Death ==
Choudhury died at Square Hospital in Dhaka on 17 May 2017, at the age of 84.
