= M. Aminul Islam =

Md. Aminul Islam is a Bangladeshi career diplomat

- এম আমিনুল ইসলাম

High Commissioner of Bangladesh to Canada
- In office May 1998 – March 2001
- Preceded by: Mufleh R. Osmany
- Succeeded by: Suhrab Hossain

Ambassador of Bangladesh to Bhutan
- In office 7 January 1980 – 15 September 1981
- Preceded by: Position created
- Succeeded by: Mohiuddin Ahmed Jaigirdar

Personal details
- Spouse: Nasreen Islam
- Profession: Diplomat

M. Aminul Islam is a former Bangladeshi career diplomat.

== Career ==
From 7 January 1980 to 15 September 1981, Islam served as the first ambassador of Bangladesh to Bhutan. M. U. A. Jaigirdar succeeded him in that position. He served as chief protocol officer to President Hussain Mohammad Ershad.

From May 1998 to April 2001, Islam served as the High Commissioner of Bangladesh to Canada. He succeeded Mufleh R. Osmany and was replaced by Suhrab Hossain.

In 1999, Islam, as High Commissioner of Bangladesh to Canada, asked the Canadian government to extradite S.H.M.B Noor Chowdhury, convicted assassin of President of Bangladesh Sheikh Mujibur Rahman.
