= Enayet Karim =

Bangladeshi diplomat

- এনায়েত করিম
- Karim with the US President Richard Nixon (1972)

Foreign Secretary of Bangladesh
- In office 14 July 1972 – 16 February 1974
- Preceded by: Sayyid Anwarul Karim
- Succeeded by: Fakhruddin Ahmed

Ambassador of Bangladesh to the United States

Personal details
- Born: 31 August 1927
- Died: 16 February 1974 (aged 46) Dhaka, Bangladesh
- Spouse: Husneara Karim
- Children: 2
- Education: BA (economics)
- Alma mater: University of Dhaka
- Occupation: Diplomat
- Awards: Independence Day Award (1977)

Enayet Karim (31 August 1927 – 16 February 1974) was a Bangladeshi diplomat. He was the first ambassador from Bangladesh to United States. He later served as the Foreign Secretary.

== Early life and education ==
Karim secured the first position in matriculation examination and later studied economics at University of Dhaka.

== Career ==
Karim had a brief teaching career at University of Dhaka. He joined the Pakistan Foreign Service in 1952. Karim served the Pakistani Missions in both Calcutta and New Delhi before assuming the key post of Director (India) in the Pakistan Foreign Ministry. In early 1970, Karim left Islamabad and took up the post of Counselor at the Pakistan Embassy in Washington DC.

In the initial stage of Bangladesh Liberation War, Karim propagated the cause of the independence of Bangladesh in the US diplomatic arena. But immediately afterwards Karim suffered two consecutive heart attacks within months and was hospitalized. In August 1971, the Bengali officers at the US Embassy formally announced their allegiance with the provisional Bangladesh Government. Karim joined them, risking the well-being of his family, in spite of his poor health conditions.

=== Foreign Secretary ===
After the independence of Bangladesh, Karim was nominated as the first Ambassador from Bangladesh to United States. But after a very short time, he was asked to assume the role of Foreign Secretary of Bangladesh. He also maintained international efforts to reconstruct war-ravaged Bangladesh under the UN Relief Operations, and to secure bilateral assistance from US and other major donors. His other major tasks were: reaching accords with New Delhi and Islamabad for the release of Pakistani POWs and war crime trial, repatriation of the stranded Bengalis from Pakistan and the Pakistanis from Bangladesh, and the distribution of assets and liabilities of the former federal government of Pakistan.

== Death and legacy ==
On 12 February 1974, while working at his office, Karim suffered his third heart attack which later proved fatal. In 1977, the Government of Bangladesh, honored him by posthumously awarding the Independence Day Award, the highest civilian award of the country.
