= Bhutan–Pakistan relations =

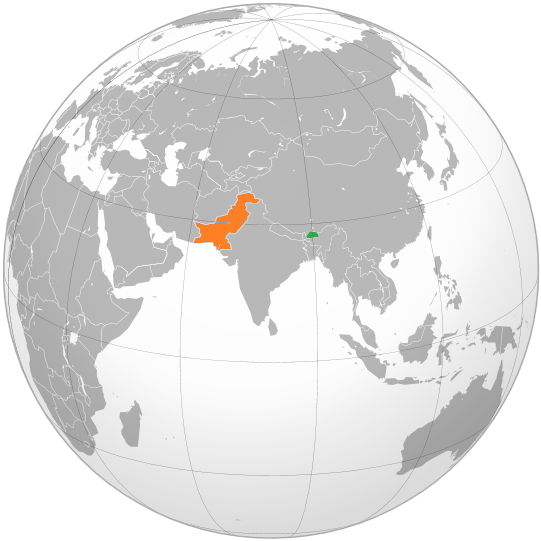
- Bhutan: Pakistan

Diplomatic mission
- Royal Bhutanese Embassy, Dhaka: High Commission of Pakistan, Dhaka

Envoy
- Ambassador-designate Rinchen Kuentsyl: non-resident Ambassador Imran Haider

Bhutan–Pakistan relations refer to foreign relations between Bhutan and Pakistan. Relations have been active at least since 2004. Both nations are members of the South Asian Association for Regional Cooperation (SAARC) and the United Nations. Neither country has a resident ambassador.

They are both Himalayan states and have two common neighbours – China and India. Bhutan has close relations with India while Pakistan has close relations with China. But Pakistan's relations with India are more tense, so India has at times viewed Pakistani approaches to Bhutan with suspicion.

== History ==
Bhutan and Pakistan have had links for centuries. In 1971, Bhutan was one of the first countries to recognize the secession of East Pakistan as independent Bangladesh. The relations between these countries were established diplomatically in 1988. The Bhutan Ambassador to Dhaka is recognized as a non-resident Ambassador to Pakistan while Pakistan's High Commissioner for Bangladesh is simultaneously recognized as a non-resident Ambassador to Bhutan.

== Scholarships ==
Pakistan offers scholarships to Bhutanese students, particularly in medicine and engineering.

== Trade ==
Major exports from Pakistan are cotton yarn, articles of textile materials, cotton fabric (woven), sports goods and leather. Imports by Pakistan include raw jute, crude rubber, oil seeds, cork and chemical materials/products. Economic cooperation between the two countries is minimal, owing to high freight rates and difficulties in accessing landlocked Bhutan. In 2008–2009 the total bilateral trade passed half a million US dollars.

In the period 2007–2011 only 11 Pakistanis visited Bhutan as tourists.

== Visits ==
There have been regular contacts between the leaders of two countries at different International Forums, besides the SAARC Summits. Bhutan attended the 12th SAARC Summit at Islamabad in January 2004. On the sidelines of the Summit, the President and Prime Minister of Pakistan had bilateral meetings with the Prime Minister of Bhutan. In November 2004, Pakistani Prime Minister Shaukat Aziz headed an official delegation to Bhutan, which raised suspicions in their common neighbour, India, that Pakistan may attempt to sabotage Indian interests in Bhutan.

In March 2011, the Bhutanese Prime Minister Lyonchen Jigme Yoser Thinley led a three-day delegation to Pakistan and met with Pakistani Prime Minister Syed Yusuf Raza Gilani. They covered a range of bilateral issues including economic, commercial, investment, educational and cultural links.

In June 2012, a delegation of Buddhist monks from Bhutan, travelling with the ambassador, was warmly received by Pakistan's Minister of State for Foreign Affairs, who emphasized the need for personal and interfaith contact between the countries. In 2018, a Bhutanese delegation consisting of the Bhutanese Ambassador and Buddhist monks visited Buddhist heritage sites in Mardan District, Pakistan.

== Diplomatic representation ==
Neither country has a resident ambassador. The embassy of Pakistan in Bangladesh is accredited to Bhutan. As of 2022, the Ambassador-designate of Bhutan to Pakistan is Rinchen Kuentsyl, while Syed Ahmed Maroof is the Pakistani non-resident Ambassador to Bhutan.
