= Suhrab Hossain =

Bangladeshi diplomat

- সুহরাব হোসেন

Bangladesh High Commissioner to Pakistan
- In office 27 April 2010 – 3 April 2016
- Preceded by: Yasmeen Murshed
- Succeeded by: Tarik Ahsan

Bangladesh High Commissioner to Canada
- In office April 2001 – February 2002
- Preceded by: M. Aminul Islam
- Succeeded by: Mohsin Ali Khan

Bangladesh Ambassador to Thailand
- In office 12 July 1999 – 12 April 2001
- Preceded by: Akramul Qader
- Succeeded by: Hemayet Uddin

Personal details
- Education: University of Dhaka

Suhrab Hossain is a Bangladeshi diplomat. He served as the high commissioner of Bangladesh to Canada and Pakistan and ambassador to Thailand and Uzbekistan.

== Early life ==
Hossain completed his post graduate studies in biochemistry from the University of Dhaka.

== Career ==
Hossain fought in the Bangladesh Liberation War as part of the Mukti Bahini.

Hossain joined the Bangladesh Foreign Service in 1973.

Hossain served as the ambassador of Bangladesh to Thailand from 12 July 1999 to 12 April 2001.

Hossain served as the high commissioner of Bangladesh to Canada from April 2001 replacing M. Aminul Islam.

Hossain served as the ambassador of Bangladesh to Uzbekistan.

=== High Commissioner to Pakistan ===
Hossain was appointed the high commissioner of Bangladesh to Pakistan on 27 April 2010. His appointment was on a contract basis as he had already retired from the foreign service and extended in 2012, 2014, and 2015. On 29 November 2011, he visited the University of the Punjab and met the vice-chancellor, Mujahid Kamran. On 28 August 2013, he met Ayaz Sadiq, speaker of the National Assembly of Pakistan, and discussed ways of strengthening the relationship between the two countries.

During Hossain's tenure relationship between Bangladesh and Pakistan declined; in part due to the verdicts of the International Crimes Tribunal against collaborators of Pakistan Army during Bangladesh Liberation War. On 23 December 2015, the second secretary of the political wing of the Pakistan High Commission in Dhaka, Fareena Arshad, was expelled from Dhaka after Bangladesh security forces alleged she had links with the militant Jamaat-ul-Mujahideen Bangladesh. Hossain was summoned twice by the Foreign Ministry of Pakistan to protest the incident. He was briefly recalled on 31 December 2015 to Dhaka over his absence for the High Commission during difficult times in Bangladesh-Pakistan relations. In January 2016, the political counsellor and head of chancery of the Bangladesh High Commission in Pakistan, Moushumi Rahman, was expelled from Pakistan.

The Detective Branch briefly detained Abrar Ahmed Khan, the assistant private secretary in the press wing of the Pakistan High Commission in Bangladesh, on 2 February 2016, allegedly to determine why he was carrying a large amount of Indian currency. Jahangir Hossain, press officer at the Bangladesh High Commission in Pakistan was briefly abducted by unidentified individuals in the same day in Pakistan. Foreign Secretary of Bangladesh, Rear Admiral Mohammad Khurshed Alam summoned the High Commissioner of Pakistan to Bangladesh, Shuja Alam, to protest the incident. In retaliation, Hossain was summoned by the Foreign Ministry of Pakistan.

Hossain served as the high commissioner of Bangladesh to Pakistan till 3 April 2016 when he was replaced by Tarik Ahsan.
