= Zokey Ahad =

Bangladeshi diplomat

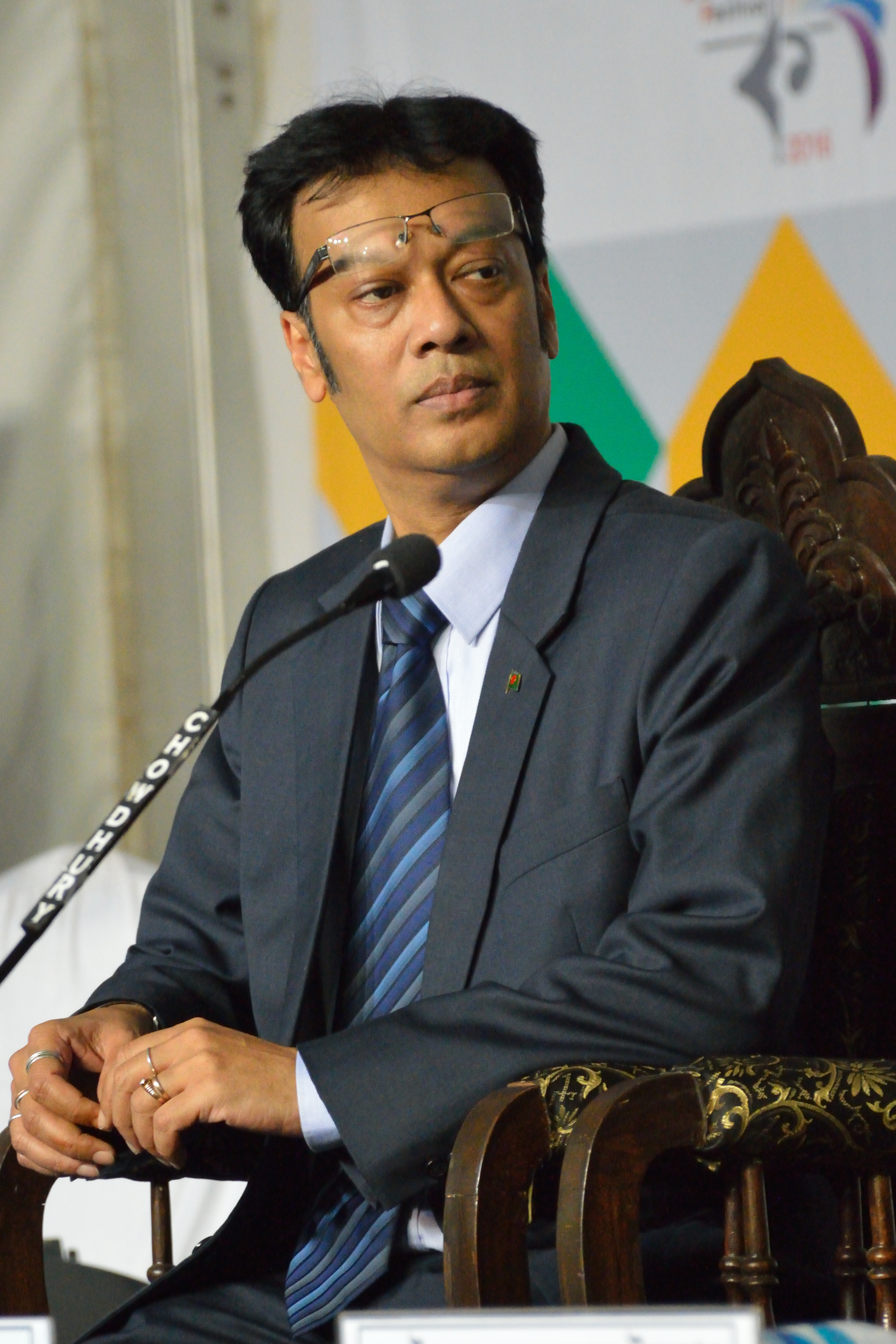
- Ahad in Kolkata (2016)

High Commissioner of Bangladesh to Mauritius
- Incumbent
- Assumed office 2024
- Preceded by: Rezina Ahmed

Personal details
- Born: 15 December 1968 (age 57) Dhaka, East Pakistan, Pakistan
- Education: Monash University; University of Dhaka; Jagannath University

Zokey Ahad (born 15 December 1968) is a Bangladeshi career diplomat currently serving as the High Commissioner of Bangladesh to the Republic of Mauritius.

== Early life and education ==
Ahad was born in Dhaka in 1968. He earned a Master of Commerce in Management from Jagannath University in 1989, followed by a Master of Business Administration from the Institute of Business Administration, University of Dhaka in 1996. He later obtained a Master of Arts in Diplomacy and Trade from Monash University in 2001.

== Career ==
Ahad joined the 17th batch of the Bangladesh Civil Service in 1998.

Ahad began his diplomatic career as an Assistant Secretary at the Ministry of Foreign Affairs in Dhaka from 1998 to 2001. He served at the Bangladesh Embassy in Beijing from 2001 to 2005. He served at The Hague from 2005 to 2008, and as Assistant High Commissioner in Manchester from 2011 to 2014. He was the Director at the Ministry of Foreign Affairs from 2008 to 2011. He also served as Deputy High Commissioner in Kolkata from 2014 to 2017. He visited the construction site for Bangladesh Bhaban at Visva-Bharati University in Shantiniketan.

At the Ministry of Foreign Affairs, Ahad was a Director General from 2017 to 2022. He was the Consul General in Kunming, China, from 2022 to 2024.

In February 2024, Ahad was appointed as the High Commissioner of Bangladesh to Mauritius. He presented his credentials to President Prithvirajsing Roopun in June.
