= C. M. Shafi Sami =

Bangladeshi diplomat

- সি এম শফি সামি

Foreign Secretary
- In office 23 March 1999 – 26 January 2001
- Preceded by: Mustafizur Rahman
- Succeeded by: Syed Muazzem Ali

High Commissioner of Bangladesh to India
- In office 7 April 1995 – 7 June 1999
- Preceded by: Farooq Sobhan
- Succeeded by: Mostafa Faruk Mohammad

High Commissioner of Bangladesh to Pakistan
- In office 28 February 1987 – 5 October 1991
- Preceded by: Abul Ahsan
- Succeeded by: M. Anwar Hashim

Personal details
- Born: 27 January 1942 (age 84) Dhaka, Bangladesh
- Education: University of Dhaka

CM Shafi Sami (born 27 January 1942) is a retired Bangladeshi diplomat. He was selected as an adviser of the caretaker government of Bangladesh under President Iajuddin Ahmed and resigned after about a month with three other advisers Hasan Mashhud Chowdhury, Akbar Ali Khan and Sultana Kamal. According to Sheikh Hasina, they failed to discharge their constitutional responsibilities in the name of crackdown on corruption.

== Early life ==
Sami was born on 27 January 1942 to Abdus Sami Chowdhury, a District and Sessions Court judge, and Roshan Ara Chowdhury, daughter of Khan Bahadur Abdul Hai Chowdhury. He belonged to the Chowdhuries of Bahadurpur, an Islamised branch of the Pal family of Panchakhanda.

Sami passed his matriculation from Jamalpur Government College and intermediate exam from MC College in Sylhet. He got his bachelor's and master's in physics from the University of Dhaka in 1962 and 1963 respectively. He joined Pakistan Civil Service in 1966. Prior to that he also worked at Pakistan Atomic Energy Commission (PAEC) and East Pakistan University of Engineering and Technology for a while.

== Career ==
Sami was the chief coordinator of the first SAARC summit and was selected the deputy general secretary of the summit. He also worked at the Bangladesh embassy in Cairo and as the Charge-de-affairs in Paris. He also worked in the UNESCO as a residing representative. He served as Bangladesh's High Commissioner to Pakistan from February 1987 to October 1991.

Sami became the Bangladeshi High Commissioner to India in 1995 and remained there till 1999. During this time he played an important part in signing the Ganges Water Distribution Agreement and Chittagong Hill Tracts Peace Accord. After that, he served as the foreign secretary till 2001. During the caretaker government of 2001, he became the chief foreign secretary. Besides he was a member of the International Civil Service Commission of the United Nations. He also led Bangladeshi correspondents in UN, NAM, OIC and other international conferences.
