= Syed Anwarul Karim =

Bangladeshi diplomat (1928–2019)

- সায়েদ আনোয়ারুল করিম
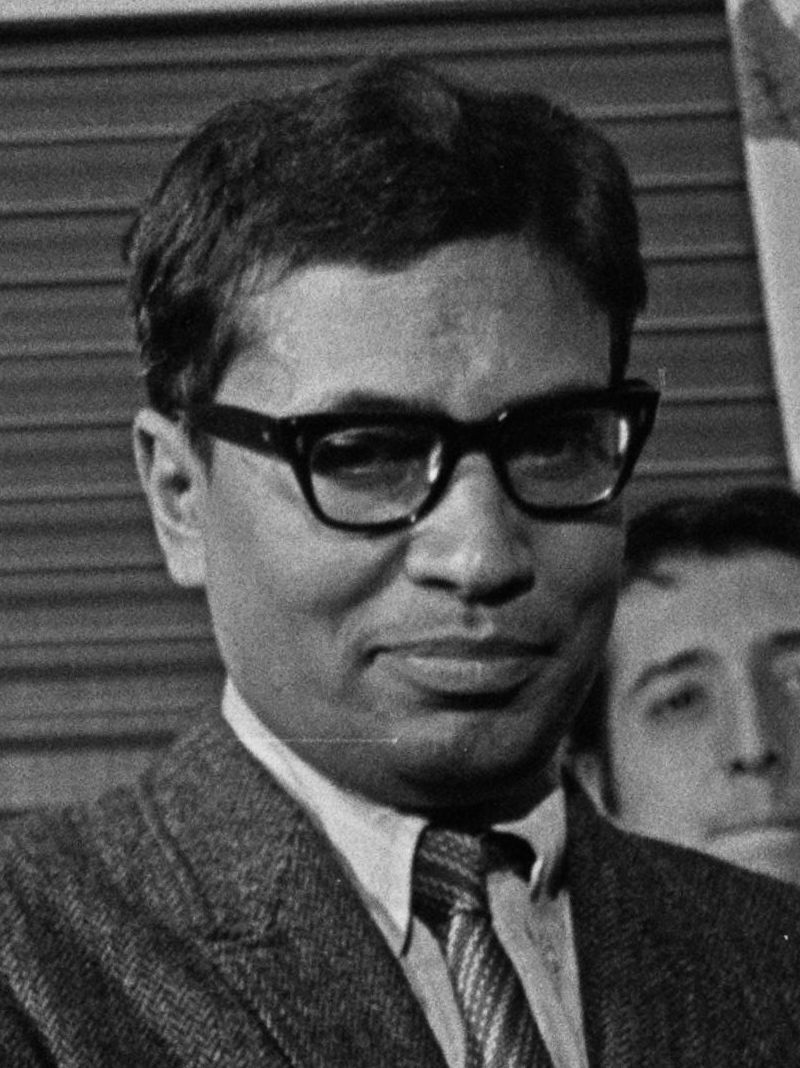
- Karim in 1971

Ambassador of Bangladesh to Myanmar
- In office 29 June 1976 – 10 June 1978
- Preceded by: Khwaja Mohammed Kaiser
- Succeeded by: Zahiruddin

Permanent Representative of Bangladesh to the United Nations
- In office 1974–1976
- Preceded by: Position created
- Succeeded by: Khwaja Mohammed Kaiser

Foreign Secretary of Bangladesh
- In office 17 January 1972 – 14 July 1972
- Preceded by: Abul Fateh
- Succeeded by: Enayet Karim

Personal details
- Born: 1928
- Died: 17 March 2019 (aged 90–91) New York City, U.S.

Syed Anwarul Karim (1928 – 17 March 2019) was a Bangladeshi diplomat and the first Permanent Representative of Bangladesh to the United Nations.

== Early life ==
Karim was born in 1928.

== Career ==
Karim was the Deputy Permanent Representative of Pakistan to the United Nations when the Bangladesh Liberation War started in 1971. He swore allegiance to the government of Bangladesh in exile, defecting from the Pakistan mission in August 1971.

From January 1972 to July 1972, Karim was the Secretary at the Ministry of Foreign Affairs.

Karim was the first observer of Bangladesh to the United Nations and became the first Permanent Representative of Bangladesh to the United Nations after Bangladesh joined the United Nations in 1974.

== Death ==
Karim died on 17 March 2019 in the Riverdale neighborhood of the Bronx, New York City from cancer.
