= Fakhruddin Ahmed (secretary) =

Bangladesh diplomat and foreign secretary of Bangladesh

- ফখরুদ্দিন আহমেদ

Foreign Secretary of Bangladesh
- In office 17 July 1986 – 8 May 1987
- Preceded by: Faruq Ahmed Choudhury
- Succeeded by: A. K. M. Nazrul Islam
- In office 22 October 1974 – 15 November 1975
- Preceded by: Enayet Karim
- Succeeded by: Tabarak Hussain

High Commissioner of Bangladesh to the United Kingdom
- In office May 1982 – July 1986
- Preceded by: Abul Fateh
- Succeeded by: Mir Shawkat Ali

Ambassador of Bangladesh to Yugoslavia
- In office 1978–1980

Ambassador of Bangladesh to Italy
- In office 1 July 1977 – 17 January 1978
- Preceded by: Iqbal Athar
- Succeeded by: Khan Shamsur Rahman

Personal details
- Born: 1931
- Died: 2 November 2001 (aged 69–70) Pittsburgh, Pennsylvania, United States
- Education: University of Dhaka

Fakhruddin Ahmed (1931 – 2 November 2001) was a Bangladesh diplomat and former Foreign Secretary of Bangladesh.

== Early life ==
Ahmed was born in 1931. He graduated HS from Khulna Zilla School in 1946, and attended Khulna Daulatpur College, Calcutta Islamia College, and University of Dhaka. He had a M. A.in International Relations from the University of Dhaka. He had also studied at The Fletcher School at Tufts University upon joining the Pakistan Foreign Service in 1954.

== Career ==
Ahmed joined the Pakistan Foreign Service in 1954. From 1957 until 1971, he served in different capacities at the Pakistan Diplomatic Missions in Jeddah, New York City, Tehran, Accra and at the Ministry of Foreign Affairs of Pakistan in Islamabad as the director (personnel).

Ahmed returned to Bangladesh in 1973 through Afghanistan after Bangladesh achieved independence from Pakistan in 1971 and started working in the Ministry of Foreign Affairs in Bangladesh.

From October 1973 to November 1975, Ahmed served as the Foreign Secretary of Bangladesh. He then became the ambassador of Bangladesh to Italy from July 1977 until January 1978.

From 1978 to 1980, Ahmed was the Ambassador of Bangladesh to Albania, Yugoslavia, and Greece.

Ahmed was the High Commissioner of Bangladesh to the United Kingdom from May 1982 until July 1986.

From 1986 to 1987, Ahmed served his second term as the Foreign Secretary of Bangladesh.

From 1990 to 1991, Ahmed served as the Foreign Affairs advisor to the President of Bangladesh, Justice Shahabuddin Ahmed, with the rank of a minister. He wrote Critical Times – Memoirs of a South Asian Diplomat about his time in the foreign service.

== Death ==
Ahmed was staying with his daughter in Pittsburgh, United States for cancer treatment in 2001. He died on 2 November 2001 after suffering from cancer for two years.
