= Rezina Ahmed =

Former ambassador of Bangladesh to Portugal

- রেজিনা আহমেদ

Ambassador of Bangladesh to Portugal
- In office 4 October 2023 – 4 December 2024
- Preceded by: Tarik Ahsan
- Succeeded by: M Mahfuzul Haque

High Commissioner of Bangladesh to Mauritius
- In office July 2018 – September 2023
- Preceded by: Md. Abdul Mannan Howlader
- Succeeded by: Zokey Ahad

Personal details
- Education: University of Dhaka

Rezina Ahmed is a Bangladeshi diplomat and former ambassador of Bangladesh to Portugal. She is the former High Commissioner of Bangladesh to Mauritius. She was the Consul General of Bangladesh in Milan.

== Early life ==
Ahmed did her bachelor's degree and masters in International Relations at the University of Dhaka.

== Career ==
Ahmed worked for BRAC, the largest non-profit in Bangladesh.

In 1994, Ahmed joined the Bangladesh Civil Service as a foreign service cadre. She served in the Bangladesh High Commission, Canberra. She has served in the Embassy of Bangladesh, Moscow, and Embassy of Bangladesh, Yangon. She was the Deputy Chief of Protocol at the Ministry of Foreign Affairs.

Ahmed was briefly appointed Ambassador of Bangladesh to Myanmar in August 2017. She had served as the Consul General of Bangladesh in Milan, Italy. In May 2018, Ahmed was appointed High Commissioner of Bangladesh to the Mauritius. She was concurrently accredited High Commissioner of Bangladesh to Seychelles.

Ahmed was appointed Ambassador of Bangladesh to Portugal in June 2023 replacing Ambassador Tarik Ahsan. She presented her credentials to President Marcelo Rebelo de Sousa in January 2024. She is concurrently accredited as the ambassador of Bangladesh to Cape Verde.

In December 2024, Ahmed retired and returned to Bangladesh as a Secretary of the Ministry of Foreign Affairs.
