= Abul Fateh =

Bangladeshi diplomat, statesman and Sufi (1924 - 2010)

- আবুল ফতেহ
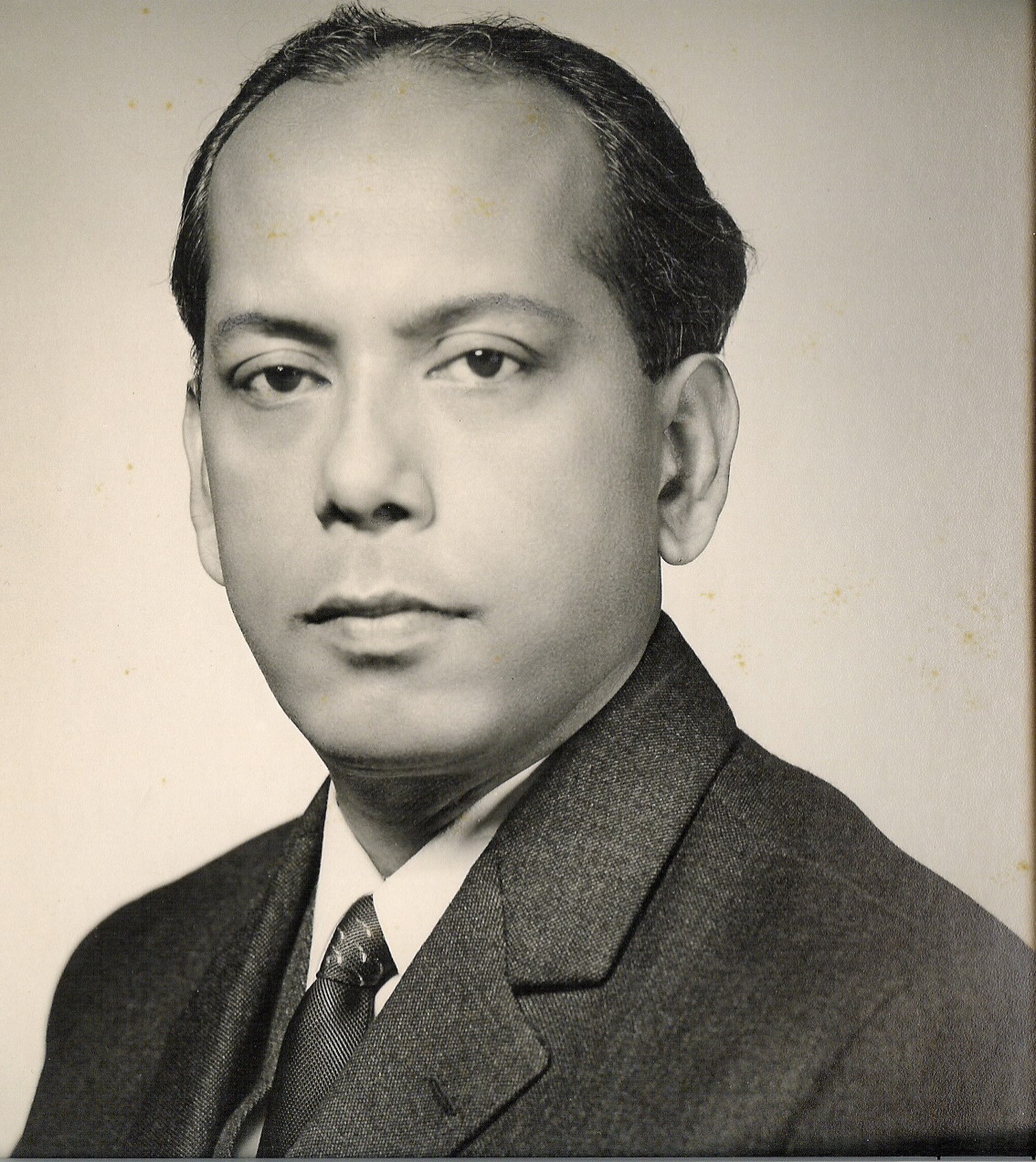
- Fateh as the Deputy High Commissioner in Calcutta (1969)

High Commissioner of Bangladesh to the United Kingdom
- In office 1976–1977
- Preceded by: Syed Abdus Sultan
- Succeeded by: Fakhruddin Ahmed

Ambassador of Bangladesh to France
- In office 1972–1976
- Preceded by: Position created

Foreign Secretary of Bangladesh
- In office 30 December 1971 – 16 January 1972
- Preceded by: Position created
- Succeeded by: Syed Anwarul Karim

Ambassador of Pakistan to Iraq
- In office 1970–1971

Personal details
- Born: 16 May 1924 Kishoreganj, Bengal Province, British India
- Died: 4 December 2010 (aged 86) London, England
- Citizenship: United Kingdom, Bangladesh
- Spouse: Mahfuza Banu (m. 1956)
- Children: 2
- Education: English literature
- Alma mater: University of Dhaka

AFM Abul Fateh (16 May 1924 – 4 December 2010) was a Bangladeshi diplomat and statesman. He served as the founding director of the Foreign Service Academy of Pakistan and the first foreign secretary of Bangladesh when it gained its independence in 1971. He was the senior-most diplomat in the Mujibnagar government. He served as an ambassador of Pakistan to Iraq and as an ambassador of Bangladesh to the United Kingdom, France, and Algeria.

== Early life and education ==
Abul Fateh was born on 16 May 1924 to Abdul Gafur and his second wife Zohra Khatun in Kishoreganj in the then Bengal Presidency, British India. Fateh was a middle child among twelve children who survived to adulthood; two other siblings died young. Gafur had attended Presidency College, Calcutta, and was one of the first Muslim darogas (sheriffs) in British India. Fateh passed his matriculation exam from Ramkrishna High English School in Kishorganj in 1941 and intermediate exam from Ananda Mohan College in Mymensingh in 1943. He then earned his bachelor's (with honours) in 1946 and master's in 1947 in English literature from the University of Dhaka.

== Career ==
=== Pakistani diplomat ===
While teaching English literature at Brindaban College in Sylhet, he took the first Foreign Service exams of Pakistan (1948), before teaching English literature for a few months at Michael Madhusudhan Datta College in Jessore. He joined the first batch of Pakistan Foreign Service trainees in 1949, moving to Karachi. Soon after he left for training in London, which included taking a special course at the London School of Economics, he moved in 1950 to Paris to complete his training. Returning briefly to Karachi, he was sent back (1951) to Paris as third secretary in the Pakistan Embassy.

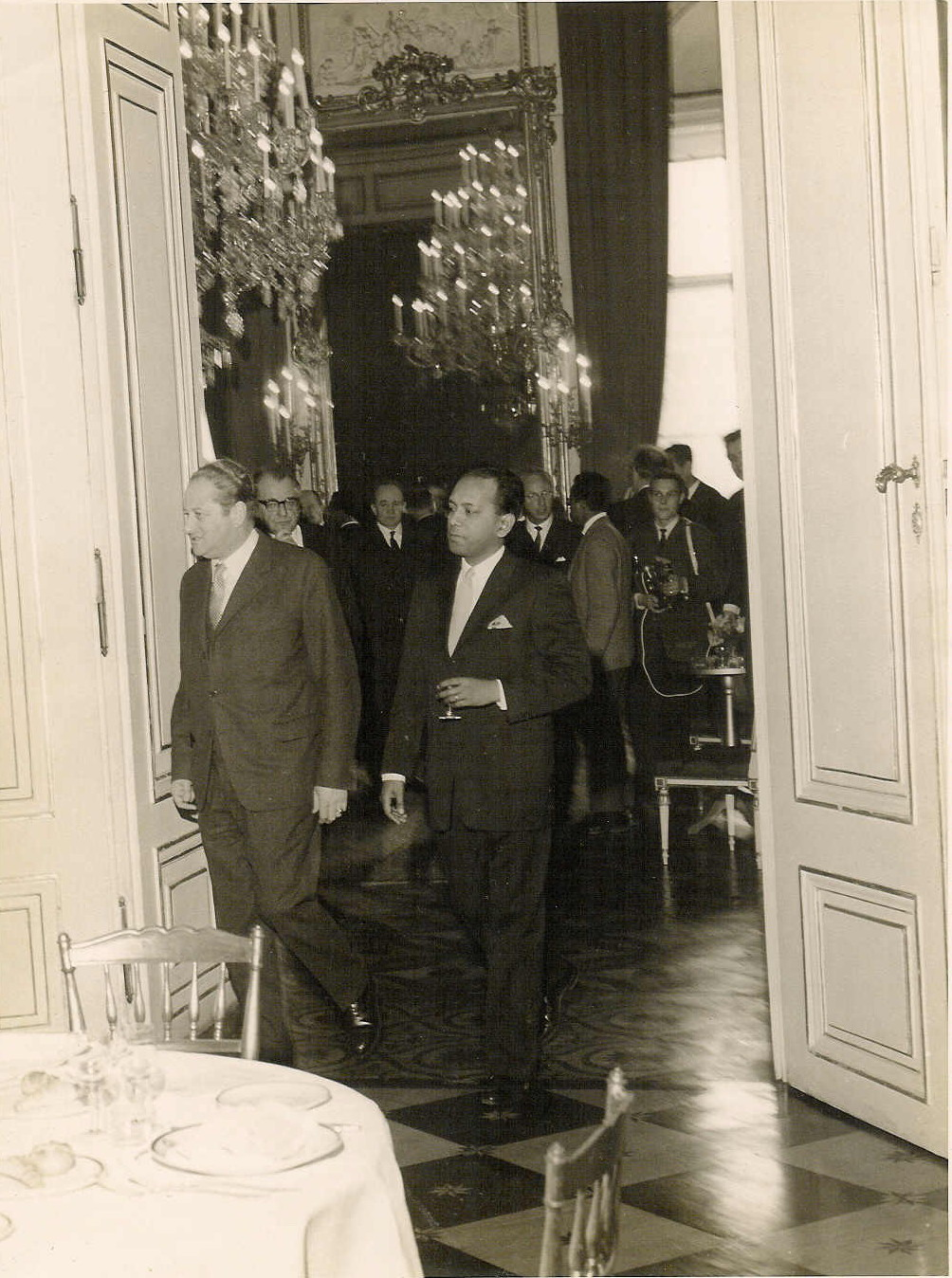
Abul Fateh (right) with Austrian Foreign Minister Bruno Kreisky, Vienna, 1962

A further posting as third secretary followed in Calcutta (1953–1956). Then promoted to second secretary, he served in the Pakistan Embassy in Washington, D.C., from 1956 to 1960.

Fateh was a director attached to the Foreign Ministry in Karachi from 1960 to 1963, during which time he was the founding director of Pakistan's Foreign Service Academy in Lahore and also went for a year and a half (1962–1963) to Geneva as a Fellow of the Graduate Institute of International Studies (Institut Universitaire de Hautes Etudes Internationales) under a Carnegie fellowship.

Fateh was first secretary (and latterly acting chief of mission) in Prague from 1965 to 1966, counsellor in New Delhi from 1966 to 1967, and deputy high commissioner in Calcutta from 1968 to 1970. He received his first posting as ambassador, at the Pakistan Embassy in Baghdad, in 1970.

=== Bangladeshi independence ===
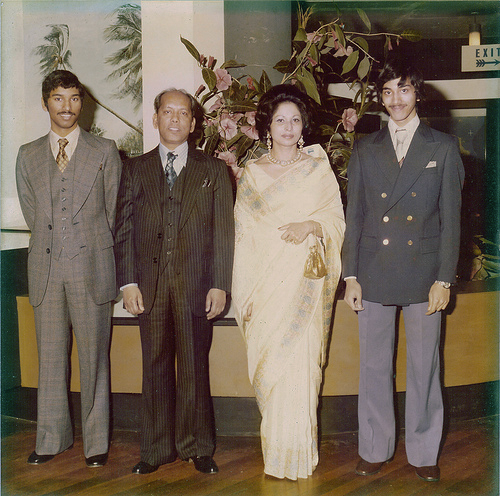
Abul Fateh with family (from left to right: Anatul Fateh, Abul Fateh, Mahfuza Banu, Eenasul Fateh) in London in 1977

After the Pakistani military crackdown in March 1971, Abul Fateh received a request from a former university dormitory mate, Syed Nazrul Islam, then acting president in the Bangladesh government-in-exile, to join the liberation struggle.

At about the same time, in July 1971, Fateh received a summons from the Pakistan Foreign Ministry to attend a conference in Tehran of regional Pakistani ambassadors. He chose to take his official car ostensibly to drive to Tehran, but as he and his driver approached the Iran–Iraq border, he feigned chest pains and ordered the driver to return him home, where he arrived that evening. Saying that he would take a plane the next day, he dismissed the driver. That night, he fled with his wife and sons across the border into Kuwait, where they were assisted by officials attached to the local Indian Embassy to take a plane to London. He was the first ambassador to defect from Pakistan. The news was received with fury by the military regime in Islamabad, duped by what was later described as a "cool and calculated James Bond-type adventure" and a calculated plunge into danger. It was a dramatic defection that created a sensation in diplomatic circles and greatly boosted the morale of those engaged in the war of liberation. The Yahya Khan military regime in Pakistan was furious and requested the British Government to extradite Abul Fateh from London, but the requests were rebuffed by the British government. These events were chronicled in a 2003 National Geographic Channel television documentary, Running for Freedom. Then at the time Bangladesh began seeking independence, he spectacularly defected and changed sides to support the fledgling country of Bangladesh – a major propaganda coup and morale boost for the cause of Bangladeshi liberation given his stature in Pakistan's hierarchy.

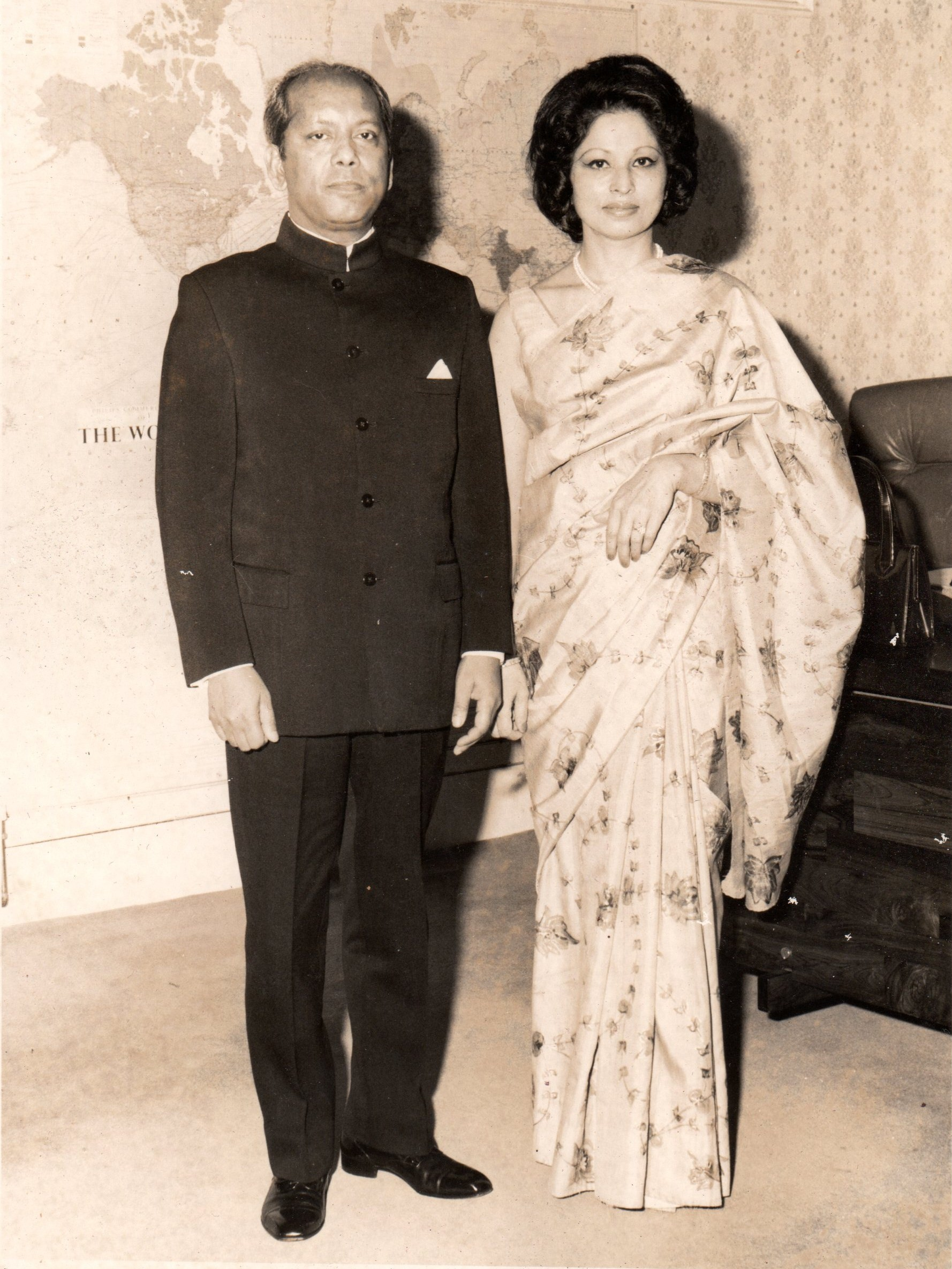
Abul Fateh and Mahfuza Banu in 1976

The Mujibnagar government made him ambassador-at-large, followed in August 1971 by the concurrent position of advisor to the acting president, a position he was to resign in January 1972 after the return to Bangladesh of Bangabandhu Sheikh Mujibur Rahman. He had a key role managing relations with the United States and India whilst heading the nascent country's diplomatic service. As the senior-most diplomat of the Bangladesh movement in the United Nations delegation under Justice Abu Sayed Choudhury, which was in New York in September 1971 to lobby for the Bangladesh cause at the General Assembly, he played a vital role in the delegation's lobbying efforts. He was also in communication with other governments, such as the Nixon administration in the United States, and also with senators, congressmen, and high officials in the US administration, World Bank, and IMF; he had the advantage as well of being familiar with decision-makers and the decision-making process, having served as a diplomat in Washington 20 years earlier. Former colleague Syed Muazzem Ali described him as a "soft-spoken and scholarly diplomat" who was exceptional in articulating the cause and whose contributions were invaluable. He was one of the first high officials to reach Dhaka after its liberation, and was quartered with other senior officials in Bangabhaban until January 1972. He was also the highest Bangladeshi official in Dhaka until the acting president and cabinet arrived after independence; on his arrival in Dhaka, he was driven under escort from the airport, becoming the first civilian official to lay a wreath at the ruins of the Shaheed Minar, an act planned to mark the first presence of the government in Dhaka. Already the effective head of the incipient foreign service, he became foreign secretary at the end of 1971, playing a key role in formulating Bangladesh's foreign policy.

Especially intriguing is the move, an abortive one, by the Pakistani authorities to have A.F.M Abul Fateh, a Bengali serving as Pakistan's ambassador abroad, extradited to Islamabad once he switches allegiance to the Mujibnagar government.

— Syed Badrul Ahsan, New Age newspaper, Dhaka

=== Bangladeshi ambassador ===
He then took up the position of Bangladesh's first ambassador in Paris (1972–1976). The early part of this posting involved extensive travel in Africa to persuade African governments to recognise the independence of Bangladesh. In 1973 he represented Bangladesh at a Commonwealth conference for youth ministers in Lusaka. In 1975 he went to Morocco and, at a time of a shortage in supply of phosphates, managed to secure a substantial phosphate shipment for Bangladesh.

In mid-1975 he was selected to be high commissioner in the UK, which post he took up in early 1976. His two years in London (1976–1977) saw him chairing the Commonwealth Conference on Human Ecology and Development, and the Bangladesh government approved his recommendation that dual citizenship be permitted. Many people from Bangladesh were settled in the UK, whose remittances into Bangladesh were an important source of foreign exchange. He pointed out that to oblige them to forgo Bangladesh citizenship if they took up the benefits of British nationality was not conducive to the continued maintenance of their ties to the mother country.

His last post was as ambassador in Algiers (1977–1982). He represented the Bangladesh government at conferences on Namibia in Algiers of the United Nations (1980) and the Non-Aligned Conference (1981). He retired from that post in 1982.

== Personal life ==
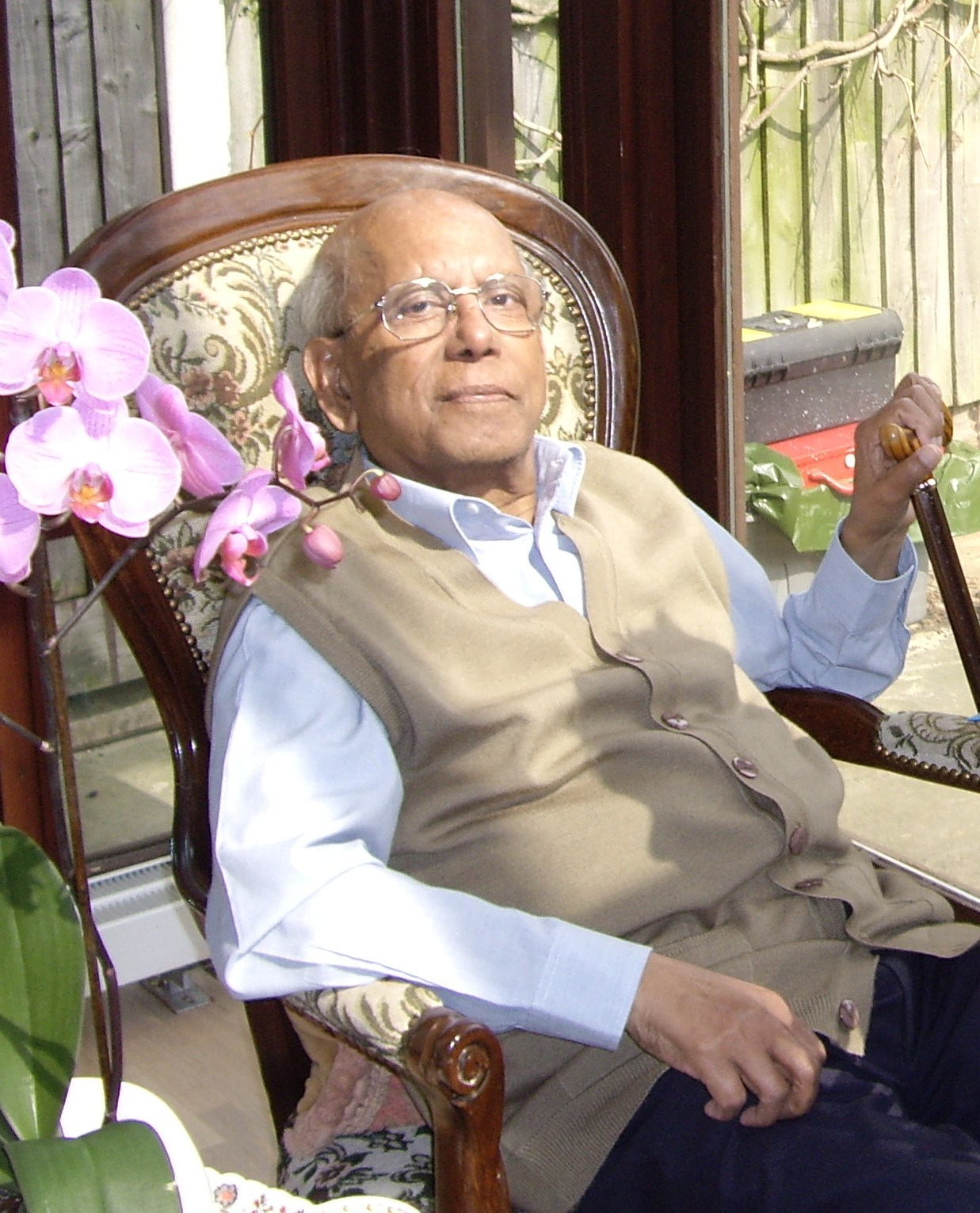
Fateh in 2007, at the age of 83

On 5 January 1956, Fateh married Mahfuza Banu in Rangpur. Banu originated from Dhubri, Assam, daughter of Shahabuddin Ahmed, a lawyer, and Mashudaa Banu, a social campaigner. They had two sons, one of whom, Aladin Fate, is a strategy consultant, academic, artist, and editor emeritus of the Bangladeshi news organisation Bdnews24.com.

Retiring in 1982, Fateh lived with his wife in Dhaka for ten years before they settled in London to be near their sons. His story was later documented in a National Geographic documentary, Running for Freedom.

Fateh died in London on 4 December 2010. He was buried with Bangladesh state honours at Hendon Cemetery, London, on 7 December.

== Honours ==
At the launch of his university's South Asia Centre in 2015, the president and director of the London School of Economics, Craig Calhoun, included Abul Fateh in a list of a dozen public figures of the 20th century who he felt represented "the greatest fruits" of the "close mutual relations between South Asia and the LSE". A former Carnegie Fellow in International Peace and Rockefeller Foundation Scholar and Research Fellow, he has been described as "soft-spoken and scholarly" and "a lesson for all diplomats".

- Carnegie Foundation Fellow in International Peace
- Rockefeller Foundation Scholar
- Queen Elizabeth II Silver Jubilee Medal (1975)
