= Md. Ruhul Alam Siddique =

Bangladeshi diplomat

- মো. রুহুল আলম সিদ্দিক

Foreign Secretary
- Acting
- In office 23 May 2025 – 19 June 2025
- President: Mohammed Shahabuddin
- Chief Adviser: Muhammad Yunus
- Preceded by: Md. Jashim Uddin
- Succeeded by: Asad Alam Siam

High commissioner of Bangladesh to Pakistan
- In office 12 October 2020 – 11 December 2024
- Preceded by: Tarik Ahsan
- Succeeded by: Md. Iqbal Hussain Khan

Ambassador of Bangladesh to Portugal
- In office 20 February 2017 – 4 October 2020
- Preceded by: Imtiaz Ahmed
- Succeeded by: Tarik Ahsan

Personal details
- Education: University of Dhaka

Md. Ruhul Alam Siddique is a Bangladeshi diplomat who has served as the Acting Secretary of Ministry of Foreign Affairs. He previously served as the ambassador of Bangladesh to Portugal and the High Commissioner of Bangladesh to Pakistan.

== Early life ==
Ruhul Alam Siddique pass SSC from Pabna Zila School on 1981 and HSC from Dhaka College on 1983. Siddique has a Masters of Public Administration from the University of Dhaka. He has a Masters in Foreign Affairs and Trade from Monash University. He joined the 11th batch of Bangladesh Civil Service.

== Career ==
Siddique has served in the Bangladesh Embassy in Germany and Singapore.

Siddique served as a minister in the High Commission of Bangladesh to India. He was then made the Deputy High Commissioner of Bangladesh to Pakistan.

Siddique was the Director General (East Asia & Pacific Wing) at the Ministry of Foreign Affairs. He was appointed the Ambassador of Bangladesh to Portugal on 27 September 2016 and stationed in Lisbon. He met with representatives from Federation of Bangladesh Chambers of Commerce and Industry in November 2017 in a bit to increase trade between Portugal and Bangladesh.

Siddique was appointed the High Commissioner of Bangladesh to Pakistan on 20 July 2020. He oversaw the celebration of the 51st Armed Forces Day of Bangladesh in Islamabad in 2021.
