= M Mahfuzul Haque =

Bangladeshi diplomat

- এম মাহফুজুল হক

Ambassador of Bangladesh to Portugal
- In office 29 January 2025 – 8 August 2026
- Preceded by: Rezina Ahmed
- Succeeded by: Vacant

Personal details
- Education: University of Dhaka; University of Bergen; International Institute of Social Studies

M Mahfuzul Haque is a Bangladeshi diplomat. He was an ambassador of Bangladesh to Portugal from January 2025 until March 2026.

== Education ==
M Mahfuzul Haque earned his SSC and HSC degrees from Rajshahi Cadet College in 1974 and 1976 respectively. He then earned his bachelor's and master's in public administration from the University of Dhaka by 1980. He got a post-graduate diploma from the International Institute of Social Studies in Rotterdam in 1998. He then went on the get M. Phil from the University of Bergen, Norway in 2003 and a PhD degree from University of Dhaka in 2015.

== Career ==
Haque served as an associate professor at North South University, Dhaka. His responsibilities in government includes services in the Ministry of Public Administration, Cabinet Division, and in the Ministry of Education as additional secretary and joint secretary respectively.

Haque also served as Commissioner, Deputy Commissioner, Additional Deputy Commissioner, Upazila Nirbahi Officer, Magistrate and Assistant Commissioner. Furthermore,

Haque served as a deputy director and director in Bangladesh Public Administration Training Centre (BPATC).

Haque was an Economic Minister in the Embassy of Bangladesh in Washington DC in 2007.
