= Foreign Secretary of Bangladesh =

- বাংলাদেশের পররাষ্ট্র সচিব
- Government Seal of Bangladesh

- Flag of Bangladesh

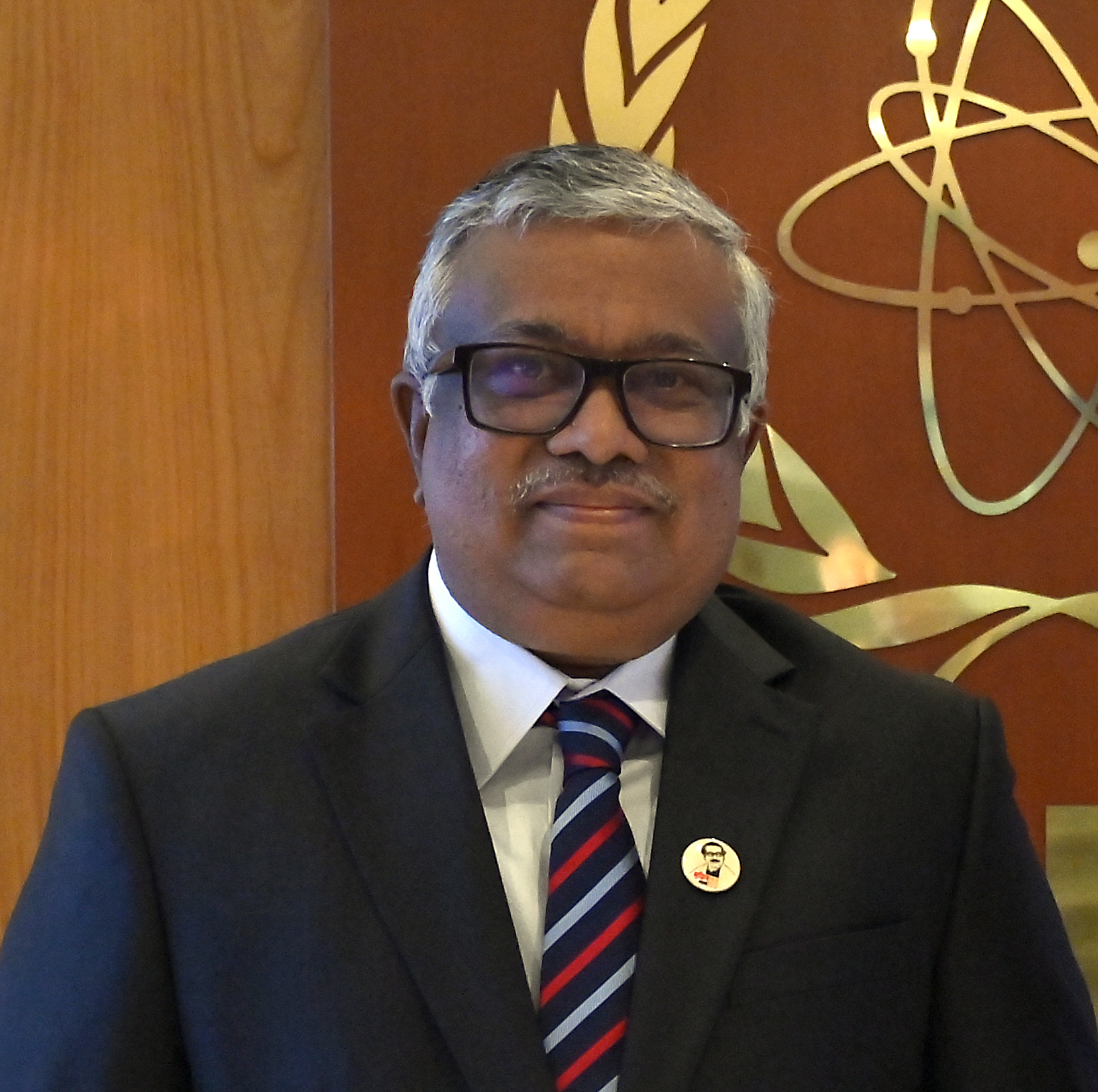
- Incumbent; Asad Alam Siam since 19 June 2025
- Ministry of Foreign Affairs
- Type: Civil Servant
- Reports to: Prime Minister
- Seat: Segunbagicha, Dhaka 1000, Bangladesh
- Appointer: Prime Minister
- Term length: Until the age of 59 Term contractually extendable
- Inaugural holder: Abul Fateh
- Formation: 16 July 1971; 55 years ago
- Salary: ৳112080 (US$910) per month (incl. allowances)
- Website: Ministry of Foreign Affairs

The Foreign Secretary is the most senior diplomat and governmental, non-political official in the Ministry of Foreign Affairs (MOFA) of the Government of Bangladesh.

The holder of the post heads all functions of their ministry, including the Foreign Service (also called Diplomatic Service) and reports to the Foreign Minister, who is the most senior political figure with responsibilities for Foreign Affairs.

The current Foreign Secretary is Md. Ruhul Alam Siddique. The first Foreign Secretary was Abul Fateh.

== List of foreign secretary ==
No.	Image	Name	From	To
1		Abul Fateh	30.12.1971	16.01.1972
2		Sayyid Anwarul Karim	17.01.1972	14.07.1972
3		Enayet Karim	14.07.1972	16.02.1974
4		Fakhruddin Ahmed	22.10.1974	15.11.1975
5		Tabarak Hussain	15.11.1975	06.09.1978
6		Shah A M S Kibria	06.12.1978	02.05.1981
7		Humayun Rashid Choudhury	16.06.1981	01.06.1982
8		A.H. Ataul Karim	01.06.1982	07.10.1984
9		Faruq Ahmed Choudhury	07.10.1984	17.07.1986
10		Fakhruddin Ahmed	17.07.1986	08.05.1987
11		A. K. M. Nazrul Islam	09.05.1987	19.07.1988
12		Mohammed Mohsin	19.07.1988	25.06.1989
13		A.K.H Morshed	25.06.1989	21.10.1989
14		Abul Ahsan	05.11.1989	19.09.1991
15		Reaz Rahman	19.09.1991	13.12.1993
16		M.R. Osmany	13.12.1993	09.02.1995
17		Farooq Sobhan	07.03.1995	16.09.1997
18		Mustafizur Rahman	16.09.1997	27.02.1999
19		C.M Shafi Sami	23.03.1999	26.01.2001
20		Syed Muazzem Ali	11.03.2001	17.07.2001
21		Shamsher M. Chowdhury	24.10.2001	17.03.2005
22		Hemayet Uddin	17.03.2005	10.12.2006
23		Md. Touhid Hossain	17.12.2006	08.07.2009
24		Mohammed Mijarul Quayes	09.07.2009	02.12.2012
25		Shahidul Haque	10.01.2013	30.12.2019
26		Masud Bin Momen	31.12.2019	01.09.2024
27		Md. Jashim Uddin	08.09.2024	23.05.2025
28		Md. Ruhul Alam Siddique	23.05.2025	19.06.2025
29		Asad Alam Siam	20.06.2025	
