= Syed Najmuddin Hashim =

Bangladeshi journalist, politician, and writer

- সৈয়দ নাজমুদ্দিন হাশিম

Ambassador of Bangladesh to the Soviet Union
- In office 6 May 1984 – 28 July 1986
- Preceded by: Mirza Rashid Ahmad
- Succeeded by: Rezaul Karim

Ambassador of Bangladesh to Myanmar
- In office 18 August 1980 – 24 June 1982
- Preceded by: Zahiruddin
- Succeeded by: Keramat Ali

Personal details
- Born: 1 June 1925 Dhaka, Bengal Presidency, British India
- Died: 18 August 1999 (aged 74) Dhaka, Bangladesh
- Education: Dhaka College; Presidency College Calcutta
- Occupation: Journalist, politician, and writer

Syed Najmuddin Hashim (1 June 1925 – 18 August 1999) was a Bangladeshi journalist, politician, and writer.

== Early life ==
Hashim was born on 1 June 1925 in Dhaka in the then Bengal Presidency, British India. In 1942, he graduated from St Gregory's High School and from Dhaka College in 1944. In 1946 he graduated with a B.A. in English from Presidency College Calcutta.

== Career ==
Hashim started his career as a journalist. From 1948 to 1962 he worked in Radio Pakistan including as editor and broadcaster. From 1962 to 1964 he worked in the Industrial Development Bank as the chief public relations officer. From 1966 to 1968 he was the deputy director of Bureau of National Research and Reconstruction. From 1968 to 1970, he was the first secretary at the Pakistan Embassy in France. From 1970 to 1972, Hashim was the executive director of Pakistan Council. From 1974 to 1975 he served as the managing director of Bangladesh Film Development Corporation after which he was appointed joint secretary to the Ministry of Information.

From 1975 to 1979, Hashim served as a director general at the Ministry of Foreign Affairs. From 1979 to 1980, he was stationed in the Bangladesh High Commission in London as the press minister. From 1980 to 1982, he was the high commissioner of Bangladesh to Singapore and the ambassador to Myanmar. He was the minister of information from 1982 to 1984 in the cabinet of President Hussain Mohammad Ershad. From 1984 to 1986 he was the Bangladesh ambassador to the USSR with accreditation as ambassador to Finland and Mongolia.

== Bibliography ==
He wrote a number of non-fiction books about the history and politics of Bangladesh, some were published posthumously.

- Bandishala Pakistan (1994; বন্দীশালা পাকিস্তান) ISBN 9844650399
- Ashleshar Rakshasi Belai: Smritipate Sheikh Mujib O Anyanya (1996; অশ্লেষার রাক্ষসী বেলায় : স্মৃতিপটে শেখ মুজিব ও অন্যান্য) ISBN 9844650895
- Samudyata Daiva Durbipakey (1999; সমুদ্যত দৈব দুর্বিপাকে)
- The Devottee, the Combatant: Selected Poems of Shamsur Rahman (2000) ISBN 978-9848120316
- Hopefully the Pomegranate (2007) ISBN 9789848715130
- Smrtipate Bangabandhu: Sekher samasamayika (স্মৃতিপটে বঙ্গবন্ধু : শেখের সমসাময়িক) ISBN 9787012803280
- Mosaic of a Lost Era ISBN 9789845062305
- Galda Dadad Goyendagiri (গলদা-দাদার গোয়েন্দাগিরি) ISBN 9844653460
- Shaishabkaler Dhaka O Anyanya (শৈশবকালের ঢাকা ও অন্যান্য) ISBN 9789847761893
- Russia er Dinlipi (রাশিয়ার দিনলিপি) ISBN 9789847769635

== Death ==
Hashim died on 18 August 1999 in Dhaka, Bangladesh.
