= Zahiruddin (diplomat) =

Bangladeshi politician and diplomat

- জহিরুদ্দিন

High Commissioner of Bangladesh to Pakistan
- In office 3 January 1976 – 19 May 1978
- Preceded by: Position created
- Succeeded by: A.K.M. Nazrul Islam

Ambassador of Bangladesh to Myanmar
- In office 20 June 1978 – 1 August 1980
- Preceded by: Syed Anwarul Karim
- Succeeded by: Syed Najmuddin Hashim

Abdullah Zahiruddin (died on 2 February 1980) was a Bangladeshi politician and diplomat. He was the first High Commissioner of Bangladesh to Pakistan.

== Career ==
Zahiruddin was the Minister of Education and Health of Pakistan before the Independence of Bangladesh.

In 1975, after the assassination of President Sheikh Mujibur Rahman in the 15 August 1975 Bangladeshi coup d'état, Pakistan established ties with Bangladesh. Pakistan was the first country to recognize the new administration following the coup. In December 1975, Mohammad Khurshid was appointed the first High Commissioner of Pakistan to Bangladesh and Zahiruddin was appointed the first High Commissioner of Bangladesh to Pakistan. He said it was good to be back in Pakistan. He presented his credentials to President Fazal Ilahi Chaudhry on 1 January 1976. While Zulfiqar Ali Bhutto asked how could he called Zahiruddin an ambassador and praised him as a brother in arms. During his term, Tabarak Hossain, the Foreign Secretary of Bangladesh, visited Pakistan on an official visit from 26 to 30 August 1977.

Zahiruddin was an ambassador of Bangladesh to Myanmar from 20 June 1978 to 1 August 1980. He succeeded Syed Anwarul Karim.

== Death ==
Zahiruddin died on 2 February 1980. President of Pakistan, General Muhammad Zia-ul-Haq, sent message of condolence to President of Bangladesh, Ziaur Rahman, following Zahiruddin's death.
