= Deputy High Commission of Bangladesh, Karachi =

Diplomatic mission of Bangladesh

- Location: Karachi, Sindh, Pakistan
- Address: House No. 81/1, Street No. 30, Khayaban-e-Seher, Phase VI, Defence Housing Authority
- Coordinates: 24°47′35.3″N 67°3′00.4″E
- Opened: 24 July 1976
- Jurisdiction: Sindh and Balochistan
- Deputy High Commissioner: S. M. Mahbubul Alam
- Website: karachi.mofa.gov.bd

The Deputy High Commission of Bangladesh, Karachi is a diplomatic mission of Bangladesh in Pakistan. It is located in Phase VI of the Defence Housing Authority in Karachi. The current Deputy High Commissioner is S. M. Mahbubul Alam, who was appointed in 2021. The Deputy High Commission reports to the High Commission of Bangladesh in Islamabad.

== History ==
After Bangladesh (erstwhile East Pakistan) seceded from Pakistan in 1971, diplomatic ties between the two nations were not established until February 1974, when Pakistan recognised Bangladesh. On 24 July 1976, the Bangladeshi government inaugurated a Trade Commission office in Karachi, thus establishing its diplomatic presence in the city. This closely followed the opening of the Bangladeshi embassy in Islamabad earlier that year. In 1985, the trade office was converted into a full-fledged consulate-general. In 1989, the consulate-general became a Deputy High Commission when Pakistan rejoined the Commonwealth as a member state, and has continued to function ever since.

In April 2012, the Bangladeshi Deputy High Commissioner in Karachi claimed that his mission had "received threats through emails, messages and letters" warning against a potential tour of the Bangladeshi cricket team to Pakistan, as a result of which the tour had to be called off. The Deputy High Commissioner expressed his disappointment at the tour not going ahead, which apparently soured relations between the Pakistan Cricket Board and Bangladesh Cricket Board.

In October 2014, the Deputy High Commission along with the High Commission in Islamabad were subjected to security threats after Bangladesh passed death sentences against a number of political opposition leaders for their alleged role in the 1971 war, starting with the 2013 execution of Abdul Quader Molla. Pakistan had condemned these death penalties. Pakistani authorities made arrangements to enhance the security of the Bangladeshi missions.

In March 2017, it was reported that around €33,000 had been fraudulently hacked from a bank account belonging to the Bangladeshi embassy in Berlin. The stolen amount was part of funds that were transferred by the Bangladeshi Deputy High Commission in Karachi to Berlin in late 2016, in order to procure a German Mercedes-Benz for the Karachi mission. According to Bangladeshi sources, the personal email account of the Deputy High Commissioner in Karachi had been compromised and used by the hackers, who had deceived the Berlin mission into depositing these funds into a bank account not belonging to Mercedes-Benz. The Bangladesh Bank was directed by the central government to recover the stolen money.

== Deputy High Commissioners ==
The following is an incomplete list of Bangladeshi Deputy High Commissioners, presented in chronological order. S. M. Mahbubul Alam is the currently appointed Deputy High Commissioner in Karachi.

- Riaz-ul-Hasan (c. 1990s)
- Md. Abdul Hannan (2004–2006)
- Md. Ruhul Alam Siddique (c. 2010s)
- Noor-e-Helal Saifur Rahman (2015–2021)
- S. M. Mahbubul Alam (2021–present)

== Operations ==
The Bangladeshi Deputy High Commission exercises its jurisdiction in the provinces of Sindh and Balochistan. It offers visa, consular, trade, investment and commerce-related services pertaining to Bangladesh in these regions. It also promotes economic, cultural and political relations between the two countries. The operating hours of the Deputy High Commission are from 9 am to 5 pm (PST) on weekdays. The mission is headed by a Deputy High Commissioner and a subordinate officer, known as the Second Secretary.

The Deputy High Commission plays an important role in dealing with cases of immigration. There are an estimated 700,000 to 2 million Bengalis in Pakistan, the vast majority of them residing in Karachi. A large number of them are Bangladeshi expatriates who arrived in pursuit of economic opportunities since the 1980s to support their families back home, and they are mainly employed in Karachi's textile and fishery sectors. Others used Pakistan as an overland transit destination while traveling to the Middle East and Europe, but as Pakistan's western borders became tightly controlled over the years, they became stranded in the country. The Deputy High Commission facilitates thousands of Travel Permits (TPs) for those Bangladeshi citizens who wish to return to their country due to lack of employment, family reasons, or due to their irregular visa status, but who face difficulties in doing so either due to a lack of funds or proof of identity requirement. Furthermore, the mission also provides consular access to Bangladeshi detainees imprisoned in Karachi's jails and arranges for their repatriation to Bangladesh.

== See also ==
- Bangladesh–Pakistan relations
- High Commission of Bangladesh, Islamabad
- High Commissioners of Bangladesh to Pakistan
