= Pakistan–Samoa relations =

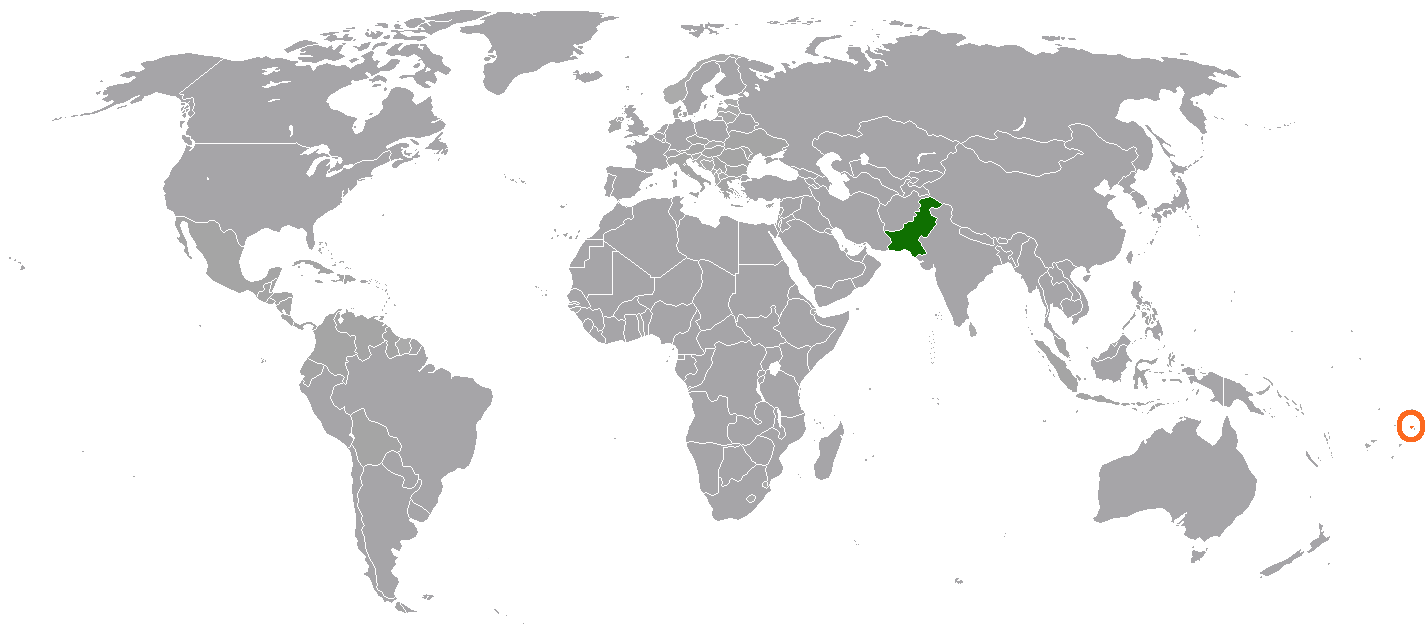

- Pakistan: Samoa

Pakistan–Samoa relations are the bilateral relations between Pakistan and Samoa. Pakistan's High Commission in Wellington, New Zealand, is concurrently accredited to Samoa. Pakistan also has an honorary consul in Apia. Both countries are members of the Commonwealth of Nations.

== History ==
Relations between Pakistan and Samoa were officially established on 7 March 1983. Both countries emerged as independent states following a common colonial past; Pakistan was formerly a part of the British Raj (1843–1947), while Samoa was a British mandate under the Dominion of New Zealand (1914–1962). The diplomatic relationship has been characterised as cordial. Both countries are member states of the United Nations (UN), Commonwealth of Nations and Group of 77, and have interacted with each other at the UN and other multilateral fora on issues of mutual interest. On 1 June 2000, Pakistani president Pervez Musharraf felicitated Samoa's head of state Malietoa Tanumafili II and prime minister Tuilaepa Aiono Sailele Malielegaoi on the occasion of Samoa's independence day:

Excellency, It gives me great pleasure to convey on behalf of the people of Pakistan and on my own behalf our warm and cordial felicitation to Your Excellency and the people of Western Samoa on the happy occasion of the National Day of Western Samoa. I wish Your Excellency's long life, health and happiness and the people of Western Samoa further progress and prosperity. Please accept, Excellency, the assurances of my highest consideration.

In May 2004, Samoa was a member of the Commonwealth Ministerial Action Group which endorsed Pakistan's readmission into the Commonwealth. In September 2014, Pakistan participated in the Third International Conference on Small Island Developing States (SIDS) hosted by Samoa. The forum sought to galvanise international support for small island nations as they transitioned to sustainable development, with a focus on climate change and renewable energy.

On 18 October 2016, Afrasiab Mehdi Hashmi became Pakistan's first High Commissioner to receive concurrent accreditation to Samoa. He was welcomed in a traditional ʻava ceremony and presented his credentials to Tui Atua Tupua Tamasese Efi during a ceremony at the head of state's residence in Apia. He held the post until October 2017. Hashmi underlined his government's desire to further strengthen the bilateral relationship, while Tupua noted the two sides had forged a "close and friendly association" in recent years in matters of peace, climate change and sustainable development, which were key areas for both governments. Tupua thanked Pakistan for its support to Samoa in the SIDS conference. During his visit, Hashmi held meetings with the prime minister and members of the Samoan Chamber of Commerce, where he focused on improving trade relations. He also donated books covering Pakistan's history and foreign relations to the Samoa Public Library, which were accepted by the chief executive of Samoa's Ministry of Education, Sports and Culture, Karoline Afamasaga-Fuata'i.

On 20 October 2016, it was announced that the president of Pakistan had appointed businessman and cricket administrator Tiumalu Geoffrey Clarke as Pakistan's first honorary consul-general in Samoa. According to the High Commissioner, the appointment provided Pakistan a diplomatic presence in Apia and enabled a "balance of what we want and desire" in the context of Pakistan–Samoa relations.

Abdul Malik is the current High Commissioner of Pakistan to Samoa. He arrived in Apia on 3 March 2019 and presented his credentials to head of state Tuimalealiifano Va'aletoa Sualauvi II at Vailele. Malik said Pakistan attached "great importance" to its relations with the South Pacific region, and that it was keen to augment political, cultural and economic ties with Samoa through its honorary consulate. Tuimalealiifano said the relationship was shaped by mutual respect and collaboration, and acknowledged the economic and environmental cooperation between both countries.

== Economic relations ==
Bilateral trade between Pakistan and Samoa is limited, and was valued at approximately US$500,000 as of 2018. Pakistan exported $454,000 worth of goods to Samoa, comprising almost entirely seafood commodities such as frozen and fresh fish. This reflected an annual growth rate of 30.4%, increasing from $5,000 in 2001. Samoa's exports to Pakistan in the same period were valued at $42,000, and consisted mainly of gas and liquid flow measuring instruments and thermostats. This constituted an annual increase of 17.2%, from $2,820 in 2003.

Samoa is reportedly one of the global tax havens where significant amounts of Pakistani capital is invested using offshore bank accounts. In October 2016, it was reported that Pakistan's Federal Board of Revenue was engaging Samoa regarding the sharing of tax information. Samoan authorities notified Pakistan that the details could be shared pursuant to a bilateral tax information exchange agreement, which had not yet been signed but which they were willing to start negotiations on. In 2017, the process to solemnize an agreement was eventually initiated.

== Cultural relations ==
Samoa has a very small Muslim community, which includes some with Pakistani connections.

Sport, including cricket, is one of the areas that bind the two nations together. In September 2015, a 13-member Pakistani contingent across four sporting disciplines competed in the fifth Commonwealth Youth Games held in Apia.

== See also ==
- Foreign relations of Pakistan
- Foreign relations of Samoa
