= New Zealand–Pakistan relations =

- Pakistan: New Zealand

New Zealand–Pakistan relations refer to the international relations between New Zealand and Pakistan. Pakistan has a High Commission located in Wellington while New Zealand has an honorary consulate in Karachi. New Zealand was party to the Commonwealth Heads of Government decision to readmit Pakistan to the Councils of the Commonwealth after the restoration of civilian rule in May 2008.

== High level visits ==
The New Zealand Minister of Foreign Affairs and Trade, Phil Goff, visited Pakistan during late 2004.

In 2005 Pakistani President Pervez Musharraf visited Prime Minister Helen Clark in New Zealand. During his talks with New Zealand leaders, Musharraf highlighted areas such as education, information communication technologies (ICT), agriculture and dairy, on which he proposed the two governments to build closer links. New Zealand and Pakistan signed a deal to boost their efforts in the fight against terrorism.

== Assistance ==
New Zealand created a mine clearance training programme in Quetta, Pakistan, for Afghan refugees. In October 2005 following the devastating earthquake New Zealand's Aid Minister Marian Hobbs announced the country was doubling its aid contribution to $1.5 million. Pakistani television gave prominent coverage to New Zealand's quick response to the disaster and the messages of condolence from the Prime Minister Helen Clark and Foreign Minister Phil Goff. At least ten New Zealand NGOs were accepting donations from the public to help the victims, according to Rae Julian (Executive Director, Council for International Development) commenting in the immediate aftermath of the earthquake in Pakistan and tragedy in Guatemala the "response of the New Zealand government and the public to the weekend's two tragedies has already been outstanding." In November 2005 the New Zealand Red Cross reported that the public had donated over $620,000 to the New Zealand Red Cross Pakistan earthquake appeal which was the largest "public response to a disaster since the South Asia tsunami."

In April 2007, Trade Minister Phil Goff launched a pilot ‘Waste to Energy’ project in Landhi, near Karachi, Pakistan. The project designed by New Zealand firm Empower Consultants turns animal waste into energy and fertilizer. The Landhi Cattle Colony which supplies milk to Karachi always had a problem with waste disposal, the monsoon rains would wash it away causing health hazards.

Goff added that "The New Zealand organisations and others that have played a central role in developing this important project can be justly proud of their achievement and the project will also add another important dimension to our growing bilateral relationship with Pakistan".

In February 2009, after a meeting in Islamabad between Ms. Shehnaz Wazir Ali the Chairperson Higher Education Commission (HEC) and Hamish MacMaster, High Commissioner of New Zealand for Pakistan it was announced that the HEC would promote linkages with educational institutions in New Zealand. The HEC has thus far sent 111 scholars to New Zealand 48 in Massey University and 63 in the University of Auckland.

== Trade ==
New Zealand exports to Pakistan in 2004 were worth $24.4 million, by 2007 they rose to NZ$ 85 million. Exports from Pakistan to New Zealand were worth NZ$ 67.2 million. Bilateral trade is limited to NZ$137 million as of April 2012 and has exhibited only moderate growth over the last decade. The majority of New Zealand's exports consist of pumps, dairy products, wool products and other animal products, while Pakistan exports are mainly textiles such as linen, cereals and apparel/carpets.

Pakistan and New Zealand had signed a trade agreement in 1990. As part of this agreement both sides will have to hold meeting of the JTC, which had been delayed for almost 22 years. After a 22-year gap, the inaugural session of the Pakistan New Zealand Joint Trade Committee (JTC), was held at Wellington, New Zealand in March 2012 to review the entire gamut of bilateral trade and ways and means to further enhance the economic co-operation.

== Sport ==
Cricket is quite popular in both nations and teams of both countries have competed against each other in international matches. However the security situation in Pakistan has been a concern for the New Zealand cricket team, in 2002 New Zealand Cricket announced it would send manager Jeff Crowe to assess the security situation following an earlier cancellation - as the situation seemed to be improving. In 2008, when Pakistan was hosting the Champions Trophy, New Zealand toured Pakistan to play three matches following Australia's decision to postpone their tour until March 2009. However, in 2009, following the attack on the Sri Lankan team in Lahore, Pakistan, New Zealand Cricket announced it would most likely call off its December tour of Pakistan.

== Migration ==
There are around 5,000 Pakistanis who live in New Zealand.

== Human rights concerns ==
New Zealand has expressed its concerns over human rights standards in Pakistan, both bilaterally and multilaterally on a number of occasions.

== Military ==
Both New Zealand and Pakistan were a part of the South East Asian version of NATO called SEATO also known as a 'mutual defense pact'.

== See also ==
- Pakistani New Zealander
