= F-6, Islamabad =

F-6 ایف ۶
- Sector
- Interactive map of F-6
- Coordinates: 33.4241°N 73.223°E
- Country: Pakistan
- Territory: Capital Territory
- Zone: I
- Union Council: 28

Government
  - Body: Islamabad Metropolitan Corporation
- Postal Code: 44220

F-6 (Urdu: حلقہ ایف ۶) is a sector of Islamabad. The sector is located at the foothills of Margalla Hills of Islamabad.

== Subdivisions ==
F-6 is a square-shaped sector. It has been further divided into 4 residential sub-sectors along with 1 commercial central- division. Each residential sub-sector has at least 1 small market. With a grand market located at the heart of F-6 sector, each sub-sector surrounds the grand market.

- F-6/1: It consists of the southwestern portion of the sub-sector. Surrounded by School Road and Agha Khan Road to the North, Garden Road & China Chowk Underpass to the East, Nazim-ud-Din Road to the South and Justice Abdul Rashid Road to the West. F-6/1 Children's Park is located here. With the popular Bengali samosa located there, the small market in F-6/1 is Farooqia Market.
- F-6/2: It comprises North-Western portion of the sub-sector. Surrounded by Margalla Road to the north, Hill Road to the east, School Road to the south, and Justice Abdul Rashid Road to the west. Islamabad Model College for Girls-Shalimar College, Islamabad College for Girls F-6/2 and Christian Colony also known as "100 Quarters" are located here. The small market in F-6/2 is Firdous Market.
- F-6/3: It comprises North-Eastern portion of the sub-sector. Surrounded by Margalla Road to the North, Atatürk Avenue to the East, Agha Khan Road and School Road to the South, and Hill Road to the West. Hashoo Park (popularly known as Haunted Hill Park), Children's Park and CDA Park are located here. The small market in F-6/3 is Kohsar Market.
- F-6/4: It comprises South-Eastern portion of the sub-sector. Surrounded by Agha Khan Road to the North, Atatürk Avenue to the East, Nazim-ud-Din Road to the South, and Garden Road and China Chowk Underpass to the West. The famous second-hand Furniture Market is located here. The small market in F-6/4 is Abbas Market.
- F-6 Markaz: It forms the central commercial area, also known locally as Super Market.
