= National Alien Registration Authority =

Defunct agency of the Government of Pakistan

National Aliens Registration Authority (NARA)

Agency overview
- Formed: 2000; 26 years ago
- Dissolved: 2015; 11 years ago
- Type: Government database
- Headquarters: Karachi

The National Alien Registration Authority (NARA) was a former institution of the Government of Pakistan, under the Ministry of Interior and Narcotics Control, for the main purpose of legally registering and documenting immigrants and other foreign residents in the country.

NARA was established in 2000, and was headquartered in the City of Karachi.

NARA was formally merged into the National Database and Registration Authority (NADRA) in 2015.
