= Iqbal Hussain Khan =

Bangladeshi diplomat

Md. Iqbal Hussain Khan
- মোহাম্মদ ইকবাল হোসেন খান
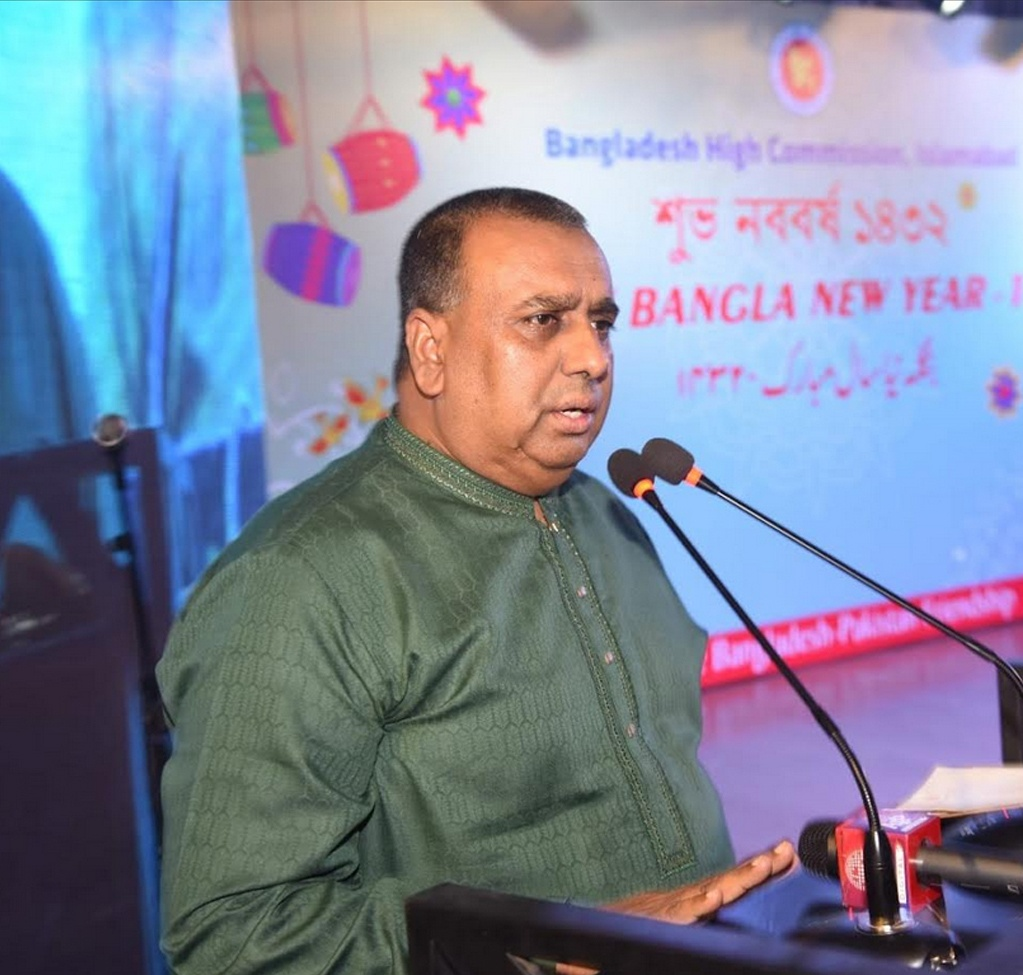
- Khan in 2025

High Commissioner of Bangladesh to Pakistan
- Incumbent
- Assumed office 12 December 2024
- Preceded by: Md. Ruhul Alam Siddique

Personal details
- Citizenship: Bangladesh
- Education: People’s Friendship University of Russia; Khulna University of Engineering & Technology
- Occupation: Diplomat

Mohammad Iqbal Hussain Khan is a Bangladeshi diplomat and the High Commissioner of Bangladesh to Pakistan.

== Early life and education ==
Khan holds a Master's degree in International Relations from the People's Friendship University of Russia. He did his bachelors in Electrical and Electronic Engineering from the then Bangladesh Institute of Technology, Khulna (now Khulna University of Engineering & Technology). Additionally, he completed the National Defence Course at the National Defence College.

== Career ==
Khan joined the Ministry of Foreign Affairs (Bangladesh) in 2001 as part of the 20th batch of the Bangladesh Civil Service. Throughout his diplomatic career, he has served in various capacities in Bangladesh Missions in Jeddah, London, Moscow, and Abu Dhabi. He served as the Consul General of Bangladesh in Dubai.

Within the Foreign Ministry in Dhaka, he held the position of Director General of the West Asia Wing and later served as Director General of the Foreign Service Academy. In August 2024, he was appointed the High Commissioner of Bangladesh to Pakistan replacing Md. Ruhul Alam Siddique. He oversaw improvement in the Bangladesh-Pakistan relations following the fall of the Sheikh Hasina-led Awami League government in Bangladesh.

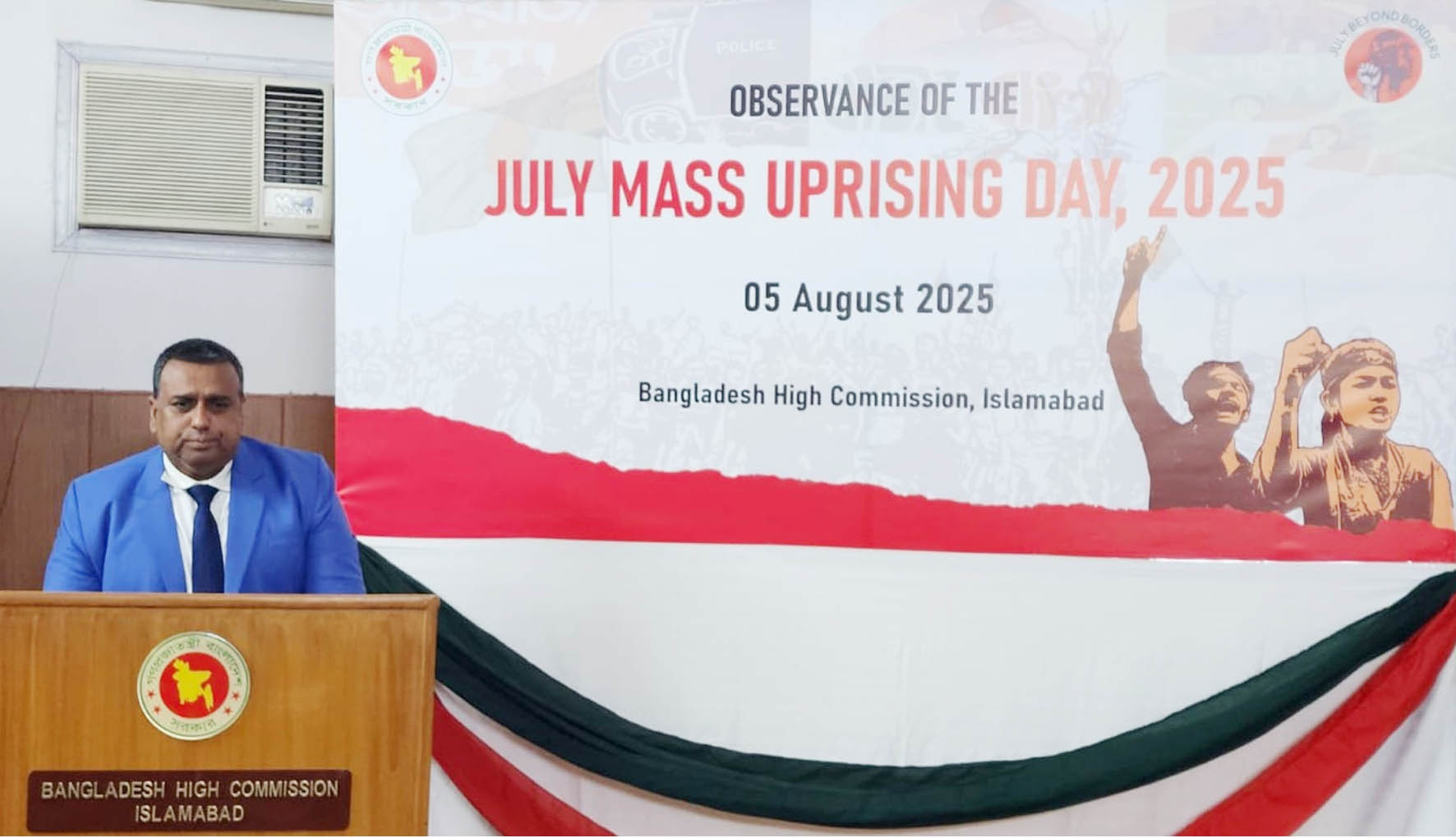
Speech by Mohammad Iqbal Hossain Khan at the July Mass Uprising Day Event, Bangladesh High Commission, Islamabad

== Personal life ==
Khan is married and has two daughters.
