= M. Anwar Hashim =

Bangladeshi diplomat and ambassador

High Commissioner of Bangladesh to Pakistan
- In office 22 October 1991 – 31 October 1993
- Preceded by: C. M. Shafi Sami
- Succeeded by: Q. A. M. A. Rahim

M. Anwar Hashim is a retired Bangladeshi diplomat and ambassador. He was the Permanent Representative of Bangladesh to the United Nations Office in Geneva. He was the ambassador of Bangladesh to the Vatican.

== Career ==
Hashim was the charge d'affaires ad interim of the Bangladesh Embassy in China in 1981. Hashim was the director general of the Southeast Asian and Pacific Affairs Division of the Ministry of Foreign Affairs. He was appointed ambassador of Bangladesh to Bulgaria and Romania.

On 22 October 1991, Hashim was appointed High Commissioner of Bangladesh in Pakistan replacing C. M. Shafi Sami. In November 1993, Q. A. M. A. Rahim replaced him at the High Commission. He was then appointed ambassador of Bangladesh to the Vatican. December 1996, Hashim was appointed principal of the Bangladesh Foreign Service Academy replacing Ambassador Humayun Kabir. Md. Touhid Hossain succeeded him in January 1999. He then served as the Permanent Representative of Bangladesh to the United Nations Office in Geneva.

Hashim called for a foreign policy based on national consensus between political parties in 2010. He was the president of Centre for Sustainable Development.

Hashim attended the book launch of Begum Khaleda Zia: Her Life, Her Story by Mahfuz Ullah in 2018. On the imprisonment of former Prime Minister Khaleda Zia, he said, "Undoubtedly this imprisonment is enriching Khaleda Zia. Her political wisdom is getting stronger. People’s sympathies are rising towards the BNP chairperson. It is also increasing her popularity,".

== Personal life ==
Hashim was married to Ranju Hashim (died 18 October 2023), granddaughter of Ranada Prasad Shaha. They needed permission from the government of Pakistan to get married as they came from two different religions.
