= Bangladesh–Pakistan relations =

- Pakistan: Bangladesh

Diplomatic mission
- High Commission of Pakistan, Dhaka: High Commission of Bangladesh, Islamabad

Envoy
- High Commissioner Imran Haider: High Commissioner Iqbal Hussain Khan

People's Republic of Bangladesh and Islamic Republic of Pakistan are both South Asian Muslim-majority countries and founding members of SAARC, as well as members of the Developing 8 Countries, the G77, the OIC and the Commonwealth of Nations. Both are classified as Next Eleven emerging economies. Bangladesh has a High Commission in Islamabad and a Deputy High Commission in Karachi. Pakistan has a High Commission in Dhaka.

Modern territory of Bangladesh formed the eastern wing of Pakistan for 24 years following the Partition of India, until the Bangladesh Liberation War in 1971 resulted in the secession of East Pakistan as Bangladesh. During the war, Pakistani Forces carried out genocide against the Bengali population of East Pakistan and raped thousands of Bengali women. Pakistan recognized Bangladesh in 1974 during the Islamic Summit in Lahore; however relations between the two countries remained frozen until the July Uprising in Bangladesh, which resulted in the overthrow of Sheikh Hasina and the establishment of a new administration in Dhaka that sought to normalize ties with Pakistan, moving away from decades of strained relations rooted in the events of the 1971. In the aftermath of the July Uprising, both countries initiated a series of high-level diplomatic exchanges, reopened stalled trade negotiations, and signalled a willingness to enhance cooperation in areas such as regional security, cultural exchange, and economic development. Observers noted that this rapprochement marked the most substantial improvement in bilateral relations since the 1970s, with both sides emphasizing reconciliation, diplomacy, and a shared interest in stability across South Asia.

According a research by Pew Research Center in 2026, 54% Bangladeshis held favourable views on Pakistan, compared to 35% who held unfavourable view. On the other side, 66% Pakistanis expressed favourable views on Bangladesh, compared to 22% who expressed unfavourable view.

== History ==
=== Pre-partition era ===
When the East India Company conquered Punjab in 1849, a substantial portion of its Indian staff that settled around Lahore was Bengali.

=== Partition and liberation ===
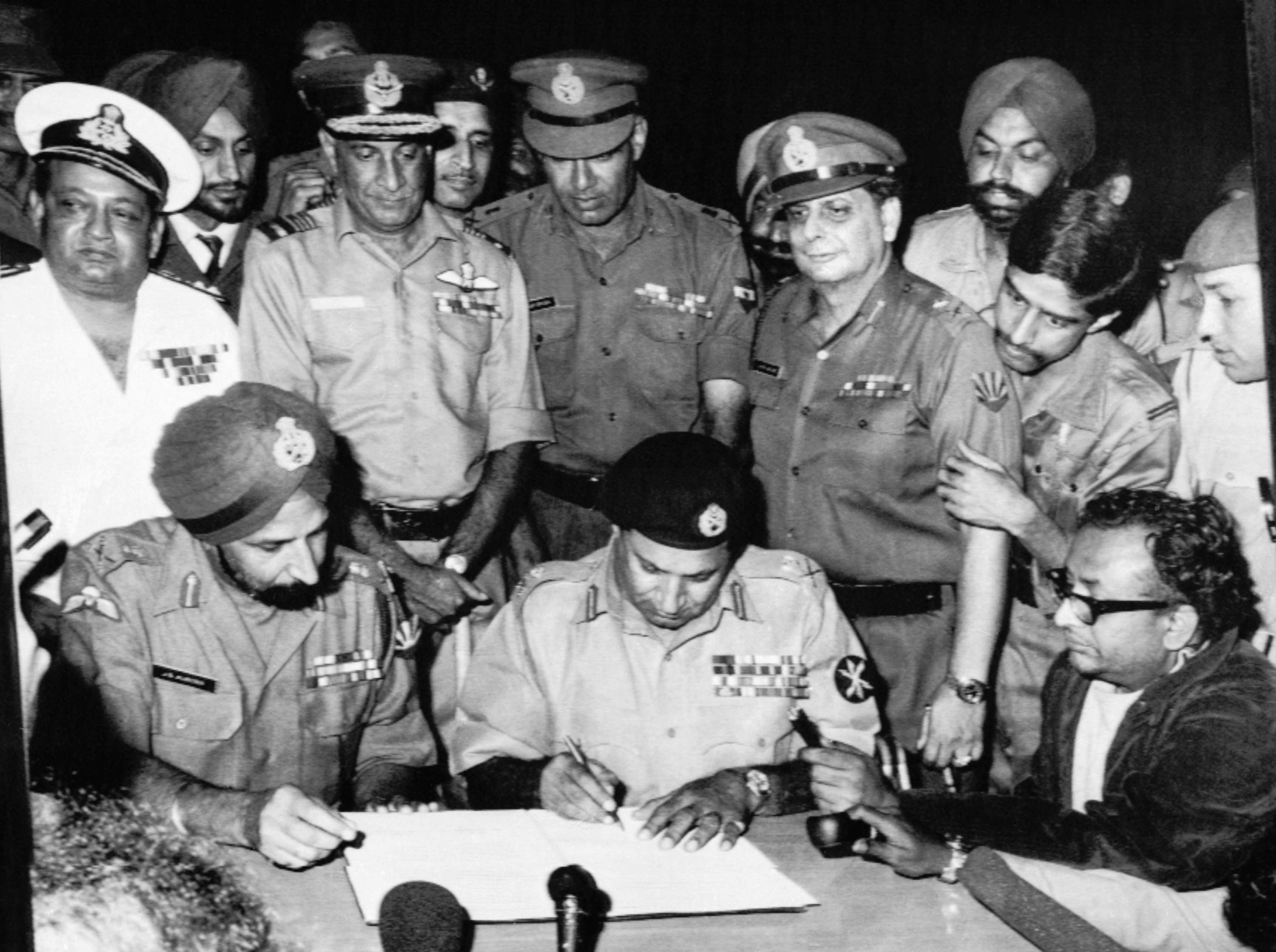
Pakistani general signing the instrument of surrender in the presence of Indian and Bangladeshi military personnel, after the 1971 war.

As part of the Partition of India in 1947, Bengal was partitioned between the Dominion of India and the Dominion of Pakistan. The Pakistani part of Bengal was known as East Bengal until 1955 and thereafter as East Pakistan following the implementation of the One Unit program.

Bilateral relations between the two wings grew strained over the lack of official recognition for the Bengali language, democracy, regional autonomy, disparity between the two wings, ethnic discrimination, and the central government's weak and inefficient relief efforts after the 1970 Bhola cyclone, which had affected millions in East Pakistan. These grievances led to several political agitations in East Bengal and ultimately a fight for full independence. In early March 1971, 300 Biharis were slaughtered in rioting by Bengali mobs in Chittagong. The massacre was used by the Pakistan Armed Forces as a justification to launch "Operation Searchlight", which targeted intellectuals, political activists, Hindus and other minorities. The number of people killed by Pakistani forces remains disputed, with estimates ranging from 300,000 to 3 million. About 8–10 million people became refugees in India. Many Bengali policemen and soldiers mutinied, and nationalists formed a guerrilla force, the Mukti Bahini, with Soviet and Indian support.

When the Indo-Pakistani war of 1971 broke out between West Pakistan and India, the joint forces of India and Mukti Bahini (later known as the Bangladesh Armed Forces) defeated Pakistani forces in East Pakistan. Subsequently, the independent state of Bangladesh was created.

=== 1974–2012: Establishment and growth of bilateral relations ===
The left-oriented Pakistan Peoples Party (PPP), led by Zulfikar Ali Bhutto, who had been the main political opponent of Sheikh Mujibur Rahman, came into power in the aftermath of Bangladesh's separation from Pakistan. Initially, Pakistan was not in favor of recognizing Bangladesh and urged other states to hold back their recognition until Pakistan could enter into a dialogue with Bangladeshi leadership. Bangladesh, on its part, insisted on recognition as a pre-condition for dialogue. In 1972, Pakistan left the Commonwealth after some members of the Commonwealth extended membership to Bangladesh. Pakistan also severed ties with other countries that recognized Bangladesh.

On the issue of Bangladesh's application for membership to the UN, China, at Pakistan's request, exercised its veto power for the first time to stall the move, which helped Pakistan to secure in a bargain the release of its prisoners of war and the return of troops to their pre-war positions.

In 1974, the relationship between Bangladesh and Pakistan thawed. Sheikh Mujibur Rahman withdrew the bans on some pro-Pakistan organisations that had operated before Bangladesh's independence. Mujib visited Lahore for an OIC Islamic summit, and in return, the Parliament of Pakistan authorized Bhutto to extend recognition to Bangladesh. In June 1974, Pakistani Prime Minister Zulfiqar Ali Bhutto visited Bangladesh and paid homage to Bangladesh's war memorial at Savar. Both nations discussed an agreement in 1975 in which Bangladesh agreed to take up half of Pakistan's pre-1971 external reserves provided Bangladesh received half of the country's pre-1971 assets and credit. The matter went unresolved.

Relations normalized quite under the governments of Ziaur Rahman and Hussain Muhammad Ershad in Bangladesh, which had grown more distant from its usual allies, like India and Russia. Five Pakistani heads of government have made official visits to Bangladesh since the 1980s, and numerous trade and cultural agreements have been signed. Common concerns over terrorism have influenced strategic cooperation, leading to a gift of several squadrons of F-6 fighter aircraft to the Bangladesh Air Force in the late 1980s. Although there was no serious effort to maintain them, as they were later left to be destroyed by a cyclone. Trade between the two countries stood at $340 million in 2010, which was described by the deputy high commissioner of Bangladesh, Ruhul Alam Siddique, as "negligible when you take in to account the combined population" of the two countries. Areas he hoped would induce investment from Pakistan to Bangladesh included the textiles and energy sectors.

In 1985, Pakistani President Muhammad Zia-ul-Haq visited the Bangladeshi war memorial, and said, "Your heroes are our heroes." Bangladeshi President Ershad visited Islamabad in 1986. In 1998, Prime Minister Sheikh Hasina visited Pakistan. In July 2002, Pakistani General Pervez Musharraf also visited the war memorial and said, "Your brothers and sisters in Pakistan share the pain of the events of 1971."

However, relationships suffered miserably under the first term of Khaleda Zia from 1991 to 1996, who oversaw the deportation of 30,000 Biharis from Bangladesh. During an India–Pakistan cricket match, several Biharis were killed for supporting Pakistan, and Pakistani flags were burned. Khaleda Zia refused to take in Bengalis returning from Pakistan.

In his history of Bangladesh, Craig Baxter gives a general assessment of the relations between both countries:

As united Pakistan, both the countries of Pakistan and Bangladesh had sought independence from India in 1947 because they were concerned about the progress and security of Muslims in a Hindu majority state. As separate countries they continue to share a community of interests in limiting the dominance of India as well as a common Islamic position.

=== 2013: War crimes tribunal ===
In December 2013, Bangladesh Jamaat-e-Islami Islamist leader Abdul Quader Molla, dubbed the "butcher of Mirpur", was executed in Bangladesh for war crimes. Following the execution, the lower house National Assembly of Pakistan issued a statement condemning the execution, claiming it to be politically motivated. Pakistan's Interior Minister expressed sadness that Molla was executed for his "loyalty towards Pakistan".

As a result of Pakistan's reactions, Bangladesh summoned the Pakistani High Commissioner, conveying its displeasure at Pakistan's interference in its internal matters. Bangladesh conveyed its displeasure at the National Assembly statement, the Punjab Provincial Assembly statement, as well as the remarks by Pakistan's Interior Minister. Protesters in Bangladesh also took to the streets to express their displeasure by marching towards the Pakistan High Commission in Dhaka.

=== 2015–2016: Diplomatic rifts ===
In two separate incidents, officials of the Pakistani High Commission in Dhaka were alleged to be financing the terrorist activities of the banned Jamaat-ul-Mujahideen Bangladesh organization. Diplomatic official Mazhar Khan was charged by Bangladesh's foreign ministry with running an illegal Indian currency business in Dhaka beside alleged links with militants. However, Pakistan's foreign office maintains that allegations against him are baseless and the incident is unfortunate.

In December 2015, Pakistan withdrew the diplomat Farina Arshad after Bangladeshi authorities asked the diplomat to leave for reportedly having "extended financial support to a suspected militant who faces spying charges". Jama 'Atul Mujahideen Bangladesh (JMB) operative Idris Sheikh, who also holds Pakistani nationality, had claimed he had received money from her and was in contact with her for some time. Pakistan has withdrawn one of its diplomats from Bangladesh after "harassment", the foreign ministry said. A formal statement from Islamabad dismissed the charges as "baseless", adding, "an incessant and orchestrated media campaign was launched against her on spurious charges".

In January 2016, Islamabad asked Dhaka to recall senior diplomat Moushumi Rahman from its High Commission in Islamabad within 48 hours. Diplomatic sources in Islamabad told the media that Rahman was allegedly involved in "anti-state activities in Pakistan" and that concerned security agencies continued to monitor her.

=== 2018 to present: Normalization ===
Following the election of Imran Khan as Prime Minister of Pakistan, the two countries slowly began to normalize ties. Khan made a phone call to Sheikh Hasina in July 2020 following Bangladesh's foreign policy announcement of "friendship to all and malice to none", inviting her to Islamabad. Hasina later mentioned that she was interested in strengthening bilateral ties with Pakistan. Following a meeting with Shahriar Alam on 7 January 2021, the Government of Pakistan removed all visa requirements for Bangladeshi citizens.

There have been efforts to improve relations after the resignation of Sheikh Hasina in August 2024. In November 2024, for the first time since the independence of Bangladesh, a Pakistani cargo ship docked in Chittagong Port, while in October the government of Bangladesh ended the practice of "mandatory 100% physical inspection" for Pakistani imports.

During an official visit to Dhaka on 23 July 2025, Pakistan's Interior Minister Mohsin Naqvi met with Bangladesh's Home Adviser Lieutenant General (Retd) Md Jahangir Alam Chowdhury at the Secretariat. The two officials held comprehensive discussions across several areas of bilateral interest, including counter-terrorism, anti-narcotics, police training, anti-human trafficking, cybercrime, the Rohingya crisis, visa facilitation, and enhanced trade. A near-finalised Memorandum of Understanding (MoU) was announced to grant on‑arrival visa access for holders of diplomatic and official passports, aimed at easing travel and boosting cooperation. Naqvi offered Bangladesh access to Pakistan's counterterrorism experience and proposed MoUs between their police academies for officer exchange programs and training.

In May 2026, Pakistan launched the "Pak-Bangladesh Knowledge Corridor," an initiative to enhance educational and research collaboration between the two countries. The program includes fully-funded "Allama Scholarships" for Bangladeshi students in Pakistani universities, higher education expos, and leadership training for Bangladeshi civil servants.

== Contentions ==
=== Unresolved issues of 1971 ===
In October 2024, Bangladeshi Foreign Adviser Md. Touhid Hossain said that it would be easier to normalize relations if Pakistan apologizes for the events of '71. On 19 December 2024, Chief Adviser of Bangladesh Muhammad Yunus and Prime Minister of Pakistan Shehbaz Sharif met on the sidelines of the D8 summit in Egypt, where Yunus urged Sharif to resolve the unsolved issues of 1971. Sharif asserted that main issues had been resolved though the 1974 Shimla Agreement, and if there were other outstanding issues, he also would have liked an overview. The two leaders also expressed their desire to extend cooperation in new areas such as the sugar industry and dengue management.

On 17 April 2025, Bangladesh again demanded a formal public apology from Pakistan for the atrocities committed against it during the 1971 Liberation War. Bangladesh also reiterated its demand for the repayment of $4.5 billion it claims is owed by Pakistan, the repatriation of more than 300,000 stranded Pakistanis, the equitable distribution of undivided Pakistan's financial and institutional assets, and the long-ignored transfer of international aid originally meant for victims of the 1970 Bhola cyclone. Bangladeshi Foreign Secretary Md. Jashim Uddin stated that the country had raised "historically unresolved issues" with Pakistan during his meeting with Pakistani counterpart Amna Baloch at the Padma State Guest House. According to Moonis Ahmar, professor of international relations at the University of Karachi, while Pakistan has agreed to "symbolically" discuss the issue, "it doesn't mean that Pakistan will accept those demands."

=== Residency issues ===
==== Bengalis in Pakistan ====
There has been a presence of people from modern-day Bangladesh in present-day Pakistan going back generations, even during the times of the British Raj. This continued from 1971 onwards and extended into the 1980s, when massive numbers of Bangladeshis entered Pakistan. This led to a crackdown by the government of Benazir Bhutto in the 1990s, after public resentment and complaints of crime and social unrest. Today, there are about an estimated two million unregistered Bangladeshis in Pakistan. There has been a small number of Bangladeshi expatriate students studying in Pakistan, but that number has been on the decline, mainly due to security concerns in the country.

An estimated two million ethnic Bengalis in Pakistan, many of whom have lived there since before 1971, face systemic discrimination and exploitation. Despite being born in the country, they are denied citizenship, voting rights, and access to public services like education and healthcare. The digitization of ID cards and creation of NARA in 2000 reclassified many as "aliens," stripping them of legal identity. Statelessness pushes Bengali children into poverty and marginalization, with blocked futures. Advocacy groups continue to demand recognition, but Pakistan's bureaucracy perpetuates their exclusion and human rights violations.

==== Biharis in Bangladesh ====
An issue of continuing controversy is the status and return of Biharis (also called Stranded Pakistanis (Note: Although Biharis are commonly referred to as "stranded Pakistanis", their origin is mainly in Bihar, today a state in India)) to Pakistan. Numbered around 540,000, these communities had migrated to what became East Pakistan from the Indian state of Bihar after the partition of India in 1947. During the Bangladesh Liberation War, these communities supported the Pakistani government and later wanted to emigrate to Pakistan, which stalled and hesitated. By 1982, about 127,000 had been repatriated, leaving about 250,000 people still demanding repatriation. In 1985, there was some progress in this area when Pakistani president Zia-ul-Haq agreed to accept the "stranded Pakistanis." In a 2002 visit to Bangladesh, Pakistani president Pervez Musharraf signed numerous bilateral agreements but said he could not allow the emigration of Biharis to Pakistan for the time being.

== Defence relations ==
Defence relations improved considerably under the reigns of Ziaur Rahman and Hussain Muhammad Ershad in Bangladesh, which had grown more distant from its war ally, India. Common concerns over India's regional power have influenced strategic cooperation leading to a gift of several squadrons of J-6 fighter aircraft to the Bangladesh Air Force in the late 1980s.

In August 2024, the Yunus interim government ordered a "fresh supply of artillery ammunition from Pakistan", which included 40,000 ammunition rounds, 2900 high-intensity projectiles and 40 tonnes of RDX in "wax consistency".

In August 2026, Bangladesh's Foreign Affairs Adviser Humaiun Kobir stated that Bangladesh maintains a positive approach towards joining a potential economic or defence framework involving Saudi Arabia, Pakistan and Turkey, guided by its "Bangladesh First" policy and national interests. He also noted that Prime Minister Tarique Rahman's visit to Riyadh is likely to be finalised soon, while Dhaka is strengthening bilateral ties with Pakistan in trade and people-to-people connectivity.

== Bilateral trade ==
Bilateral trade between the two countries has been growing slowly over the past years. During the eleven-year period between 2000–01 and 2010–11, Pakistan's exports to Bangladesh grew at an average annual rate of 27.6 percent, and imports from Bangladesh grew at the rate of 9.2 percent. The total value of trade (export plus import) between the two countries in 2010-11 was about $983 million. To give a boost to bilateral trade between Pakistan and Bangladesh, both countries have decided to finalize a bilateral Free Trade Agreement. FTA will pave the way for opening trade opportunities and will help the expansion of trade between the two countries. In November 2024, a cargo ship sailed directly from Pakistan to Bangladesh for the first time in decades. Major Bangladeshi exports to Pakistan include textiles, agricultural products, leather footwear, and other leather products. In fiscal 2022–23, Bangladesh's imports exceeded $68 billion, of which goods imported from Pakistan amounted to $699 million. Exports to Pakistan were around $74 million during the period. Most of the imported goods consist of raw materials for the garment industry.

According to the Pakistan Business Council, in addition to cotton, the list of goods imported by Bangladesh from Pakistan includes salt, sulphur, earth and stones, plastering materials, lime, edible vegetables, raw hides and skins, machinery, inorganic chemicals, man-made staple fibres, plastics, tanning or dyeing extracts, and edible fruits and nuts.

In 2025, Bangladesh and Pakistan signed 1 bilateral agreement regarding visas and 5 MoUs on cultural exchange and trade business.

There have been no direct flights between the two countries for decades. However, Biman Bangladesh Airlines has announced that it will operate direct Dhaka–Karachi flights from 29 January 2026.

== See also ==
- Bangladesh–Pakistan Confederation
- Bangladesh–India relations
- Dead Reckoning: Memories of the 1971 Bangladesh War
- Foreign relations of Bangladesh
- Foreign relations of Pakistan
