= Accession of Bangladesh to ASEAN =

Accession process of Bangladesh to ASEAN

ASEAN (blue) and Bangladesh (red)

Flag of Bangladesh

The accession of Bangladesh to the Association of Southeast Asian Nations (ASEAN) refers to an ongoing attempt by the Bangladeshi government to gain membership status within ASEAN. Whilst formal expressions of interest emerged in the early 2020s, the origins of Bangladesh's aspirations date back to the 1970s. Its rejection led to the eventual establishment of the South Asian Association for Regional Cooperation (SAARC) in 1985, which closely drew structural inspiration from ASEAN's model.

While the country has long maintained bilateral relations with ASEAN member states and participated in the ASEAN Regional Forum since 2006, it began actively pursuing closer institutional ties, initially seeking Sectoral Dialogue Partner (SDP) status, and eventually signaling intent for full membership. This aspiration gained renewed momentum following a change in government in 2024, when the caretaker administration under Chief Adviser Muhammad Yunus elevated ASEAN accession as a top foreign policy priority. Bangladesh has since secured expressions of support for ASEAN membership from three of the 11 ASEAN member states: Laos, Indonesia, and Malaysia, though ASEAN has not yet set a formal timeline or pathway for accession. As of 2025, Bangladesh continues to lobby for SDP status as a strategic entry point into the bloc, while positioning itself for eventual full membership in the future. Since then, Bangladesh has garnered support from Indonesia, Malaysia, Brunei, Timor-Leste, the Philippines, Singapore, and Cambodia for SDP status.

On July 2026, ASEAN Secretary-General Kao Kim Hourn declared that it is not possible for Bangladesh to join ASEAN due to its geographic location outside of southeast Asia, unless the alliance amends its charter which is unlikely.

== Accession requirements ==
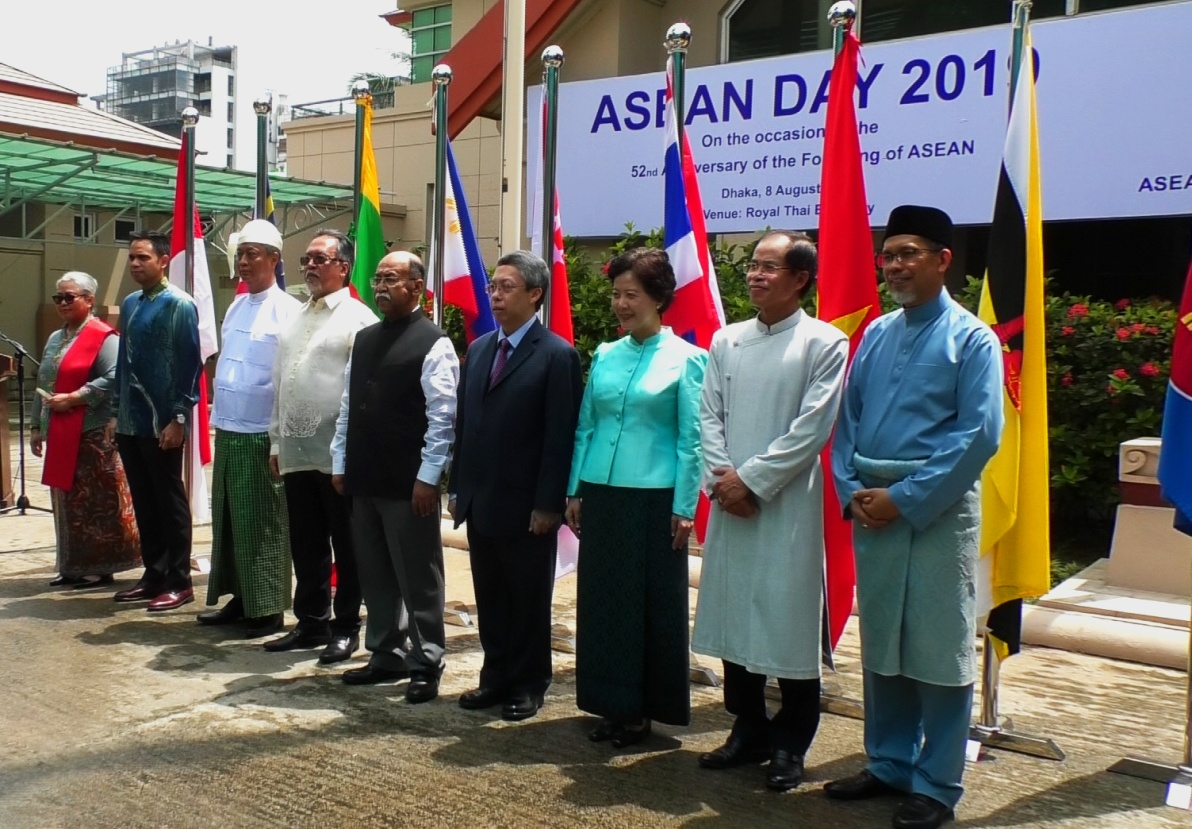
Bangladesh and the Dhaka Committee commemorating ASEAN Day at the Royal Thai Embassy in Dhaka, 2019

The ASEAN Charter defines the following criteria for membership:

- The state must be geographically located in Southeast Asia.
- The state must be recognized by all ASEAN member states.
- The state must agree to be bound by the ASEAN Charter
- The state must be able and willing to carry out the obligations of membership, such as:
  - Maintaining embassies in all current member countries of the bloc
  - Attending all ministerial meetings and summits
  - Acceding to all treaties, declarations, and agreements in the bloc

=== Bangladesh membership issues ===
Since the beginning of Bangladesh's overtures toward ASEAN accession, a complex array of obstacles has shaped the trajectory of its bid. Although Bangladesh has expressed sustained interest, its efforts have been met with both cautious encouragement and institutional inertia. One of the earliest and persistent challenges has been ASEAN's geographic and historical self-definition. Bangladesh, as a South Asian country, lies outside the traditional scope of Southeast Asia, prompting doubts over whether its inclusion would stretch ASEAN's regional identity beyond its original parameters. This geographic scope has not been fully enforced. Myanmar, Vietnam, and Indonesia themselves are transcontinental countries that span both Southeast Asia and East Asia in the cases of Vietnam and Myanmar or between Southeast Asia and Oceania in the case of Indonesia. The observer state Papua New Guinea is culturally and geographically located entirely within Oceania. Eastern Bangladesh and Northeast India have strong cultural ties with Mainland Southeast Asia and are considered transregional areas between South Asia and Southeast Asia (see also: Eastern South Asia and Southeast Asian relations with Northeast India). Observers argue that regional definitions can drift and change over time.

One of the structural impediments to Bangladesh's potential accession to ASEAN lies in the organization's consensus-based decision-making model, which requires unanimous agreement among all member states for major initiatives, including enlargement. This mechanism allows individual member states to block or delay progress, particularly where national interests diverge. A notable complication is the presence of Myanmar, whose ongoing tensions with Bangladesh over the unresolved Rohingya refugee crisis present a significant diplomatic obstacle. Myanmar may oppose Bangladesh's entry directly or adopt delaying tactics. More broadly, ASEAN's preference for non-confrontational, humanitarian responses over political interventions has limited its willingness to address contentious bilateral issues, potentially stalling the accession process through institutional inertia. Secretary of the Regional Organisational Wing of the Ministry of Foreign Affairs, M. Forhadul Islam, believed that the accession process could also be influenced by neighbouring India, stemming from its growing relationship with ASEAN.

Domestically, Bangladesh faces the challenge of proving its readiness to contribute effectively to the ASEAN community. While the country has recorded robust economic growth and development in recent years, questions persist regarding the preparedness of its emerging industries to compete within ASEAN's integrated market framework. Observers have expressed concerns that premature exposure to ASEAN's free trade mechanisms could leave Bangladesh vulnerable to asymmetric competition, particularly from more developed economies such as Vietnam, Malaysia, and Singapore. This has prompted debate over whether Bangladesh's economic base is sufficiently diversified and resilient to reap the benefits of deeper regional integration. Analysts argued that joining ASEAN, including at the level of a dialogue partner, would require some forms of institutional reforms, trade liberalization, and a set-in-stone regional diplomatic posture that Dhaka has not historically prioritized.

== Chronology of relations with ASEAN ==
Timeline
Date	Event
28 July 2005	Bangladesh joins the ASEAN Regional Forum (ARF) as its 26th member. Inaugurated in a meeting in Kuala Lumpur, Malaysia.
1 August 2007	Bangladesh accedes to the Treaty of Amity and Cooperation in Southeast Asia. Signed in Manila by Iftekhar Ahmed Chowdhury.
2 April 2014	Establishment of the "Dhaka Committee" among ASEAN embassy missions.
8 October 2020	Bangladesh formally applies to become an ASEAN Sectoral Dialogue Partner.

=== Foreign relations with ASEAN member states ===
- Philippines (24 February 1972)
- Indonesia (25 February 1972)
- Myanmar (21 March 1972)
- Malaysia (11 September 1972)
- Singapore (10 September 1972)
- Thailand (5 October 1972)
- Vietnam (11 February 1973)
- Brunei (5 May 1984)
- Laos (1988)
- Cambodia (17 February 1993)
- Timor-Leste (7 June 2002)

== History ==
=== Early history ===
In the late 1970s, Bangladesh's President Ziaur Rahman explored the possibility of joining the Association of Southeast Asian Nations (ASEAN) as a means to broaden the country's alliances. Following his rise to power via a 1975 coup d'état, Ziaur Rahman sought ASEAN membership in an effort to legitimize his new administration on the international stage. Bangladesh formally applied to join ASEAN, but this request was turned down by the existing Southeast Asian members. ASEAN's refusal stemmed from the grounds of maintaining organizational cohesion, particularly due to concerns over Bangladesh's governance structure at the time, not long after the coup d'état. ASEAN also held wariness toward expanding westward.

Having been rebuffed by ASEAN, Bangladesh turned its focus to building its own regional bloc. In May 1980, Ziaur Rahman formally proposed the creation of a South Asian cooperative forum, drawing inspiration from ASEAN's success. He consulted leaders of India, Nepal, Sri Lanka, and others on forming an "ASEAN-like" organization for South Asia. This initiative led to the founding of the South Asian Association for Regional Cooperation (SAARC) in 1985, with Bangladesh as a co-founder. Zia would be honoured by the South Asian Association for Regional Cooperation for his statesmanship and vision. Throughout the 1980s, Bangladesh remained outside ASEAN and instead prioritized SAARC for regional collaboration. During this period there were no further Bangladeshi attempts to join ASEAN, as the country concentrated on the new South Asian forum and strengthening bilateral ties with Southeast Asian nations separately.

=== ASEAN Partnership ===
While full membership in the Association of Southeast Asian Nations (ASEAN) remained unattained, Bangladesh progressively deepened its engagement with ASEAN-affiliated frameworks during the 1990s and 2000s. A significant milestone was its role as a founding member of the Bay of Bengal Initiative for Multi-Sectoral Technical and Economic Cooperation (BIMSTEC) in 1997 as a linkage between South and Southeast Asian countries, signalling its interest in closer integration with the ASEAN neighbourhood.

During this period, Bangladesh's regional posture was shaped by frustrations over the limited progress of economic cooperation within the South Asian Association for Regional Cooperation (SAARC) and the perceived dominance of India, which surrounds Bangladesh and maintains a persistent trade surplus with it. In response, the Bangladeshi government initiated a "Look East" policy in 2002, aiming to strengthen diplomatic and economic ties with Southeast and East Asian countries. This strategic pivot reflected a desire to diversify partnerships and integrate more fully with the dynamic economies of the broader Asia-Pacific region. At the 12th ASEAN Regional Forum (ARF) on 28 July 2005, a major step came when Bangladesh was admitted to the ARF, ASEAN's security dialogue platform, as its 26th participating country, allowing Bangladesh to regularly consult with ASEAN states on political and security issues, even if it was not an ASEAN member.

The following year, Bangladesh acceded to ASEAN's foundational Treaty of Amity and Cooperation (TAC) on 1 August 2007, signed at an ASEAN-ARF meeting in Manila. Foreign Affairs Adviser Iftekhar Ahmed Chowdhury called this a "red-letter day in the history of Bangladesh's foreign policy."

In 2011, Laos announced that it would support Bangladesh in obtaining ASEAN observer status, the first ASEAN member to do so. This assurance was made during a credentials ceremony at Bangabhaban, where newly appointed Lao Ambassador Thongphanh Syackhaphom presented his credentials to President Zillur Rahman. Laos has historically supported Bangladesh's aspiration to deepen its engagement with ASEAN and has maintained cooperative relations at various international forums, going as far as supporting Bangladesh's early inclusion in ASEM.

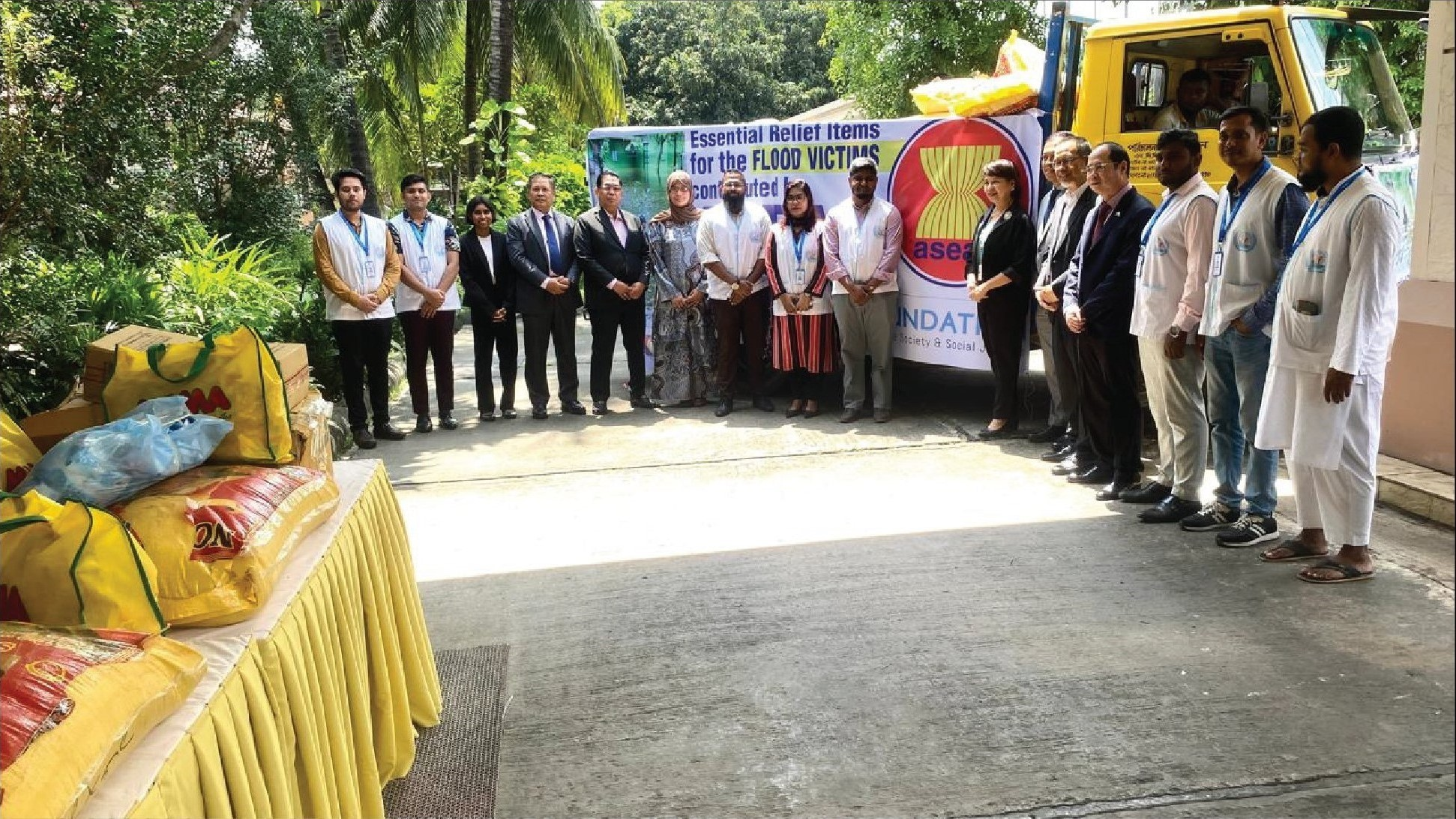
ASEAN Dhaka Committee (ADC) presented humanitarian assistance during the October 2024 flood, distributed through Bangladesh's Help Foundation

In early 2014, Bangladesh stepped up institutional ties with ASEAN. In May 2014, Bangladesh's ambassador to Indonesia, Md. Nazmul Quaunine, was accredited as the country's first ambassador to ASEAN. He presented credentials to ASEAN's Secretary-General on 6 May 2014. That month the Dhaka Tribune editorialized that Bangladesh should "speed up efforts for Bangladesh to join ASEAN," noting the mutual economic benefits of membership. As a prelude to become an ASEAN Dialogue Partner, the "Dhaka Committee" was created as a coordinated platform among the eight ASEAN diplomatic missions in Dhaka, Brunei, Indonesia, Malaysia, Myanmar, the Philippines, Singapore, Thailand, and Vietnam, to enhance ASEAN's engagement and visibility in Bangladesh and serves primarily to organize the promotion of Southeast Asian studies, cultural events like ASEAN Day celebrations, and frequently, humanitarian initiatives such as joint flood-relief efforts.

In August 2017, the Bangladesh government publicly declared its interest in becoming a "Sectoral Dialogue Partner" of the Association of Southeast Asian Nations (ASEAN), with the State Minister for Foreign Affairs, Md Shahriar Alam, formally stating the bid during the 50-year celebration of ASEAN's founding in Dhaka.

During Vietnamese President Tran Dai Quang's state visit to Dhaka on 5–6 March 2018, Prime Minister Sheikh Hasina sought Vietnam's support for Bangladesh's bid to become an ASEAN Sectoral Dialogue Partner (SDP) as part of her broader call to intensify political, trade, and economic relations with ASEAN countries. She also requested Vietnam's backing for Bangladesh to join the Mekong-Ganga Cooperation (MGC) forum. President Tran Dai Quang agreed to give both requests due consideration in consultation with ASEAN and MGC member countries.

In 2020, Dhaka began actively pursuing ASEAN ties at the "sectoral dialogue partner" level, with Foreign Minister A. K. Abdul Momen canvassing support from ASEAN capitals. A clear on-record marker came on 8 October 2020, when during the Thai ambassador's farewell call in Dhaka, he sought Thailand's support for Bangladesh's candidature for ASEAN Sectoral Dialogue Partner status.

In October 2022, Brunei's Sultan Hassanal Bolkiah made a state visit to Dhaka. The Bangladesh–Brunei joint statement from that visit explicitly "appreciated Bangladesh's continued interest to strengthen its relations with ASEAN" and "assured its support for Bangladesh's bid to become a Sectoral Dialogue Partner of ASEAN."

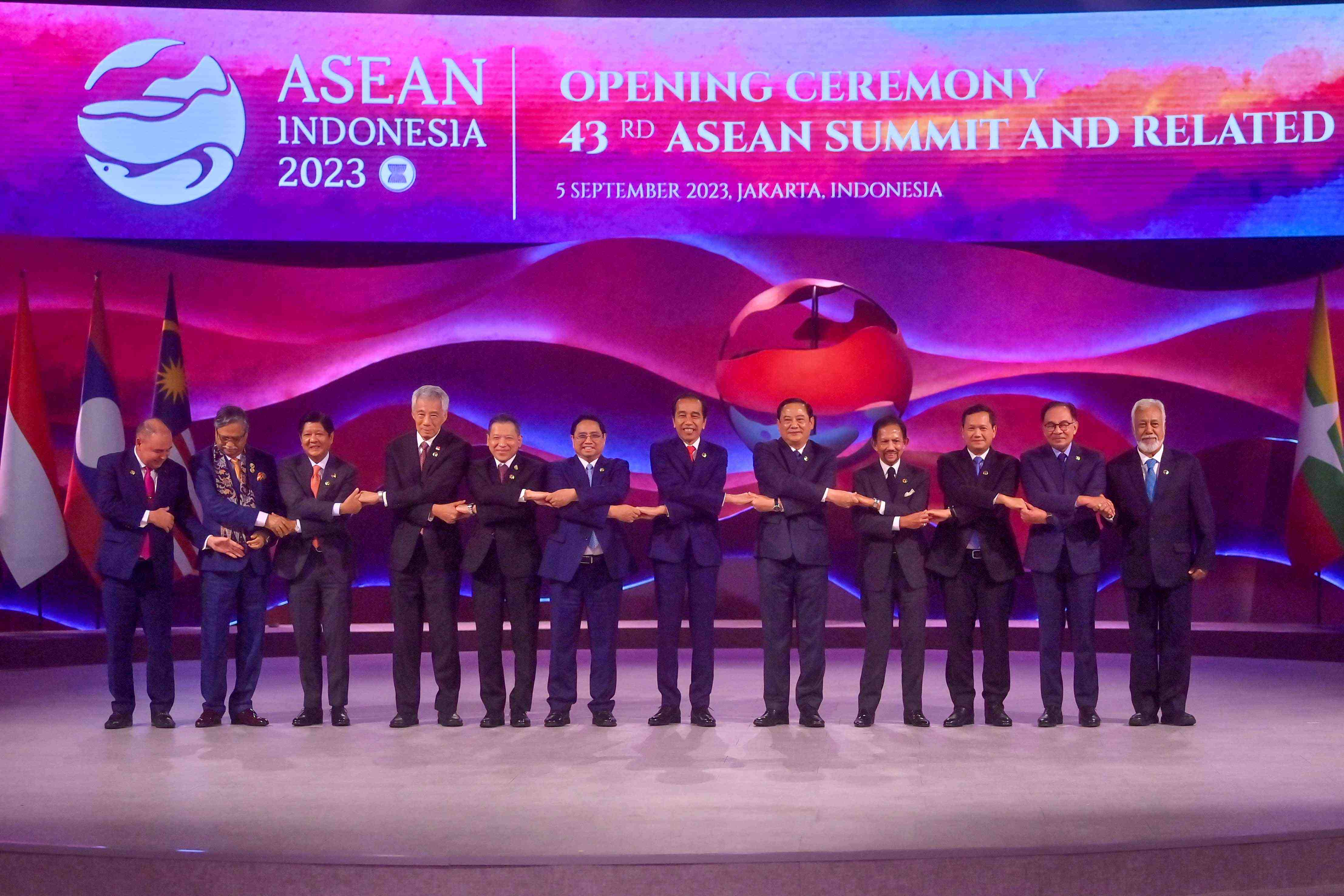
Cook Islands, Bangladesh, and ASEAN leaders doing the "ASEAN Handshake" during the opening ceremony of the 2023 ASEAN Summit

In July 2023, Foreign Minister AK Abdul Momen led the Bangladeshi delegation to the 30th ARF in Jakarta. In ARF speeches, he pushed ASEAN members to take the country as a sectoral dialogue partner, urging ASEAN members to provide active support to Bangladesh's candidacy for attaining Sectoral Dialogue Partner status by the next ASEAN Summit.

On the sidelines of that July 2023 meeting, Momen met ASEAN Secretary-General Kao Kim Hourn in Jakarta. The Secretary-General assured of extending full support to Bangladesh's effort to become an ASEAN sectoral dialogue. Momen also held a bilateral with Indonesia's foreign minister (Indonesia was ASEAN chair in 2023) and specifically requested Jakarta's help in securing a consensus on Bangladesh's SDP bid at the upcoming ASEAN Summit. On 13 July 2023, Momen then met Singapore's Foreign Minister Vivian Balakrishnan on the same forum and raised Bangladesh's bid to become an ASEAN Sectoral Dialogue Partner (SDP), urging Singapore to help expedite that effort. In response, Singapore assured full support for Bangladesh's endeavour to attain SDP status with ASEAN as part of broader discussions on expanding bilateral cooperation in trade, investment, and other sectors.

Towards the end of 2023, Bangladesh's foreign minister made similar overtures. In November 2023, at a Foreign Service Academy event in Dhaka, Momen reiterated that Bangladesh was willing to become a Sectoral Dialogue Partner (SDP) of ASEAN to deepen ties. He highlighted Bangladesh's contributions to regional issues (e.g., the Rohingya refugee situation) and renewed Dhaka's commitment to the ASEAN process.

On 26 February 2024, the Asean Dhaka Committee (ADC), an informal grouping of the heads of eight ASEAN diplomatic missions in Dhaka representing Brunei, Indonesia, Malaysia, Myanmar, the Philippines, Singapore, Thailand, and Vietnam, held assurance to Bangladesh of their backing for its bid to become an ASEAN Sectoral Dialogue Partner (SDP), after Bangladesh's Foreign Minister Hasan Mahmud requested their support with a view to attaining the status by the next ASEAN Summit in Vientiane in October 2024.

=== Bid for membership ===
==== 2024 ====
2024 saw major political changes in Bangladesh, which accelerated ASEAN-related initiatives. After a domestic uprising in July–August 2024, Prime Minister Sheikh Hasina's government was replaced by a caretaker administration headed by Muhammad Yunus. Starting August 2024, the new chief adviser (interim head) Yunus made ASEAN accession a high-profile goal. On 27–29 August 2024, he met Malaysia's High Commissioner in Dhaka, Haznah Md Hashim, during a visit at the State Guest House Jamuna. He would explicitly sought Kuala Lumpur's support for Bangladesh's bid to join ASEAN. Malaysia (which was to chair ASEAN in 2025) responded positively, the High Commissioner said she would convey Yunus's request to the relevant authorities and expressed Kuala Lumpur's willingness to work with the interim government. Analysts interpret Bangladesh's eastward diplomatic orientation as a strategic recalibration, potentially signaling a departure from what has been described as an "India-centric foreign policy" under Prime Minister Sheikh Hasina. This shift has been viewed by some as a response to perceived Indian influence over Bangladesh's domestic and foreign affairs. In this context, deeper engagement with Southeast Asia, particularly through aspirations to join ASEAN, is seen as a move to diversify regional partnerships and reduce reliance on India's geopolitical orbit. SAARC itself has remained ineffective, primarily due to persistent geopolitical tensions between India and Pakistan, as well as the ongoing instability in Afghanistan. These challenges have contributed to the prolonged suspension of the organization's activities and hindered regional integration efforts.

On 3 November 2024, during a meeting with Indonesia's ambassador in Dhaka, Yunus appealed for Indonesia's support in Bangladesh's ASEAN bid, stressing its crucial importance for the country. Previously, Yunus had also discussed the membership ambition with Malaysia's Prime Minister Anwar Ibrahim during the latter's visit to Bangladesh, given that Malaysia would chair ASEAN in 2025. It was also reported that Anwar Ibrahim was supportive of Bangladesh's due process towards its membership goal. Indonesia's envoy, Heru Subolo, responded positively, affirming that Indonesia was ready to support Bangladesh's interim government and would closely monitor Bangladesh's application to join ASEAN. It was reported that Indonesia had supported Bangladesh's bid for membership.

On 15 December 2024, President José Ramos-Horta of East Timor paid a historic official visit to Bangladesh, the first by a Timorese head of state, at the invitation of Yunus. The visit, marked by ceremonial receptions and bilateral talks, focused on strengthening cooperation in trade, microcredit, education, healthcare, ICT, and disaster management. Both leaders signed agreements on visa exemption for diplomatic passport holders and the establishment of a bilateral consultation mechanism. Timor-Leste had also assured support for Bangladesh's ASEAN Sectoral Dialogue Partnership bid and for the repatriation of displaced Rohingya once they've become a full member state within ASEAN. The two Nobel Peace Laureates also jointly called for global peace and conflict resolution. President Ramos-Horta participated in Bangladesh's 54th Victory Day celebrations and delivered a keynote on global peace challenges.

==== 2025 ====
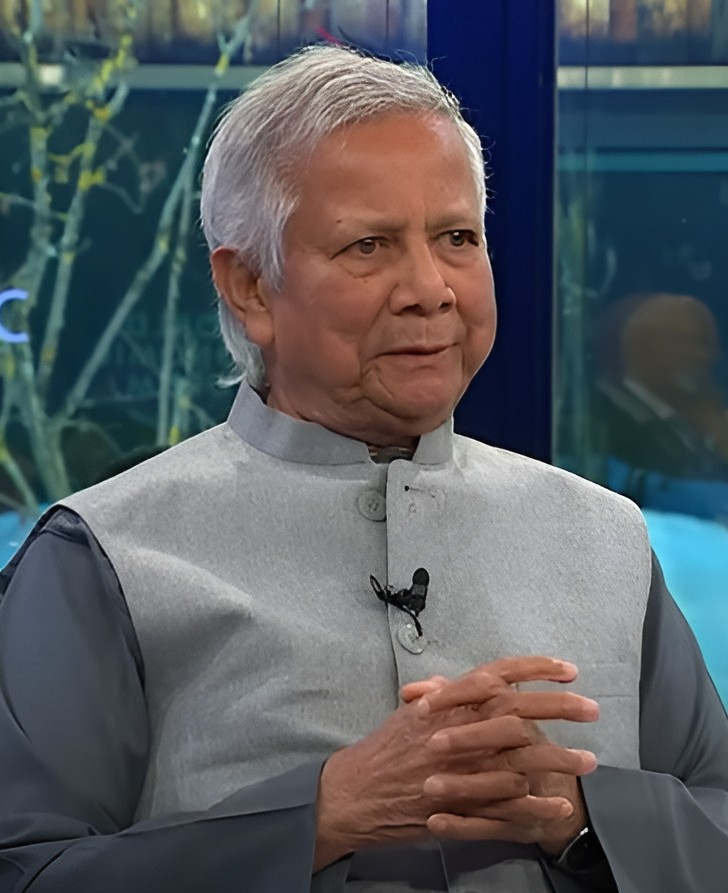

[ASEAN's] future looks very bright. What kind of future do we see for ourselves as a region, as a country?

Do we follow the same footsteps that the West has done as a success, as [the] same developmental paradigm that we have learned?

— Muhammad Yunus, addressing Bangladeshi citizens at the World Economic Forum on ASEAN Futures, 25 January 2025,

At the 2025 World Economic Forum in Davos, Muhammad Yunus expressed strategic appeal for Bangladesh to join ASEAN. Emphasizing his long-standing personal and professional ties with ASEAN member states, particularly Malaysia, Indonesia, and Vietnam, he stated that Bangladesh was already spiritually and practically part of the ASEAN community. Citing his involvement in the adoption of Grameen Bank-style microcredit programs across Southeast Asia, Yunus highlighted shared development experiences and mutual cooperation. He urged ASEAN to formally accommodate Bangladesh, addressing that "We are already part of ASEAN, We cannot take it away from us." He described the membership bid as a collective endeavor, expressing optimism by stating that "this is what we're looking forward to." He further argued for an inclusive future shaped by regional values. Calling for a new, equitable economic model within ASEAN, Yunus envisioned Bangladesh's membership as a natural and beneficial step, reinforcing his belief that ASEAN and Bangladesh should grow and progress together.

On 18 February 2025, at a Bangladesh Institute of International and Strategic Studies (BIISS) conference, Foreign Secretary Md. Jashim Uddin declared that attaining ASEAN Sectoral Dialogue Partner status had become "one of the top foreign policy agendas" for Bangladesh. He said that since Aug 2024, the government was "pursuing the matter closely with the ASEAN members for their support".

On 4 April 2025, Yunus attended the BIMSTEC summit in Bangkok, Thailand, and used the opportunity to court Thai support. At a breakfast with Thai political and business leaders, he declared that Bangladesh's "ultimate goal is to join ASEAN as a full member," after first becoming a sectoral dialogue partner. He sought backing from top figures in Thailand, including former Prime Minister Abhisit Vejjajiva, and other ASEAN states like Indonesia and Malaysia for Bangladesh's membership aspirations.

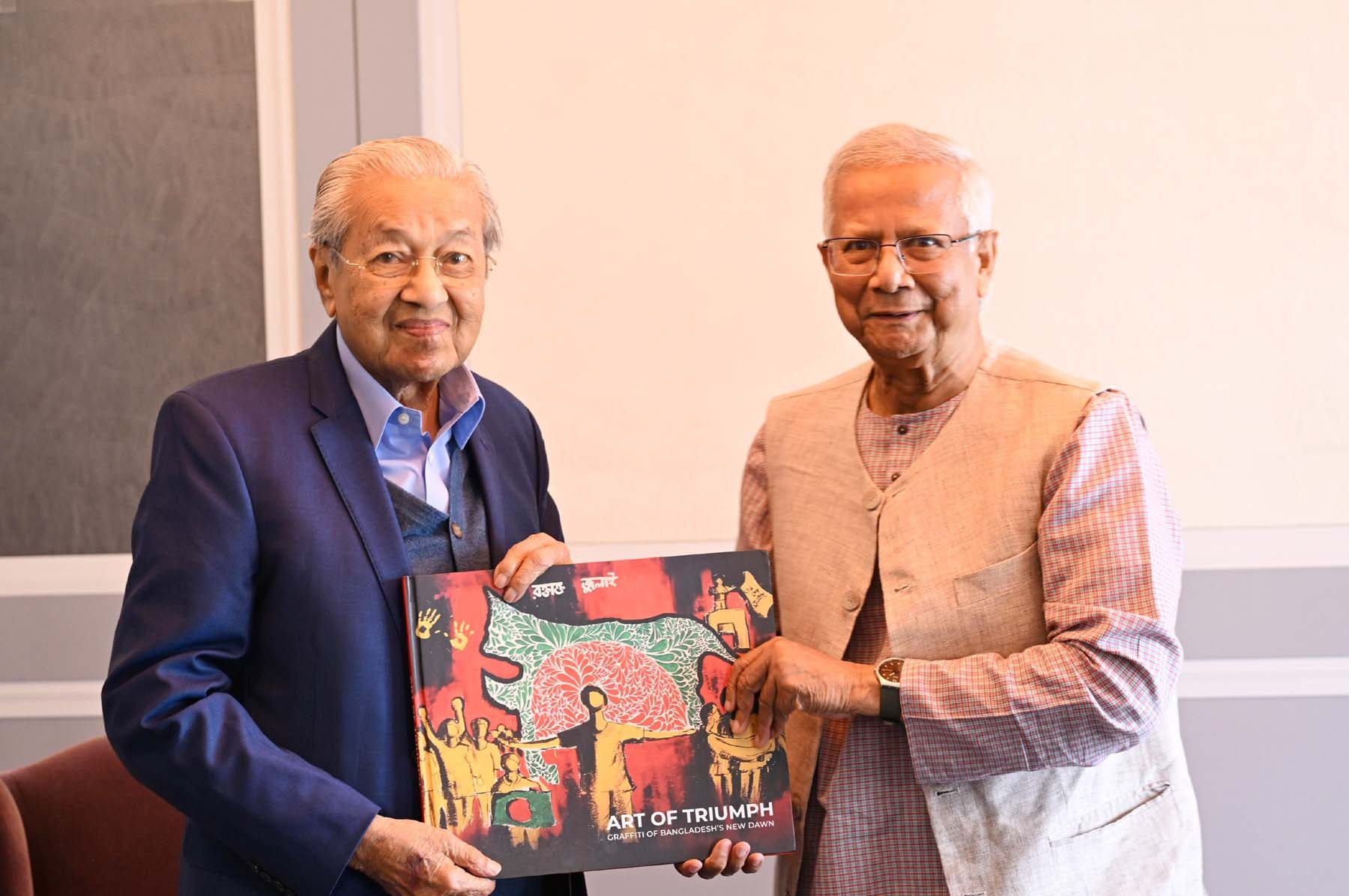
Yunus meeting former Malaysian Prime Minister Mahathir Mohamad at the Nikkei "Future of Asia" conference in Tokyo, 25 May 2025.

On 29 May 2025, Yunus met former Malaysian Prime Minister Mahathir Mohamad on the sidelines of the Nikkei "Future of Asia" conference in Tokyo. Yunus asked Mahathir to leverage his influence to help Bangladesh in its ASEAN membership bid, emphasizing that Dhaka "needed Malaysia's support" as ASEAN chair to advance the bid. Mahathir reportedly pledged his support for the notion and said he would "always remain a friend of Bangladesh" in this effort. Though supportive of Bangladesh's observer status, Mahathir held some concerns on Bangladesh's process, notably on the problems of geography, as he believes that Bangladesh was "geographically too far from what is currently defined as Southeast Asia."

Segments within the Malaysian government had pledged support to Bangladesh's membership aspirations. On 3 June 2025, the Malaysian government, represented by Deputy Minister of Investment, Trade and Industry, Liew Chin Tong, publicly expressed support for Bangladesh's bid to join ASEAN. He urged the regional bloc to seriously consider the proposal, citing Bangladesh's expanding economic capacity and its increasing strategic relevance within the broader Indo-Pacific framework. On 25 June, the high commissioner of Bangladesh to Malaysia, M. Shameem Ahsan, believes that Bangladesh's desire to become part of ASEAN's sectoral dialogue partner would be a good first step to full membership.

On 8 July, Bangladesh's foreign affairs adviser, Md. Touhid Hossain, attended an ARF summit. On 11 July, Hossain reaffirmed Bangladesh's interest in enhancing cooperation with ASEAN and reiterated the country's aspiration to attain the status of a sectoral dialogue partner within the regional organization.

On 27 July, Muhammad Yunus renewed the calls to join ASEAN after meeting with Nurul Izzah Anwar, vice president of Malaysia's People's Justice Party and daughter of Prime Minister Anwar Ibrahim. Yunus called for Malaysia's support in its bid to become a sectoral dialogue partner and eventual full member of ASEAN. Expressing hope that Malaysia, as ASEAN chair, would play a proactive role, he also emphasized Bangladesh's recent political reforms following the ousting of the Hasina regime through a youth-led uprising. The chief adviser encouraged Malaysian investment, citing Bangladesh's young population as an economic advantage. The meeting was also attended by officials Lutfey Siddiqi and Lamiya Morshed.

On 24 September, during a meeting at the UN Headquarters in New York City with Finnish president Alexander Stubb, Muhammad Yunus publicly reaffirmed that Bangladesh was pursuing ASEAN membership in tandem with efforts to revive SAARC cooperation after dormancy. He reiterated his continued efforts in achieving Sectoral Dialogue partner as part of a larger effort for eventual full membership. Around the same time, ASEAN-led meetings under the Regional Comprehensive Economic Partnership (RCEP) framework acknowledged Bangladesh's interest in joining the trade pact, with all members in agreement to accept Bangladesh, Hong Kong, Chile, and Sri Lanka into the RCEP framework. In a later interview, Yunus has since regarded the current state of SAARC as "disheartening" and "has regressed"

During a 14 December 2025 courtesy call at the State Guest House Jamuna by Thailand's newly appointed ambassador to Bangladesh, Thithiporn Chirasawadi, Yunus stated that the interim government is taking the ASEAN membership effort "very seriously", and expressed confidence that Thailand will back Bangladesh's membership bid, which has also included seeking Sectoral Dialogue Partner status. He had also recounts bilateral discussions on expanding trade and investment, improving maritime connectivity, preventing online scams, multilateral cooperation, people-to-people exchanges, alongside Thailand's interest in starting negotiations on a bilateral free trade agreement and plans for a direct shipping route between Ranong Port and Chittagong Port, expected to start in March after February talks between shipping authorities; Yunus also called for more visas for Bangladeshi travelers going to Thailand for medical treatment, business, education, and tourism.

==== 2026 ====
There were concerns that Bangladesh's ASEAN bid was heavily dependent on the personal diplomacy of Muhammad Yunus, raising questions about whether the initiative would endure beyond his tenure. However, in the change of government with the recent win of the Bangladesh National Party (BNP) under Tarique Rahman in the 2026 Bangladeshi general elections, the party's election manifesto stated an intention to join ASEAN as a way to widen Bangladesh's diplomatic options and "reduce over-dependence on any single power." More so, influenced by geopolitical uncertainty involving the United States and China, as well as hostility from neighbouring India. Leaving opportunity for Bangladesh to access more diversified supply chains and attract increased inward foreign direct investment. Though, Rahman's manifesto floated ASEAN membership as part of a broader Indo-Pacific pivot.

== Public opinion ==
A Centre for Alternatives' nationwide survey titled "National Image of China in Bangladesh" was released publicly in March 2025. The survey asked respondents to rate Bangladesh's evolving relations with several countries and regional bodies after the July uprising (with fieldwork reported as October–November 2024). With a sample size of 5,335 people, 52.22% rated relations with ASEAN as positive and 4.18% as negative; the remaining 43.60% were split between "mixed" and "don't know."

== Impact of joining ==
=== Benefits to Bangladesh ===
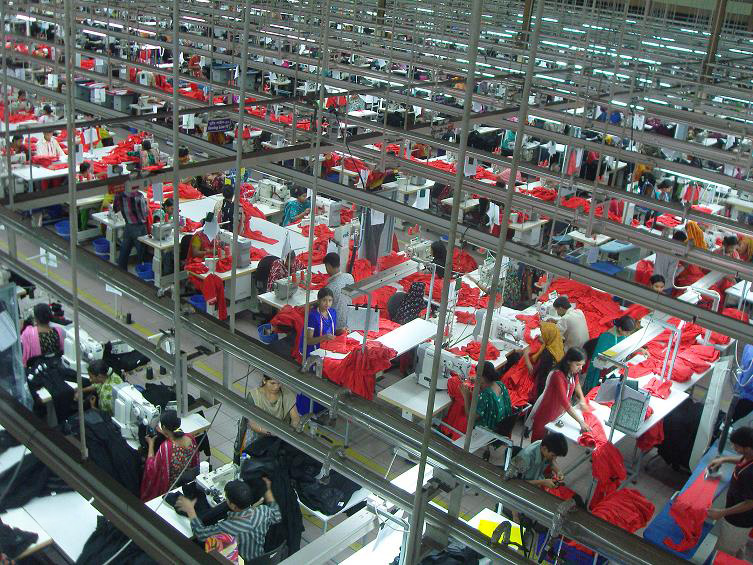
Garments account for over 85% of Bangladesh's exports. Joining ASEAN could serve as a means to diversify its economy and trade.

Bangladesh stands to gain significantly from ASEAN's integrated economy. Membership would provide duty‑free access to all ASEAN markets and allow participation in ASEAN-wide Free Trade Areas such as the Regional Comprehensive Economic Partnership (RCEP). The Bangladesh Trade and Tariff Commission projects that joining ASEAN's RCEP alone could raise Bangladesh's exports by ~17% and GDP by ~0.26%. Such integration would help offset expected export losses (7–14%) when Bangladesh graduates from least developed countries (LDC) status. ASEAN's 680+ million consumers would then become reachable under common trade rules. Bangladeshi exporters (beyond its garment‐focused trade) would gain duty-free access to a diversified market. Within the first ten years of joining the regional trade bloc would stipulate a reduction of tariffs on 90% of trade. Whist RCEP would enforce trade liberalisation, standardization, and quality control measures among wider Bangladeshi industries. Analysts note that being part of ASEAN (and RCEP) could boost investor confidence and significantly increase foreign direct investment (FDI) inflows into Bangladesh.

Bangladeshi officials are already seeking to attract more ASEAN investment in sectors like ICT and energy. Bangladesh could tap ASEAN experience in expanding renewables and LNG infrastructure connected via ASEAN's regional energy grid (ASEAN Power Grid). Recent deals (e.g., LNG imports from Brunei, joint ventures with Indonesia and Malaysia) show growing Bangladesh-ASEAN energy ties. ASEAN cooperation could help Bangladesh meet its renewable targets, improve energy efficiency, and finance projects (including carbon capture and storage, regas terminals).

Bangladesh's emerging industries (pharma, ICT, agriculture) could plug into ASEAN supply chains. Infrastructure projects like the Matarbari deep-sea port, the Asian Highway Network, and rail links would turn Bangladesh into a logistics hub linking South Asia to Southeast Asia. For example, bilateral and trilateral transport corridors (via India or Myanmar) could streamline trade with Vietnam, Thailand, and beyond. ASEAN membership would also encourage moving up the value chain. Currently, over 85% of Bangladesh's exports are garments to the West. Bangladesh's garment, textile, and leather sectors could complement ASEAN manufacturing, and its emerging electronics or ICT sectors could find new partners and investors in Southeast Asia. As part of ASEAN's collective bargaining, Bangladesh could negotiate trade deals more effectively than alone. It would also become part of ASEAN's trade forums (e.g., the ASEAN Free Trade Area and the East Asia Summit's economic track).

As an ASEAN member, Bangladesh could engage through ASEAN's multilateral venues (East Asia Summit, ASEAN+3, ARF) on a more equal footing. Membership provides a "balanced platform" to interact with extra‐regional powers (Japan, Korea, Australia, US) via ASEAN channels. This reduces over-reliance on any single partner. ASEAN itself has successfully maintained "centrality" amid U.S.–China rivalry. Bangladesh can tap into this diplomatic model. By aligning with ASEAN's consensual approach, Dhaka can preserve autonomy and leverage ASEAN as a buffer in great-power politics. By institutionalizing ties with ASEAN Dialogue Partners (e.g., the EU, India, and China) through ASEAN+ frameworks, Bangladesh could join ASEAN-hosted initiatives on education, science, and cultural exchange with these partners, enhancing its diplomatic reach.

=== Effect upon ASEAN ===
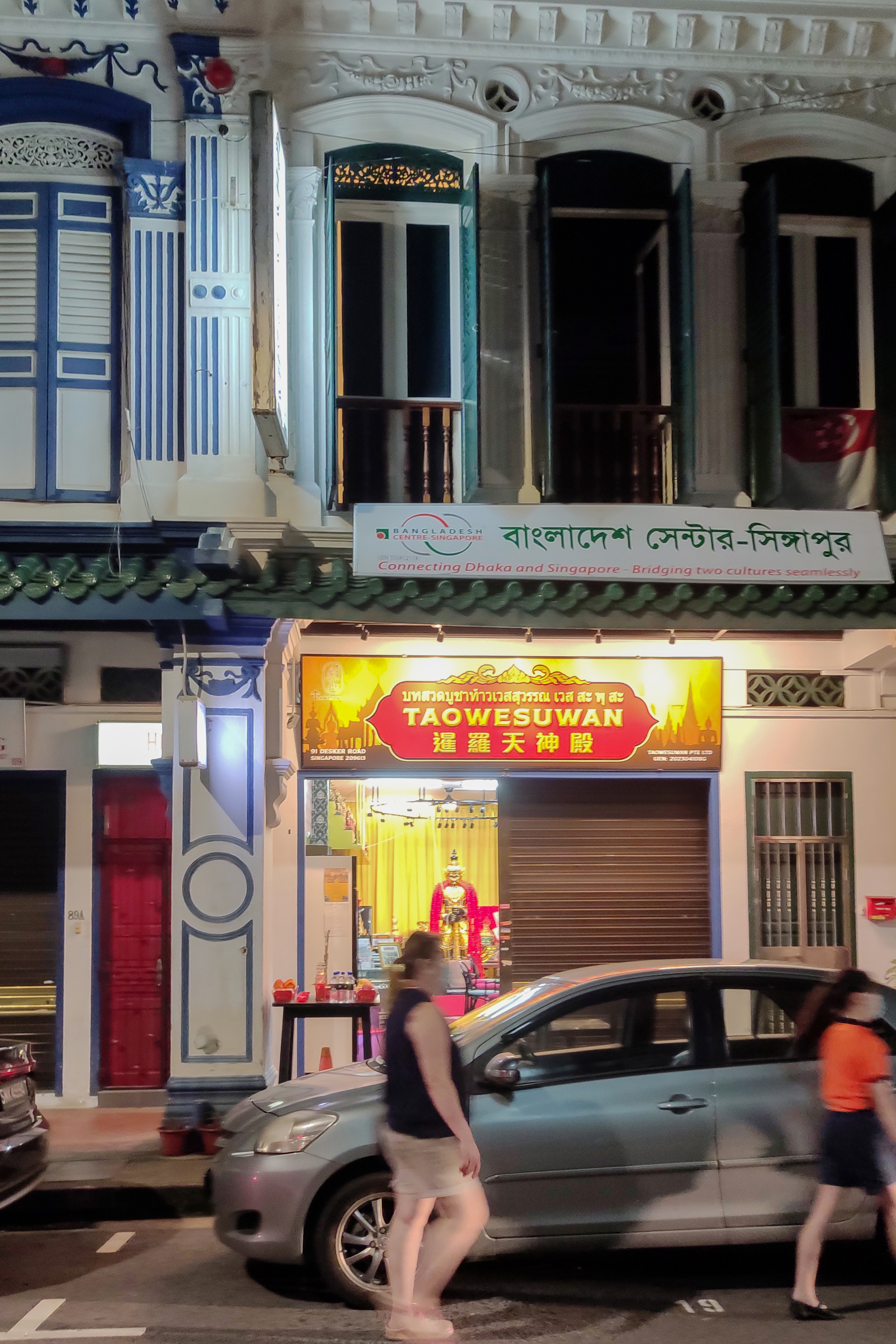
Bangladesh Centre, 91A Desker Road, Singapore. Bangladeshi diaspora accounts for more than 150,000 people in the state.

Integrating Bangladesh would substantially enlarge ASEAN's combined market size. ASEAN currently represents over 680 million people with a combined GDP of about $4.5 trillion. Bangladesh alone adds roughly 170 million people and is the world's 8th most populous country (with the 7th largest labor force) and about the 34th largest economy by GDP. This means ASEAN members would gain tariff-free access to a significant new consumer base and production hub. In effect, Bangladesh's growing middle class and demand would become an internal market for ASEAN exporters. Notably, Bangladesh already imports more from ASEAN countries than it exports to them; its accession (and the resulting zero-tariff regime) would likely boost ASEAN's export revenue in Bangladesh's market. Moreover, only 4–5% of Bangladesh's exports currently go to Asian economies (ASEAN, India, China), with an untapped trade potential that closer integration could unlock. Increased two-way trade would benefit ASEAN producers and consumers through a greater variety of goods and potentially lower prices. Quantitative analysis suggests that deeper South Asia–Southeast Asia integration would modestly lift ASEAN's overall economic output. A World Bank study finds that a comprehensive reduction of tariffs and non-tariff barriers between the regions could boost Southeast Asia's GDP by up to 1.4% and exports by 4.1% in the long run. Additionally, as Bangladesh graduates from LDC status by 2026 (losing some tariff preferences in Western markets), its pivot to ASEAN can diversify its trade partners.

Geographically, Bangladesh sits at the crossroads of South and Southeast Asia, sharing a border with Myanmar and a coastline on the Bay of Bengal. ASEAN's footprint would extend to the doorstep of India and other South Asian markets, effectively making Bangladesh a bridge linking the two regions. Crucial trans-regional infrastructure projects reap this benefit. For instance, the planned Trans-Asian Railway and Asian Highway networks are envisioned to link Southeast Asia through Myanmar into Bangladesh (and onwards to India and China's Yunnan). Integrating Bangladesh into ASEAN would likely accelerate such projects, creating overland corridors that complement existing sea routes. The development of Bangladesh's deep-sea port at Matarbari and the expansion of Chattogram Port are poised to make Bangladesh into a logistics and transshipment hub for ASEAN countries, improving access to the Bay of Bengal. The Asian Development Bank (ADB) is already investing in a SASEC–Myanmar corridor connecting Bangladesh with Myanmar; once completed, this corridor "will promote South Asia–Southeast Asia connectivity" and facilitate smoother cross-border transport and customs links.

== See also ==
- History of ASEAN
- Enlargement of ASEAN
  - Accession of Papua New Guinea to ASEAN
  - Accession of Sri Lanka to ASEAN
  - Accession of Timor-Leste to ASEAN (fulfilled)
- Western Southeast Asia
- Bangladesh and the Indo-Pacific Strategy
