= List of ambassadors of Bangladesh to Saudi Arabia =

Ambassador of Bangladesh to the Kingdom of Saudi Arabia
- সৌদি আরবে নিযুক্ত বাংলাদেশের রাষ্ট্রদূত
- National emblem of Bangladesh

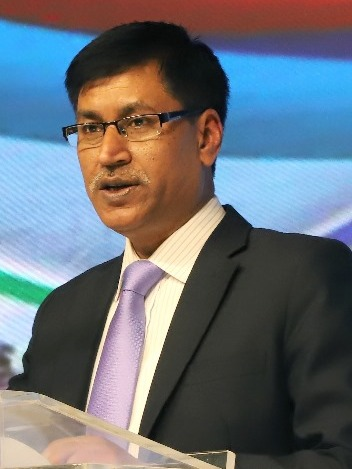
- Incumbent; Md. Delwar Hossain since December 24, 2024
- Ministry of Foreign Affairs
- Style: The Honourable (formal); Mr. Ambassador (informal); His Excellency (diplomatic)
- Reports to: Prime Minister; Minister of Foreign Affairs
- Residence: Riyadh, Saudi Arabia
- Seat: Dareen St, Riyadh, Saudi Arabia
- Nominator: The government of Bangladesh
- Appointer: The president of Bangladesh; on the advice of the; prime minister
- Term length: Prime Minister’s pleasure
- Inaugural holder: Humayun Rashid Choudhury
- Formation: 10 June 1976; 50 years ago
- Salary: ৳300000 (US$2,400) per month (incl. allowances)
- Website: Embassy of Bangladesh, Riyadh

The Bangladeshi ambassador to the Saudi Arabia is the official representative of the Government of Bangladesh to the Government of the Saudi Arabia.

== List of ambassadors ==
A partial list is available on the website of the Embassy of Bangladesh in Riyadh.

- Md. Delwar Hossain (26 December 2024 - Present)
- Mohammad Javed Patwary (22 August 2020 – 15 August 2024)
- Golam Moshi (24 February 2015 – 31 July 2020)
- Mohammed Shahidul Islam (27 December 2010 – 3 February 2015)
- M. Fazlul Karim (5 August 2008 - 8 December 2010)
- S. M. Ikramul Haque (8 November 2004 - 19 July 2008)
- S. K. Sharjil Hassan (28 July 2002 - 18 October 2004)
- Mahboob Alam (17 April 2000 - 4 June 2002)
- Abdul Momen Choudhury (23 January 1997 – 7 February 2000)
- Quazi Golam Dastgir (2 February 1988 – 31 December 1991)
- Hedayet Ahmed (1 August 1985 – 30 January 1988)
- Mohammad Mohsin (1981 – 1985)
- Humayun Rashid Choudhury (10 June 1976 – 17 October 1981), first ambassador of Bangladesh to the Kingdom of Saudi Arabia.

== See also ==
- Ambassadors of Bangladesh
