= Bangladesh–Indonesia relations =

- Bangladesh: Indonesia

Diplomatic mission
- Embassy of Bangladesh, Jakarta: Embassy of Indonesia, Dhaka

Bangladesh and Indonesia established diplomatic relations on 1 May 1972. Indonesia is the world's largest Muslim country, whereas Bangladesh is the world's fourth largest Muslim country. They are partners in the United Nations and various multilateral organisations, particularly in international peacekeeping, the Developing 8 Countries, the Non-Aligned Movement, the World Trade Organization and the Organisation of Islamic Cooperation. Bangladesh has an embassy in Jakarta, and Indonesia has one in Dhaka. Official diplomatic relations were established in 1972 after Indonesia became one of the first Muslim countries to recognise independent Bangladesh.

== History ==
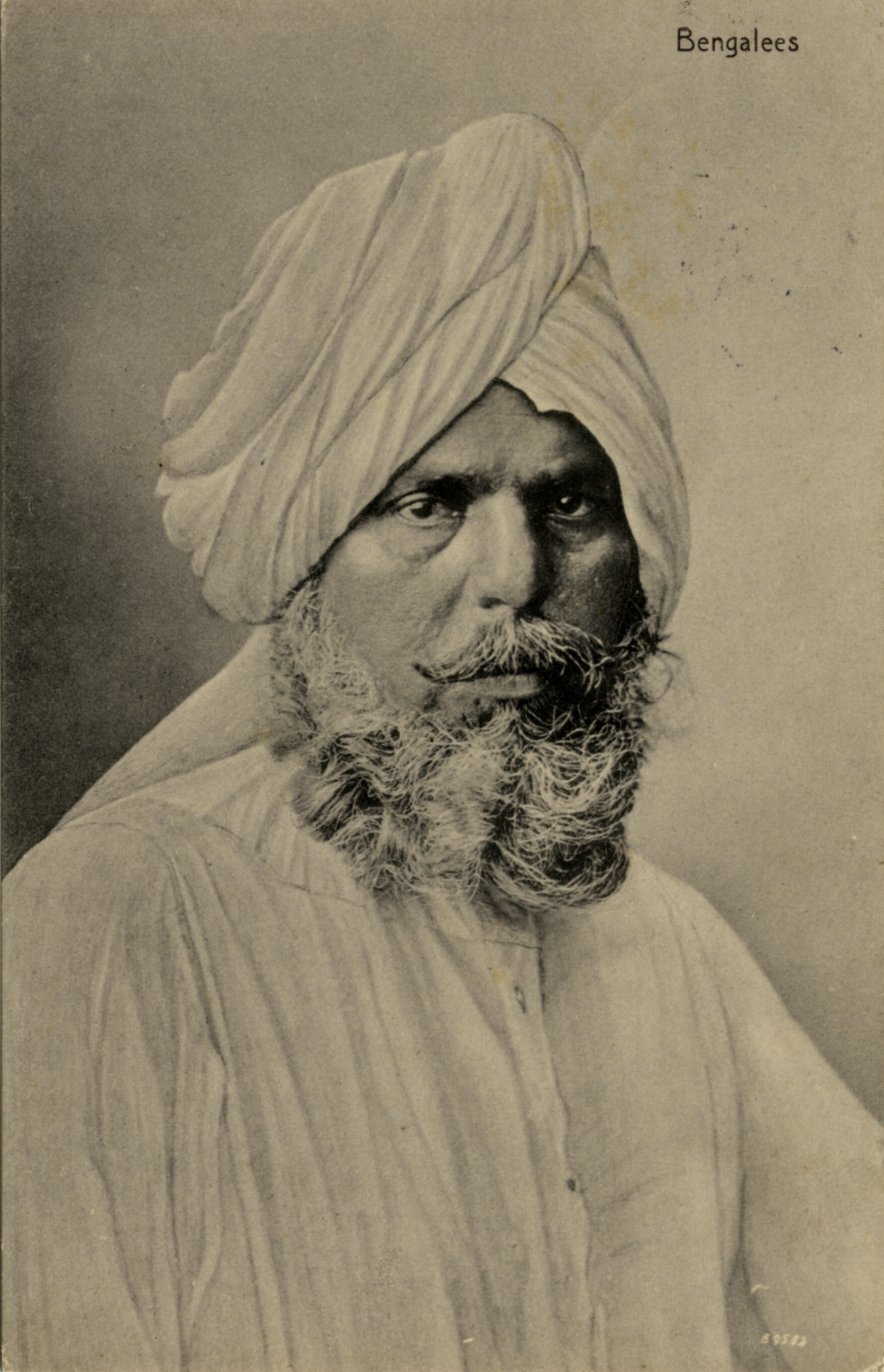
Early 20th-century image of a Bengali man in Medan, Sumatra.

Contacts between the Bay of Bengal region and the Indonesian archipelago commenced centuries ago. Indonesia and Bangladesh were connected to the maritime Silk Road of the Indian Ocean trade network, where goods traveled and ideas were exchanged. Since the early 4th century, Indonesia has received Hindu, and subsequently Buddhist influences from South Asia. In the 9th century, the Srivijaya empire established contacts through religious and education relations with Buddhist schools, monasteries and universities in ancient India and Bangladesh, such as Nalanda and Somapura. According to I-ching (635–713 CE), a Chinese Buddhist monk who wrote about his journey to Nalanda, Srivijayan royal ships had a regular schedule to the Bay of Bengal. Maritime links existed between the medieval Bengal Sultanate and kingdoms in the Indonesian archipelago, particularly the Sultanates of Sumatra, which lay to the southeast of the Bay of Bengal. In old Indonesian accounts, Bay of Bengal was called Teluk Benggala ("Bay of Benggala").

After the separation of Bangladesh from Pakistan, despite initially supporting Pakistan's position in the war, Indonesia, along with other non-Arab Muslim countries such as Malaysia, Turkey and Afghanistan immediately recognised Bangladesh's sovereignty in 1971. Soon after its independence in 1971, Bangladesh established diplomatic relations with Indonesia, and the embassy started functioning from May 1972.

== Cooperations ==
Both nations welcome initiatives in furthering the bilateral co-operation in various areas, including trade and investment, agriculture, defence, education, food security, good governance, counter-terrorism, research and technology as well as disaster mitigation and management. Besides bilateral co-operation, both nations exchanged their views on the two countries' co-operation in regional and global fora. As Muslim majority countries, both nations also exchanged views and voiced their concern on addressing the Rohingya Muslim refugees issue in neighbouring Myanmar.

At the end of October, both Bangladesh and Indonesia saw strikes involving millions of low-wage workers demanding substantial increases in their minimum wages. Semen Indonesia, the country's largest cement maker, is mulling over plans to expand its business to Bangladesh in efforts to capitalize on Bangladesh's rising consumer demand. Bangladesh, Indonesia and Iran were rated as the nations most at risk from extreme weather and geophysical events, according to a 2010 study. Global risks advisory firm Maplecroft had developed the Natural Disasters Risk Index (NDRI) to enable businesses and insurance companies to identify risks to international assets.

== Trade ==
Indonesia has recently signed a deal with a Bangladeshi pharmaceutical company to export its goods to their country, where Bangladesh sees another potential market for its pharmaceutical products. Trade between the two countries amounted to US$1.53 billion in 2017.

== Diplomacy ==
=== Ambassadors of Bangladesh to Indonesia ===
- Khurram Khan Panni (1972–1975)
- A. H. S. Ataul Karim (1976–1979)
- Shamsul Islam (1979–1982)
- Moinul Hossain Chowdhury (1982–1986)
- Manzur Murshed (1986–1991)
- A. K. M. Farooq (1991–1995)
- Abdul Momen Chowdhury (1995–1996)
- Zia-us-Shams Chowdhury (1997–1998)
- M Afsarul Qader (1998–2002)
- Nasim Ferdous (2002–2006)
- Salma Khan (2006–2008)
- Syed Fahim Munaim (2008)
- Golam Mohammad (2010–2013)
- Md. Nazmul Quaunine (2013–2016)
- Azmal Kabir (2016–2020)
- Air Vice Marshal Mohammad Mostafizur Rahman (2020–present)
