= M. Fazlul Karim =

Bangladeshi political adviser

- এম. ফজলুল করিম

Ambassador of Bangladesh to China
- In office October 2014 – 21 August 2019
- Succeeded by: Mahbub Uz Zaman

Ambassador of Bangladesh to Mexico
- In office May 2013 – October 2014
- Succeeded by: Supradip Chakma

Ambassador of Bangladesh to Jordan
- In office 2011 – May 2013
- Succeeded by: Muhammad Enayet Hussain

Ambassador of Bangladesh to Saudi Arabia
- In office 1 May 2008 – December 2010
- Preceded by: S. M. Ikramul Haque
- Succeeded by: Mohammed Shahidul Islam

Ambassador of Bangladesh to Italy
- In office 13 January 2006 – 28 July 2008
- Preceded by: Anwarul Bar Chowdhury
- Succeeded by: Masud Bin Momen

Personal details
- Education: University of Dhaka

M. Fazlul Karim is a Bangladeshi diplomat and a former Ambassador of Bangladesh to Saudi Arabia, Mexico, Jordan, China and Italy.

== Early life ==
Karim did his bachelors and master's in international relations at the University of Dhaka.

== Career ==
Karim joined the foreign service branch of the Bangladesh Civil Service in 1984 or 1986.

Karim was the director of the Ministry of Foreign Affairs. He was a counsellor at the Bangladesh embassy in the United States. He was a Deputy High Commissioner at the Bangladesh High Commission in Pakistan. He was the Consul General of Bangladesh in Hong Kong. He was the Director General of the South Asia wing, the SAARC wing, and the United Nations wing in the Ministry of Foreign Affairs. He was appointed the ambassador of Bangladesh to Italy on 13 January 2006, replacing Anwarul Bar Chowdhury. He served till 28 July 2008. Masud Bin Momen succeeded him.

On 1 May 2008, Karim was appointed as an ambassador of Bangladesh to Saudi Arabia replacing S. M. Ikramul Haque. In December 2010, he was replaced by Mohammed Shahidul Islam.

Karim then served as an ambassador to Jordan. He went on to serve as the ambassador to Mexico in May 2013.

In October 2014, he was appointed as the ambassador of Bangladesh to China. He received a delegation from the Asia-Pacific Space Cooperation Organization at the embassy.
