= Amir Hussain Sikder =

- আমির হুসেইন শিকদার
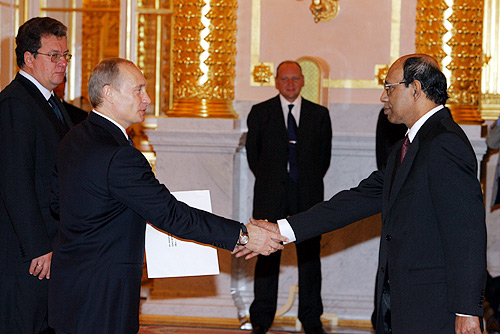
- Sikder with President Vladimir Putin (2005)

Ambassador of Bangladesh to Russia
- In office 5 June 2005 – 9 July 2007
- Preceded by: A. T. M. Nazimullah Chowdhury
- Succeeded by: Mohamed Mijarul Quayes

High Commissioner of Bangladesh to South Africa
- In office August 2002 – 2005
- Succeeded by: Nasima Haider

Personal details
- Education: University of Dhaka (M.Com)
- Occupation: Diplomat

Amir Hussain Sikder is a Bangladeshi diplomat and former Ambassador of Bangladesh to Russia and Ukraine. He was accredited as the Ambassador of Bangladesh to Belarus. He is the former High Commissioner of Bangladesh to South Africa.

== Early life ==
Sikder completed his bachelor's and master's degrees in Commerce at the University of Dhaka.

== Career ==
Sikder joined the 1979 batch of the Bangladesh Civil Service. He served in Bangladeshi embassies in Thailand, India, Pakistan, and the Philippines. He was the first secretary at the Bangladesh's Embassy in Pakistan.

In August 2002, Sikder was appointed High Commissioner of Bangladesh to South Africa. He was concurrently accredited as the High Commissioner of Bangladesh to Namibia. In 2005, Nasima Haider replaced him as the High Commissioner of Bangladesh to South Africa.

Sikder was appointed Ambassador of Bangladesh to Russia on 24 April 2005, replacing A. T. M. Nazimullah Chowdhury. He was concurrently accredited to Belarus, Lithuania, and Ukraine. He presented his accreditations in September to President Vladimir Putin. In May 2007, he signed a trade agreement with the government of Belarus. He signed an Agreement on Trade and Economic Cooperation with Oleg Alekseevich Demin, Ukraine's Ambassador to Russia. On 3 August 2008, Mohamed Mijarul Quayes replaced Sikder as the Ambassador of Bangladesh to Russia.

Sikder is a member of the Association of Former BCS(FA) Ambassadors.
