= Md Abdul Hannan =

Md Abdul Hannan is a retired diplomat and the former permanent representative of Bangladesh to the United Nations Office in Geneva. He is the former High Commissioner of Bangladesh to the United Kingdom. He was the ambassador of Bangladesh to Oman.

== Early life ==
Hannan did his bachelor's degree and masters in economics at the University of Chittagong. He completed a second masters at the Lancaster University in diplomacy in 1989.

== Career ==
Hannan joined the 1984 batch of Bangladesh Civil Service and was placed in the foreign service in 1986.

Hannan served in the Embassy of Bangladesh in Oman, Embassy of Bangladesh in Russia, Deputy High Commission of Bangladesh in Kolkata, High Commission of Bangladesh in United Kingdom, and the High Commission of Bangladesh in Pakistan.

Hannan served as the Deputy High Commissioner of Bangladesh in Pakistan from 2004 to 2006. He was the vice-principal of the Bangladesh Foreign Service Academy. In September 2006, he was appointed the ambassador of Bangladesh to Oman.

In June 2009, Hannan was appointed Permanent Representative of Bangladesh to the United Nations Office in Geneva. He represented Bangladesh at a meeting of the International Labour Organization concerning compensation to worker harmed in 2012 Dhaka garment factory fire and Rana Plaza collapse.

Hannan was appointed ambassador of Bangladesh to Switzerland in June 2010. In February 2015, Hannan was appointed High Commissioner of Bangladesh to the United Kingdom replacing Mohamed Mijarul Quayes. Quayes was appointed ambassador of Bangladesh to Brazil where he replaced M Shameem Ahsan who was transferred as ambassador to Geneva replacing Hannan. Ismat Jahan replaced Hannan as the High Commissioner of Bangladesh to the United Kingdom.

== Personal life ==
Hannan is married and has two sons.
