= Md. Delwar Hossain (ambassador) =

Bangladeshi diplomat

Delwar Hossain
- মোঃ দেলওয়ার হোসেন
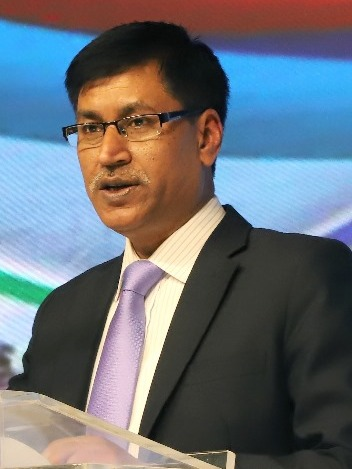
- Hossain in Seoul (2024)

Ambassador of Bangladesh to Kingdom of Saudi Arabia
- Incumbent
- Assumed office 25 December 2024
- President: Mohammed Shahabuddin; Hafiz Uddin Ahmad (acting); Mirza Fakhrul Islam Alamgir
- Prime Minister: Muhammad Yunus (as Chief Adviser); Tarique Rahman
- Preceded by: Mohammad Javed Patwary

Ambassador of Bangladesh to South Korea
- In office 1 October 2021 – 18 December 2024
- President: Mohammad Abdul Hamid; Mohammed Shahabuddin
- Prime Minister: Sheikh Hasina; Muhammad Yunus (as Chief Adviser)
- Preceded by: Abida Islam
- Succeeded by: Toufiq Islam Shatil

Personal details
- Education: Khulna University of Engineering and Technology; University of Dhaka; École nationale d'administration

Delwar Hossain is a Bangladeshi career diplomat currently serving as the Ambassador of Bangladesh to the Kingdom of Saudi Arabia. He was the ambassador of Bangladesh to South Korea.

== Early life and education ==
Hossain graduated in Mechanical Engineering from the Khulna University of Engineering and Technology. He later obtained a Master of Business Administration from the Institute of Business Administration, University of Dhaka. He also completed a diploma in International Relations from the International Institute of Public Administration in Paris.

== Career ==
Hossain joined the Bangladesh Foreign Service in 1998 through the 17th batch of the Bangladesh Civil Service. He served as an assistant secretary at the Ministry of Foreign Affairs from 1998 to 2001. He began his overseas assignments at the Embassy of Bangladesh in Paris, where he served as Third Secretary and then Second Secretary from 2001 to 2004. He was posted to the Embassy in Tripoli as First Secretary and Counsellor from 2004 to 2008. He then served as Counsellor at the Embassy in Thimphu from 2012 to 2014, followed by his role as Minister and Deputy Head of Mission at the Embassy in Beijing from 2014 to 2017.

Hossain was the director general of Myanmar Wing at the Ministry of Foreign Affairs from 2017 to 2021. In 2021, He was appointed Bangladesh's Ambassador to the Republic of Korea. He replaced Abida Islam, who was appointed ambassador of Bangladesh to Mexico. On 25 December 2024, he was appointed the Ambassador of Bangladesh to the Kingdom of Saudi Arabia. In April 2025, he welcomed the Bangladeshi Hajj pilgrims at the King Abdulaziz International Airport in Jeddah.

== Personal life ==
Hossain is married and has two sons. He is proficient in English and French.
