= M Shameem Ahsan =

Bangladeshi diplomat

- এম শামীম আহসান
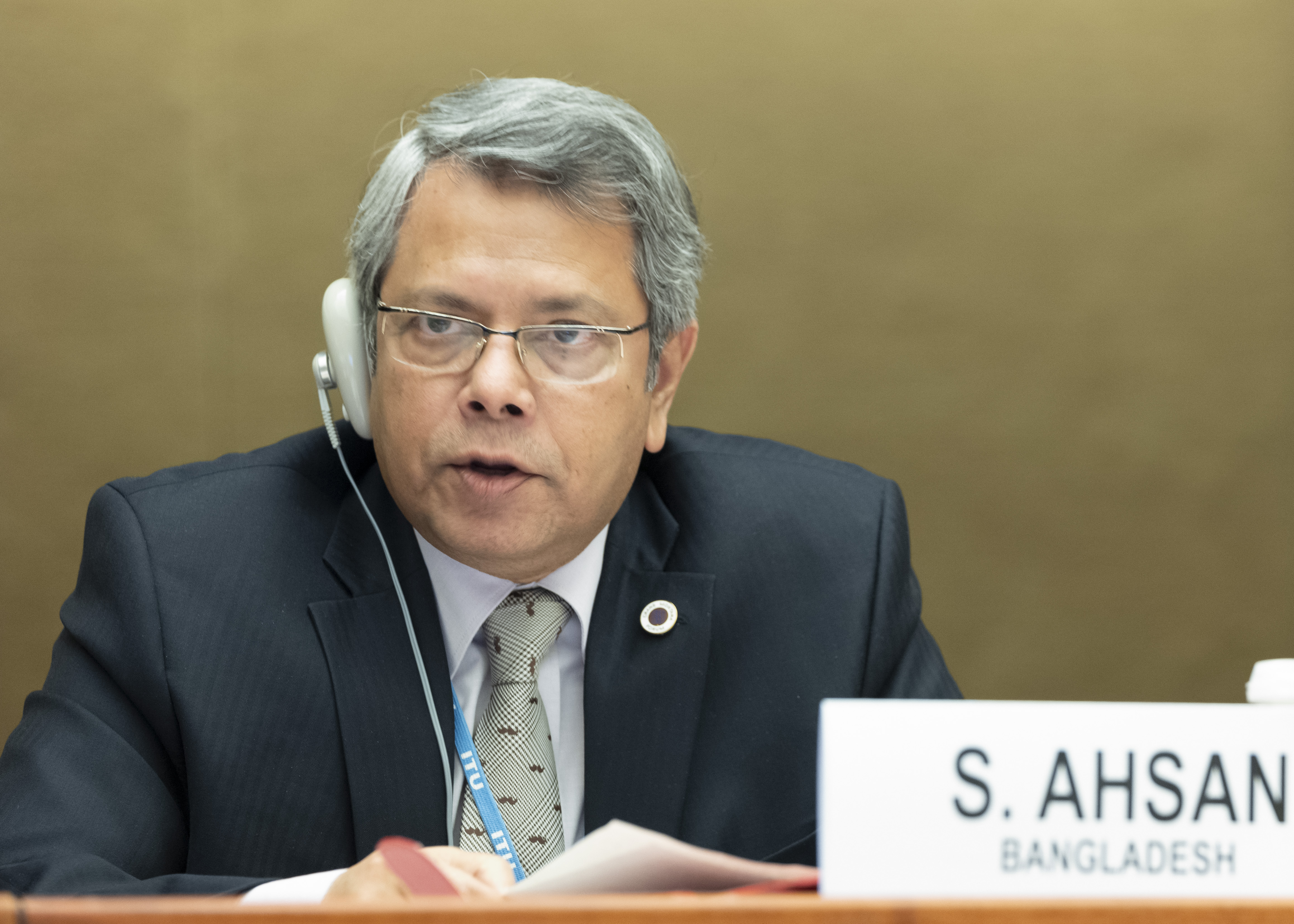
- Ahsan in 2019

Ambassador of Bangladesh to Brazil
- In office 28 September 2012 – 22 September 2014
- Preceded by: Position created
- Succeeded by: Mohamed Mijarul Quayes

High Commissioner of Bangladesh to Brunei
- In office 1 January 2009 – 20 September 2012
- Preceded by: Mohammed Abdul Hye
- Succeeded by: Md. Hedayetul Islam Chowdhury

Ambassador of Bangladesh to Iran

Personal details
- Spouse: Momtaz Ahsan
- Education: Rajshahi Medical College

M Shameem Ahsan is a retired Bangladeshi diplomat and former permanent representative of Bangladesh to the United Nations Office in Geneva. He is a former ambassador of Bangladesh to Brazil.

== Early life ==
In 1976, Ahsan graduated from Jhenaidah Cadet College. He graduated from Rajshahi Medical College with an MBBS.

== Career ==
Ahsan joined the Bangladesh Civil Service in 1984 as a foreign service cadre.

In November 2008, Ahsan, then ambassador of Bangladesh to Iran, was appointed the high commissioner of Bangladesh to Brunei Darussalam. On 31 July 2012, Ahsan was appointed the ambassador of Bangladesh to Brazil.

In July 2014, Ahsan was appointed the permanent representative of Bangladesh to the United Nations Office in Geneva and Vienna. He replaced Md. Abdul Hannan. Mohamed Mijarul Quayes was appointed ambassador of Bangladesh to Brazil to replace Ahsan.

== Personal life ==
Ahsan is married to Momtaz Ahsan.
