= A. T. M. Nazimullah Chowdhury =

Bangladeshi diplomat

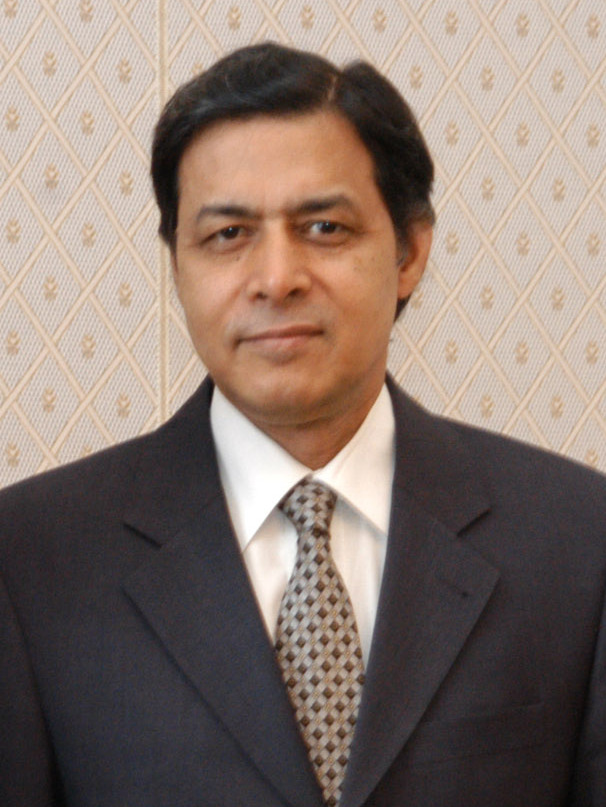
- Chowdhury in Kazan (2003)

Ambassador of Bangladesh to United Arab Emirates
- In office 20 February 2006 – March 2008
- Succeeded by: Md. Nazmul Quaunine

Ambassador of Bangladesh to Russia
- In office 9 August 2002 – 6 February 2005
- Preceded by: S. K. Sharjil Hassan
- Succeeded by: Amir Hussein Sikder

Ambassador of Bangladesh to Turkey
- In office 25 November 1998 – 3 August 2002
- Preceded by: Mahboob Alam
- Succeeded by: ATM Nazrul Islam

A. T. M. Nazimullah Chowdhury is a retired Bangladeshi diplomat and a former ambassador of Bangladesh to Russia, United Arab Emirates and Turkey.

== Career ==
Chowdhury joined the Civil Service of Bangladesh on 21 December 1974. He was the second secretary at the Permanent Mission of Bangladesh to the United Nations in Geneva. He served in the Permanent Mission of Bangladesh to the United Nations. He was a consul at the Bangladeshi embassy in Rome in the 1980s.

On 9 August 2002, Chowdhury was appointed Ambassador of Bangladesh to Russia, replacing S. K. Sharjil Hassan. He served as the Ambassador of Bangladesh to Russia till 6 February 2005 before being replaced by Amir Hussein Sikder.

The Bangladesh Nationalist Party government appointed Chowdhury as the Ambassador of Bangladesh to the United Arab Emirates in February 2006.

Chowdhury was suspended as Bangladesh's envoy to the United Arab Emirates. M Nazmul Quaunine replaced him as the Ambassador of Bangladesh to the United Arab Emirates in June 2008. He was sentenced to five years' imprisonment by a special court on 16 November 2008 in a corruption case filed by the Anti-Corruption Commission. The case, filed in May 2008, alleged he had embezzled funds from the state for personal purchases. His defence lawyers, Barrister Ahsanul Karim and Advocate Mohammad Zakaria, alleged the verdict violated a High Court Division stay order issued on November 12 halting proceedings for six months. They plan to file a contempt of court petition against the judge and prosecutor for disregarding the High Court directive.

In April 2010, the Appellate Division directed Chowdhury to surrender before the trial court by 25 April in the corruption case. The court declared that as a fugitive, Nazimullah is not entitled to any legal relief until he surrenders. The case, filed in 2008, alleges he caused a loss of BDT 2.1 million to the state through "abuse of power and deception". In August 2013, the High Court Division sentenced him to three years imprisonment in the case while rejecting his appeal.
