= Anwarul Bar Chowdhury =

Bangladeshi diplomat (born 1946)

Ambassador of Bangladesh to Italy
- In office 24 October 2003 – 14 October 2005
- Preceded by: Mohammad Ziauddin
- Succeeded by: M. Fazlul Karim

Personal details
- Born: 1946 (age 79–80)
- Education: University of Dhaka; University of California, Berkeley
- Occupation: Diplomat, educator

Anwarul Bar Chowdhury (born 1946) is a retired Bangladeshi diplomat and government official. He is an Independent Director of GSP Finance Company (Bangladesh) Limited. He is a former secretary of the Ministry of Establishment.

== Early life ==
Chowdhury was born in 1946. He earned a Master's degree in Economics from the University of Dhaka. He also completed a second Master’s degree from the University of California, Berkeley in the United States.

== Career ==
Chowdhury held key government positions. He served as Vice Chairman of the Export Promotion Bureau, Secretary of the Ministry of Establishment and the Ministry of Planning, and as a Member of the Planning Commission. He was also a member of Rajdhani Unnayan Kartripakkha.

From 1989 to 1993, Chowdhury was posted as Counsellor at the Embassy of Bangladesh in Warsaw, Poland. Before his retirement, he served as Bangladesh’s Ambassador to Italy, with concurrent accreditation to Greece, Albania, and Serbia. He was appointed ambassador in October 2003, replacing Mohammad Ziauddin. He was also the Permanent Representative of Bangladesh to the United Nations Agencies in Rome and the ambassador of Bangladesh to the Vatican. He served till October 2005 and was replaced by M. Fazlul Karim.

After retirement, Chowdhury worked as a Senior Consultant for the Bangladesh Enterprise Institute on a Private Sector Development Project supported by the IFC and the World Bank. Chowdhury also taught at several well-known colleges and universities in Bangladesh during his professional career. He is the chairman of the audit committee and an Independent Director of GSP Finance Company (Bangladesh) Limited.
