= Mohammed Abdul Hye =

Bangladeshi diplomat

- মোহাম্মদ আব্দুল হাই

Ambassador of Bangladesh to Thailand
- In office 31 December 2020 – 21 June 2024
- Preceded by: Md. Nazmul Quaunine
- Succeeded by: Faiyaz Murshid Kazi

Ambassador of Bangladesh to Algeria
- In office 2016–2020
- Succeeded by: Muhammad Zulqar Nain

High Commissioner of Bangladesh to Brunei
- In office 28 September 2012 – 21 October 2016
- Preceded by: M Shameem Ahsan
- Succeeded by: Mahmud Hussain

Personal details
- Born: 29 December 1964 (age 61) Dhaka, East Pakistan, Pakistan
- Education: Bangladesh University of Engineering and Technology

Mohammed Abdul Hye (born 29 December 1964) is a Bangladeshi diplomat. He is a former ambassador of Bangladesh to Thailand (2020–2024), Algeria (2016–2020), and Brunei (2012–2016).

== Background ==
Mohammed Abdul Hye was born on 29 December 1964 in Dhaka in the then East Pakistan. He earned a bachelor's degree in civil engineering from Bangladesh University of Engineering and Technology in April 1987.

== Career ==
As the ambassador of Thailand, Hye was accredited to Cambodia also.
