= Ataur Rahman Khan Kaiser =

Bangladeshi diplomat and politician

Ambassador of Bangladesh to Russia
- In office 18 July 1999 – 17 January 2001
- Preceded by: Mostafa Faruk Mohammad
- Succeeded by: S. K. Sharjil Hassan

Ambassador of Bangladesh to South Korea
- In office 18 December 1997 – 17 July 1999
- Preceded by: A.K. Md Fazlur Rahman
- Succeeded by: Iftikharul Karim

Personal details
- Born: 7 September 1940
- Died: 9 October 2010 (aged 70) Chittagong, Bangladesh
- Political party: Bangladesh Awami League
- Parent: Yar Ali Khan (father)

Ataur Rahman Khan Kaiser (7 September 1940 – 9 October 2010) was a Bangladesh Awami League politician and member of the National Assembly of Pakistan.

== Early life ==
Kaiser completed his master's in political science from the University of Dhaka.

== Career ==
Kaiser joined Awami League in 1969 after being inspired by Awami League politician M. A. Aziz. After the independence of Bangladesh, he was elected general secretary of the South Chittagong chapter of the Awami League. He was made Bangladesh's ambassador to Russia and South Korea. He was a presidium member of the Bangladesh Awami League.

== Death ==
Kaiser was injured in a road accident while on his way to the funeral of Osman Sarwar Alam Chowdhury on 28 August 2010. He received treatment at Apollo Hospital Dhaka and later was sent to Singapore. He was brought back to Bangladesh and admitted to Chittagong Medical College Hospital. He died on 9 October 2010 in Chittagong Medical College Hospital, Bangladesh.
