= Toufiq Islam Shatil =

Bangladeshi diplomat (born 1974)

- তৌফিক ইসলাম শাতিল
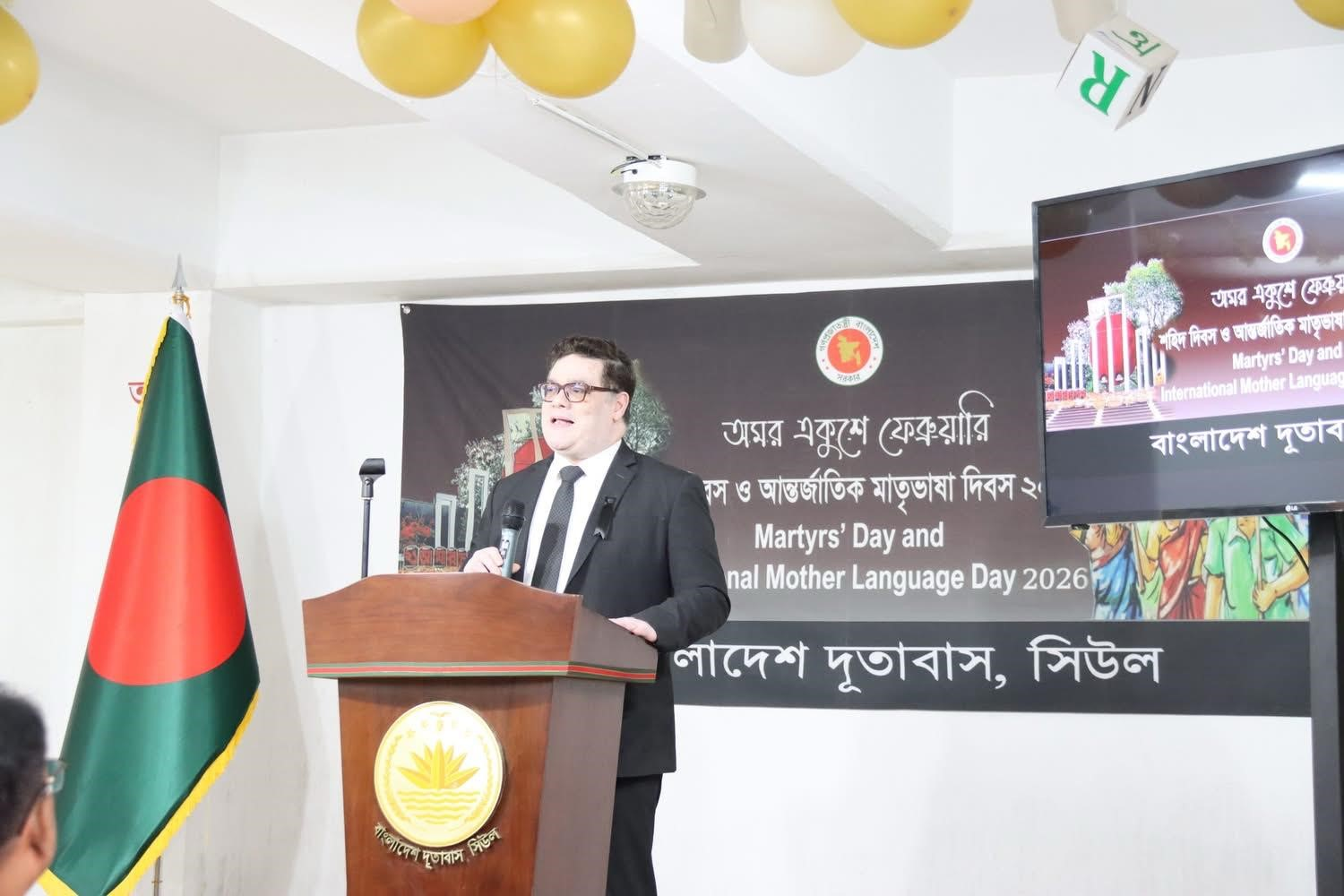
- Ambassador Toufiq Islam Shatil speaking during International Mother Language Day programme in Bangladesh Embassy, Seoul on 21 February 2026

Ambassador of Bangladesh to South Korea
- Incumbent
- Assumed office 28 February 2025
- Preceded by: Md. Delwar Hossain

Personal details
- Born: 8 March 1974 (age 52) Dhaka, Bangladesh
- Education: Bangladesh University of Engineering and Technology; École nationale d'administration

Toufiq Islam Shatil (born 8 March 1974) is a Bangladeshi diplomat and the current Ambassador of Bangladesh to South Korea.
