= Yar Ali Khan =

Yar Ali Khan was a member of the 4th National Assembly of Pakistan as a representative of East Pakistan.

== Biography ==
Khan was born at Tailardwip in what is now Anowara Upazila of Chittagong District.

He joined the All India Muslim League in 1937 and was elected to the Bengal Legislative Council in 1946. He joined the Pakistan National Guard in 1948 with the rank of captain.

In 1963, he received the President’s Medal for pride of performance in farming. That same year, the Sitara-e-Khidmat civil award was conferred on him in recognition of his services to the nation.

Khan was a member of the 4th National Assembly of Pakistan representing Chittagong-IV.

In March 1969, he renounced his Sitara-e-Khidmat award in protest against the government's repressive measures against its people, especially students. His son, Ataur Rahman Khan Kaiser, was elected to the National Assembly of Pakistan for Chittagong-VII in 1970 as an Awami League candidate.

Rajakhali Yar Ali Khan Ideal High School, established in 1966, was named after him in Cox's Bazar District, Chittagong Division.
