= S. K. Sharjil Hassan =

- এস. কে. শারজিল হাসান

Ambassador of Bangladesh to Saudi Arabia
- In office 28 July 2002 – October 2004
- Preceded by: Mahboob Alam
- Succeeded by: S. M. Ikramul Haque

Ambassador of Bangladesh to Russia
- In office 24 April 2001 – 20 July 2002
- Preceded by: Ataur Rahman Khan Kaiser
- Succeeded by: A. T. M. Nazimullah Chowdhury

S. K. Sharjil Hassan is a retired Bangladeshi diplomat and former ambassador of Bangladesh to Saudi Arabia (2002–2004) and Russia (2001–2002). He was the Consul General of Bangladesh in Los Angeles.

== Career ==
Hassan was the Director General of SAARC wing at the Ministry of Foreign Affairs in the 1980s.

Hassan was the first Consul General of Bangladesh in Los Angeles, serving from 10 October 1994 to 26 February 1996. Mohammad-al-Haroon succeeded him as the Consul General of Bangladesh. He then served as Bangladesh's ambassador to Azerbaijan. He signed an agreement on cooperation between the Television and Radio Company of Uzbekistan and the National Broadcasting Authority of Bangladesh.

On 24 April 2001, Hassan was appointed Ambassador of Bangladesh to Russia, replacing Ataur Rahman Khan Kaiser. He served as the ambassador in Moscow till 20 July 2002 and was replaced by A. T. M. Nazimullah Chowdhury. He was concurrently accredited to Lithuania.

Hassan was appointed Ambassador of Bangladesh to Saudi Arabia on 28 July 2002, replacing Mahboob Alam. He oversaw the arrival of the first Bangladeshi maids as workers in Saudi Arabia. In October 2004, S. M. Ikramul Haque succeeded Hassan as the Ambassador of Bangladesh to Saudi Arabia. It was Hassan's last overseas appointment in 36 years of serving as a diplomat of Bangladesh.
