= Bangladesh–Cambodia relations =

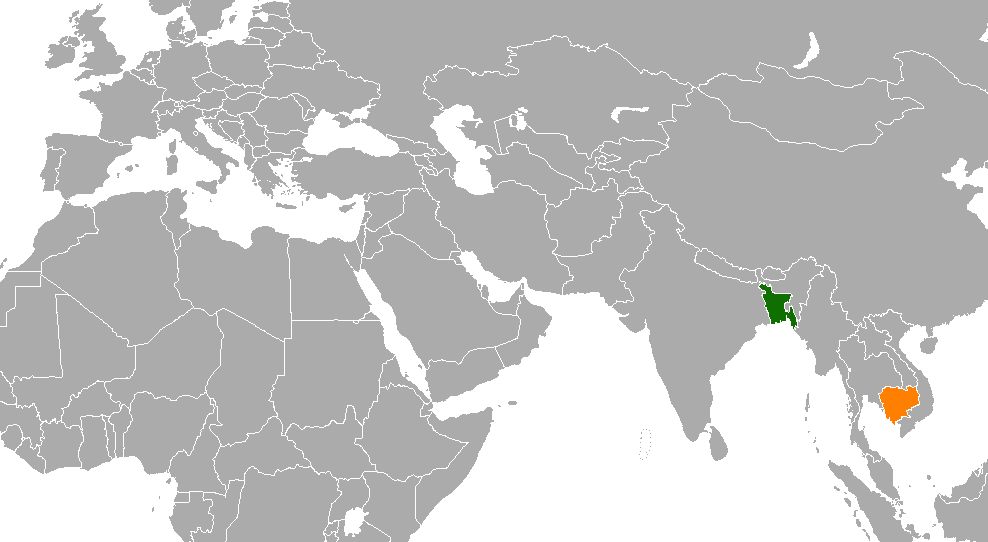

- Bangladesh: Cambodia

Bangladesh–Cambodia relations refer to the bilateral relations between Bangladesh and Cambodia.

== High level visits ==
In 2010, former Bangladesh's Foreign Minister Dipu Moni paid a visit to Phnom Penh. Cambodian Prime Minister Hun Sen paid an official visit to Dhaka in 2014. In 2017, Prime Minister Sheikh Hasina signed 9 deals in Phnom Penh.

== Cooperations ==
Bangladesh and Cambodia cooperate in various sectors. In 2010, the two countries agreed to form a joint commission for bilateral cooperation between their foreign ministries. In 2013, they signed a visa exemption agreement for diplomatic passport holders. Cambodia expressed interest in recruiting teachers from Bangladesh to develop its human resources. In 2014, the two countries signed an agreement to establish a joint commission to explore new areas of cooperation and strengthen the existing cooperation in various sectors.

=== Culture ===
In 2014, an agreement was signed between Bangladesh and Cambodia on cultural cooperation.

=== Agriculture ===
Bangladesh sought long-term land lease for contract farming in Cambodia by Bangladeshi nationals. Bangladesh is interested in a long-term rice import agreement with Cambodia. Bangladesh offered scholarships to Cambodian students to Bangladesh Agriculture University. The two countries jointly perform agricultural research. In 2014, Bangladesh and Cambodia signed an MoU on scientific and technical cooperation in agricultural sector.

=== Trade and investments ===
In 2006, the two countries approved a trade and investment agreement and granted each other most favored nation status. Bangladesh's chief exports to Cambodia include garments, footwear and leather goods, knitwear, pharmaceuticals, tableware, home linen, textile, seafood and marine products, tea, potatoes, jute and jute goods, light engineering products, spices, cosmetics, ceramic and melamine products, toiletries etc.

Cambodia mainly exports cotton, edible oil, fertilizer, clinker, staple fibre, yarn, etc. to Bangladesh. In 2014, the two countries agreed to form a joint trade council to be headed by commerce ministers of both countries. An agreement was also signed between the two countries for promotion and reciprocal protection of bilateral investments.
