= 2024 floods of Bangladesh =

Natural disasters in Bangladesh

Bangladesh, being situated on the Brahmaputra River Delta (also known as the Ganges Delta) is a land of many rivers, and as a result, is very prone to flooding. Due to being part of such a basin and being less than 5 meters above mean sea level, Bangladesh faces the cumulative effects of floods due to water flashing from nearby hills, the accumulation of the inflow of water from upstream catchments, and locally heavy rainfall enhanced by drainage congestion. Bangladesh faces this problem almost every year.

== June ==
Flooding from prolonged heavy rains on 18–19 June inundated the Haor region in Northeastern Bangladesh, with Sylhet district experiencing 242 mm of rainfall, and the Sunamganj district experiencing 223 mm, exceeding the monthly average for both.

The resulting flash floods and landslides affected at least 2.1 million people throughout Bangladesh, requiring nearly 30,000 people to evacuate to shelter centers. In Northeast Bangladesh, several displaced families were observed wandering for shelter. Nearly 75% of the area of Sylhet District was flooded, which included 23 Sylhet city wards as well as 1,548 villages in thirteen administrative divisions, affecting over 825,000 people directly. In Sunamganj District, flooding affected at least 560,000 people. UNICEF reports stated that 772,000 children were affected by flash flooding in Bangladesh's Northeastern regions. European Commission reports claimed that at least 15 people killed from landslides and 51,000 people displaced. It also noted that over half of the farmland and paddy fields in the Sylhet District were submerged.

From 18 to 19 June 2024, heavy rainfall struck multiple refugee camps in Cox's Bazar in Southeastern Bangladesh, causing widespread flooding and at least 773 landslide incidents. At least ten people died, seven of whom were Rohingya refugees, while nearly 8,000 people across 1,200 different shelters in 33 refugee camps were also affected.

== August ==
On August 21, 2024, heavy rainfall coupled with a surge of water from Indian dams caused flash floods in Bangladesh. The next day, Nahid Islam, an advisor to the interim government, said that India had deliberately released water by opening the dam's gates without prior notice showcasing their inhumanity and non-cooperation with Bangladesh. India has also allegedly violated international law in relation to the management of transboundary water resources, local media reports.

On August 22, in a courtesy meeting with Professor Mohammad Yunus, Chief Adviser to Bangladesh's interim government, Indian High Commissioner Pranay Kumar Verma claimed that the water released from a dam was due to natural automatic processes triggered by rising water levels upstream in India.

The flood affected at least 11 districts in northeastern and southeastern Bangladesh. As of August 31, 2024, the disaster has resulted in over 50 fatalities and has impacted approximately 5.8 million people. Total damage estimated by the Centre for Policy Dialogue reached Tk144 billion (US$1.2 billion).

== October ==
In October, heavy rains in the Indian state of Meghalaya caused flooding in the downstream plain areas comprising the border upazilas of Sherpur, Mymensingh and Netrokona districts. Over 60,000 families were displaced by the flooding, which killed 11 people, all in Sherpur district. 92,000 hectares of farmland were completely or partially destroyed with losses estimated at 1144 crore taka, with losses also to fishers.

== Humanitarian support ==
Several organizations and individuals were involved in humanitarian response activities during the crisis. Taqwa Foundation Bangladesh established a temporary relief center at Rowzatul Uloom Madrasa near the Dhaka–Chittagong Highway, where it organized the distribution of emergency supplies to those affected. The Hafezzi Charitable Society of Bangladesh also engaged in relief activities, providing rehabilitation services and organizing free medical camps for the impacted population. Al-Markazul Islami launched free medical camps beginning on August 25, providing healthcare to approximately 13,000 individuals, and continued operations until September, distributing 55 metric tons of food, 15,000 units of 5-liter purified water bottles, conducting rescue missions, and recovering bodies from flood-affected areas. Additionally, the Deputy Commissioner’s Office in Feni arranged accommodation for its workers at the Shilpakala Academy.
