= Bangladesh–Singapore relations =

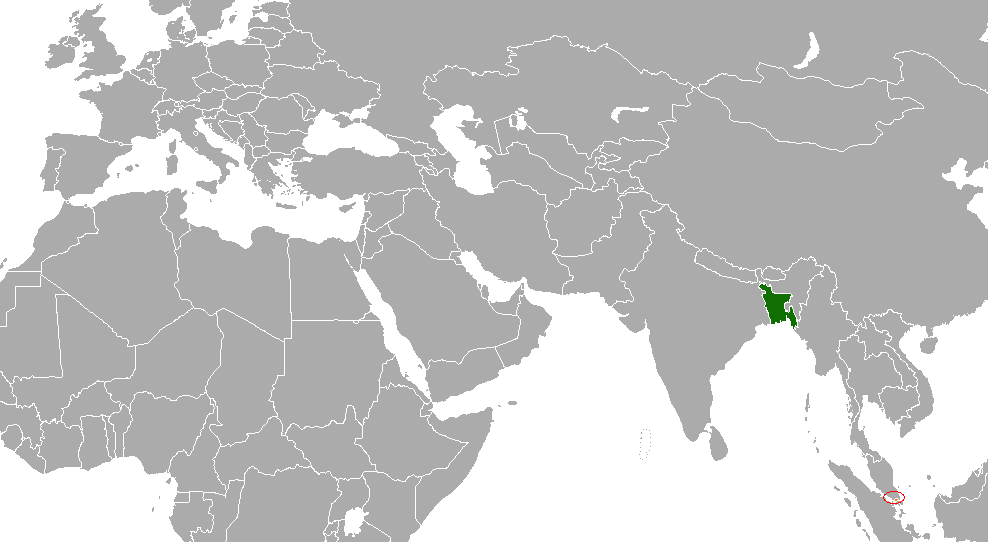

- Bangladesh: Singapore

Bangladesh–Singapore relations refer to the bilateral relations between Bangladesh and Singapore.

== History ==
=== Pre-contemporary era ===
Bengal and Singapore (as part of the Straits Settlements) were both part of the Bengal Presidency from 1830 to 1851.

=== Contemporary era ===
Singapore recognised Bangladesh in February 1972 after its independence. Mustafizur Rahman is the Bangladeshi High Commissioner to Singapore. The president of Bangladesh, Zillur Rahman died in a hospital in Singapore on 20 March 2013.

On 20 January 2016 Singapore deported 27 construction workers from Bangladesh for planning terrorist attacks in Bangladesh. The group was described as the first foreign terrorist group in Singapore. Bangladesh filed terrorism related cases against 14 of them. On 3 May 2016 eight more workers from Bangladesh were deported for having ties with the Islamic State terror group.

On 9 August 2016, Bangladesh and Singapore signed an agreement to produce a joint power plant. Senior Minister of State for Defence and Foreign Affairs Maliki Osman toured Bangladesh from 24 to 26 October 2016. He talked about improving relations and anti terrorism cooperation.

== Economic relations ==
Singapore is one of the biggest markets for the export of manpower from Bangladesh. Many Bangladeshis visit Singapore as a popular nearby travel destination; Dhaka and Singapore are 4 hours away by flight as Singapore Airlines operates flight to and from Bangladesh, while Biman Bangladesh Airlines flights to and from Singapore.
