= Nasim Ferdous =

Bangladeshi diplomat

- নাসিম ফেরদৌস

Ambassador of Bangladesh to Egypt
- In office 14 May 2006 – 1 November 2007
- Preceded by: Rezaul Karim
- Succeeded by: Nasima Haider

Ambassador of Bangladesh to Indonesia
- In office 31 October 2002 – 21 April 2006
- Preceded by: M Afsarul Qader
- Succeeded by: Salma Khan

Personal details
- Education: University of Dhaka (MA); Vrije Universiteit Brussel (LLM); Harvard Kennedy School (MPA)

Nasim Ferdous is a former Bangladeshi career diplomat. She joined the foreign service in 1977. She is the first woman to enter in foreign service in Bangladesh. She was also ambassador to Papua New Guinea, East Timor, Cyprus, and Egypt.

== Career ==
Ferdous became the first woman to join the Bangladesh Foreign Service in 1977.

Ferdous served as an ambassador to Indonesia from 2002 to 2006. She retired from the service in 2008.

Ferdous is also an executive director of Bangladesh Alliance for Women Leadership (BDAWL) and chairperson of the Home Economics Association.
