= Mohamed Mijarul Quayes =

Bangladeshi diplomat

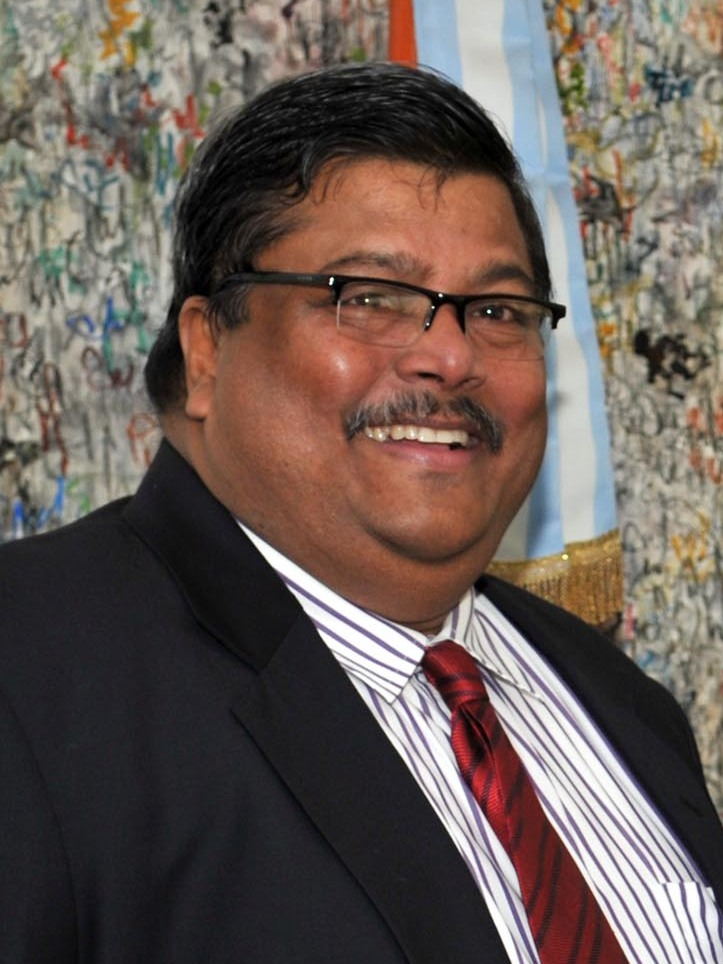
- Quayes in 2011

Ambassador of Bangladesh to Brazil
- In office 25 September 2012 – 11 March 2017
- President: Zillur Rahman; Abdul Hamid
- Prime Minister: Sheikh Hasina
- Preceded by: M Shameem Ahsan
- Succeeded by: Zulfiqur Rahman

Ambassador of Bangladesh to Russia
- In office 3 August 2008 – 7 July 2009
- Preceded by: Amir Hussain Sikder
- Succeeded by: Saiful Hoque

High Commissioner of Bangladesh to the Maldives
- In office 13 September 2005 – 8 April 2008
- President: Iajuddin Ahmed
- Prime Minister: Khaleda Zia; Iajuddin Ahmed (acting); Fazlul Haque (acting); Fakhruddin Ahmed (acting)
- Preceded by: Abdullah Al Hassan
- Succeeded by: Selina Mohsin

Personal details
- Born: 2 April 1960 Kishorganj, East Pakistan, Pakistan
- Died: 10 March 2017 (aged 56) Brasília, Brazil
- Education: University of Dhaka; Harvard University

Mohamed Mijarul Quayes (2 April 1960 – 10 March 2017) was a Bangladeshi civil service officer and diplomat. He was appointed Bangladesh's ambassador to the Federative Republic of Brazil in 2012 till 2017 and high commissioner to the Court of St James's in the United Kingdom from 2012 to 2014. Prior to this, Quayes served as foreign secretary at the Ministry of Foreign Affairs for the government of Bangladesh. He was previously the Bangladeshi ambassador to the Russian Federation and served as high commissioner to the Maldives prior to his posting to Moscow.

== Education ==
Quayes was born in Kishoreganj of then East Pakistan, Pakistan (now in Dhaka Division, Bangladesh). He was educated at Dhaka Residential Model College, the Department of International Relations at Dhaka University and furthermore, the John F. Kennedy School of Government at Harvard University. He was an Edward S. Mason Fellow in Public Policy and Management and studied under Amartya Sen, Robert Nozick, Shirley Williams, Richard Neustad, Ernest May and Robert Vogel at Harvard. At Dhaka University, he was a fellow of the Centre for Alternatives.

== Career ==
Mijarul Quayes was a Bangladesh Civil Service Cadre of 1982. Following his civil service training, he was posted in Tokyo, Japan and served as counsellor in Geneva, Switzerland and Singapore. He worked as director personnel and as director general for South Asia, SAARC, NAM at the Ministry of Foreign Affairs for Bangladesh following these postings.

He was appointed as high commissioner to the Maldives and presented his credentials to Maumoon Abdul Gayoom in 2005. In 2008, he headed Bangladesh's mission in Moscow as ambassador extraordinary and plenipotentiary of Bangladesh to Russia.

Mijarul Quayes took office as foreign secretary for the Bangladesh in 2009. His tenure as foreign secretary is noted for overseeing the facilitation of movement on longstanding issues with Bangladesh's neighbours. Quayes is remembered in his capacity as foreign secretary for leading regional initiatives and issues of global import ranging from human rights to disarmament, trade to sustainable development, gender, inclusion and empowerment and peace-building and for highlighting the consequences of climate change induced displacement for climate vulnerable nations like Bangladesh.

Upon completion of his tenure as foreign secretary, Quayes was appointed high commissioner to the United Kingdom. In April 2014, Quayes was transferred from his post as high commissioner in the United Kingdom to ambassador of Bangladesh to Brazil. He replaced M Shameem Ahsan who was appointed the permanent representative of Bangladesh to the United Nations in Geneva. This was reshuffle was regarded as a less prestigious posting for Quayes and is attributed to the Bangladeshi government being unhappy with his performance as high commissioner and not securing congratulatory remarks from the British government for Sheikh Hasina for winning the 2014 Bangladeshi general election.

Quayes was a life member of the UN Association of Bangladesh. He was elected in 2012 to the International Civil Service Commission and previously served as a member of the UNHRC's working group on migrants and human rights from 1997 to 1998. He taught at North South University and BRAC University in Dhaka and was a resource for the Foreign Service Academy, the National Defence College and the Public Administration Training Centre. A noted art critic in Bangladesh, Quayes also taught aesthetics and the history of art at the National Academy of the Arts in Dhaka.

== Death ==
In February 2017, Mijarul Quayes was taken to a hospital in Brasília. He died from multiple organ failure on 10 March. He is survived by his wife and two daughters.
