= Golam Mohammad (diplomat) =

Bangladeshi diplomat

- গোলাম মোহাম্মদ

Ambassador of Bangladesh in Greece
- In office 2013 – September 2014
- Succeeded by: Md. Jashim Uddin

Ambassador of Bangladesh to Indonesia
- In office 2 June 2010 – 31 January 2013
- Preceded by: Salma Khan
- Succeeded by: Md. Nazmul Quaunine

Ambassador of Bangladesh to Jordan

Golam Mohammad is a Bangladeshi diplomat. He served as an ambassador of Bangladesh to Greece, Indonesia and Jordan.

== Career ==
Golam Mohammad belonged to the 1982 batch of Bangladesh Civil Service (foreign affairs) cadre. He had served in Bangladesh embassies in Dubai, Karachi, Cairo and Canberra.

In September 2014, the government of Bangladesh called Mohammad back from his role in Greece as he was found guilty of sexually harassing a Bangladeshi-origin Greek lady who was a female official of the International Organization for Migration (IOM).
