= Bangladesh–Philippines relations =

- Bangladesh: Philippines

Bangladesh–Philippines relations refer to the bilateral relations between Bangladesh and Philippines.

== History ==
Relations between the Philippines and Bangladesh predate the modern establishment of these nations. Seafarers in the Bay of Bengal where modern Bangladesh is now located in, have been sailing and trading with Southeast Asia (the Philippines included) since the early Christian era. In the 900s the Gupta Empire which had territory in Bangladesh spread South Asian culture to Southeast Asia (Including the Philippines) via trade. It may be in this era when Bangel, Srivijaya, and South India were under the same Chola dynasty and also when the half-Malay and half-Tamil Cholan prince Sri Lumay founded the Rajahnate of Cebu. Later, in the midst of the Spanish colonial times, Bengal and South India have been a leading source of slave labour for the Philippines during the majority of the era.

The Philippines as an independent nation, recognized Bangladesh on 24 February 1972, and established diplomatic ties. It was one of the first countries to recognise Bangladesh after its Independence in 1971. Bangladesh opened an embassy in the Philippines in 1981. Prime Minister Ataur Rahman Khan visited the Philippines in 1985. Prime Minister Sheikh Hasina visited in September 1997. Bangladesh has a resident embassy in the Philippines and the Philippines has a resident ambassador in Bangladesh.

== Economic relations ==
Bangladesh imported goods worth US$78.22 million and imported goods from the Philippines worth US$19.32 million 2013-2014 fiscal year. Bangladesh is the third largest trading partner of the Philippines in South Asia. In February 2016, US$81 million was stolen from Bangladesh Bank and was laundered through a bank in the Philippines. The Philippines has repatriated $15 million of the stolen money.
