= Nasima Haider =

Bangladeshi diplomat

- নাসিমা হায়দার

Bangladesh High Commissioner to Cyprus
- In office January 2009 – January 2010

Ambassador of Bangladesh to Egypt
- In office 26 January 2008 – 15 January 2009
- Preceded by: Nasim Firdaus
- Succeeded by: Ashraf Uddin

Bangladesh High Commissioner to South Africa
- In office July 2005 – January 2008

Nasima Haider is a former Bangladeshi career diplomat.

== Early life and education ==
Haider completer her graduation and post-graduation from University of Dhaka in English literature.

== Career ==
Haider joined Bangladesh Civil Service as (Foreign Affairs) cadre in 1981. She has served in Bangladesh embassies in Canada, France, Indonesia, and Pakistan.

Haider was the Director General in charge of the Americas and the Pacific Wing at the Ministry of Foreign Affairs. In May 2005, she was appointed High Commissioner of Bangladesh to South Africa.
