= Mohammed Shahidul Islam =

Bangladeshi diplomat

High Commissioner of Bangladesh to Malaysia
- In office 11 February 2015 – 1 December 2020
- Succeeded by: Md. Golam Sarwar

Personal details
- Education: Université Libre de Bruxelles; University of Dhaka; Rajshahi University
- Profession: Diplomat

Mohammed Shahidul Islam is a Bangladeshi career diplomat and the former High Commissioner of Bangladesh to Malaysia. Over his extensive diplomatic career, he has held ambassadorial and high-level posts in various countries and international organizations, including the OIC, Ethiopia, and the Kingdom of Saudi Arabia.

== Early life and education ==
Islam was born on 3 May 1955 in Sirajganj. He completed his Bachelor of Science from Rajshahi University in 1979 and a master’s degree in Mass Communication and Journalism from the University of Dhaka in 1982. He finished a second master’s degree in International Politics from the Université Libre de Bruxelles, Belgium in 1994.

Islam also attended numerous professional and diplomatic training programs, including a summer course at The Hague Academy of International Law (1989), a course on U.S. foreign policy at Princeton University (1997), and a diploma in Diplomatic Relations from the International Institute of Administrative Sciences.

== Career ==
Islam served as Chairman of the Presidium body of Ananaya Academy, a literary and cultural organisation, from 1976 to 1982.

Islam began his diplomatic service on 21 January 1986 when he joined the Ministry of Foreign Affairs. He initially served as Assistant Secretary in 1987 and again in 1989, including in the Personnel-1 Division. From 1989 to 1991, he worked as Assistant and Senior Assistant Secretary in the International Organisation Wing of the Ministry of Foreign Affairs. Between 1991 and 1994, he was posted at the Embassy of Bangladesh in Brussels as Second and then First Secretary. In 1995, he was transferred to the Bangladesh High Commission in Colombo, where he served as First Secretary and Counsellor until 1996.

From 1996 to 1998, Islam served as Director of the Americas and Pacific Wing at the Ministry of Foreign Affairs in Dhaka. He was then posted as Counsellor at the Embassy of Bangladesh in Abu Dhabi from 1998 to 2000. Between 2000 and 2003, he served as Counsellor, Minister, and Chargé d'affaires ad interim at the Embassy of Bangladesh in Rome. From 2003 to 2005, he worked as Consul General at the Consulate General of Bangladesh in Los Angeles. In 2005, he was appointed Director General (Far East), and in December of that year, he also held responsibilities as Director General for the Americas & Pacific regions.

From 2006 to March 2008, Islam continued to serve as Director-General (Far East) and Director-General (Consular and Welfare) at the Ministry of Foreign Affairs. He was then posted as High Commissioner to South Africa from March 2008 to December 2010, with concurrent accreditation to Angola, Botswana, Mozambique, Namibia, Zambia, and Zimbabwe. From December 2010 to February 2015, he served as Bangladesh’s Ambassador to the Kingdom of Saudi Arabia. During this period, he also held concurrent appointments: as Permanent Representative to the Organisation of Islamic Cooperation (OIC) from March 2011, and as Ambassador to Ethiopia from December 2011 to February 2015. His term was extended by one year from an initial three year appointment.

On 11 February 2015, Islam assumed the role of High Commissioner of Bangladesh to Malaysia, a position he held until 2020. Golam Sarwar replaced him as the High Commissioner of Bangladesh to Malaysia in September 2020.

== Personal life ==
Islam is married and has two daughters. He is fluent in English and French.
