= Md. Nazmul Quaunine =

Bangladeshi diplomat

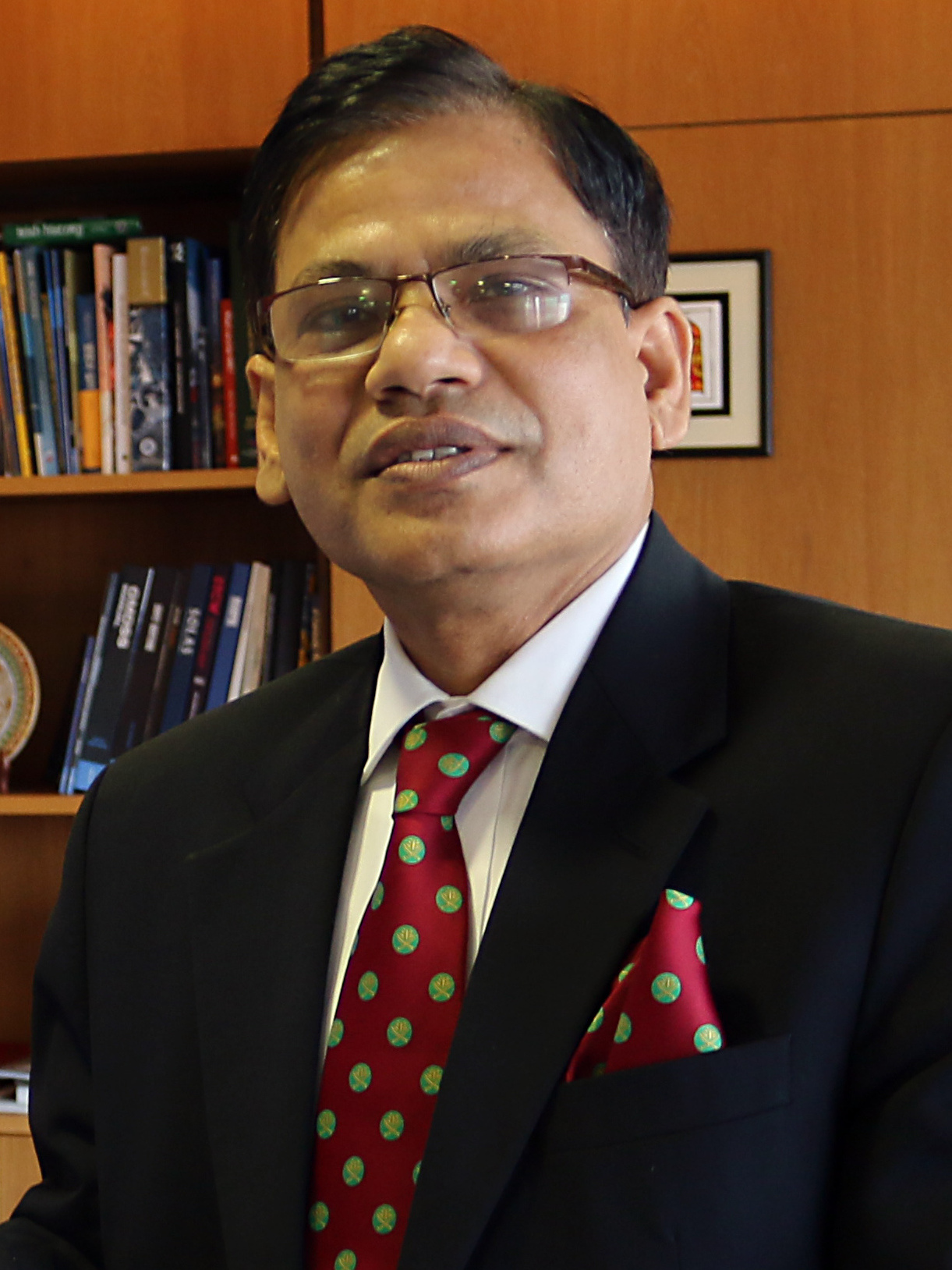
- Quaunine in 2017

Ambassador of Bangladesh to Thailand
- In office 23 November 2018 – 27 September 2020
- Preceded by: Saida Muna Tasneem
- Succeeded by: Mohammed Abdul Hye

Ambassador of Bangladesh to Indonesia
- In office 15 February 2013 – 21 October 2016
- Preceded by: Golam Mohammad
- Succeeded by: Azmal Kabir

Ambassador of Bangladesh to United Arab Emirates
- In office 26 March 2008 – January 2013
- Succeeded by: A. T. M. Nazimullah Chowdhury

Personal details
- Education: Dhaka Medical College

Md. Nazmul Quaunine is a Bangladeshi diplomat and former High Commissioner of Bangladesh to the United Kingdom. He is former ambassador of Bangladesh to the United Arab Emirates.

== Early life ==
Quaunine completed his medical degree at the Dhaka Medical College. He studied Diplomacy and International Relations at the Geneva Graduate Institute.

== Career ==
Quaunine in Dili (2013)

Quaunine joined the foreign service through the Bangladesh Civil Service in 1985.

Quaunine served as the ambassador of Bangladesh to United Arab Emirates. Under him, the United Arab Emirates stopped issuing all visas to Bangladeshis in October 2012.

In September 2016, Quaunine was appointed the High Commissioner of Bangladesh to the United Kingdom. He was serving as the ambassador of Bangladesh to Indonesia.

Quaunine was appointed ambassador of Bangladesh to Thailand while Saida Muna Tasneem replaced him in United Kingdom. He was concurrently accredited as ambassador of Bangladesh to Cambodia. He was the Permanent Representative of Bangladesh to the United Nations Economic and Social Commission for Asia and the Pacific. In May 2020, he was elected chair of the 76th Commission of Session of the United Nations Economic and Social Commission for Asia and the Pacific.
