= S. M. Ikramul Haque =

Bangladeshi diplomat and army general

S. M. Ikramul Haque is a retired major general of the Bangladesh Army and former ambassador of Bangladesh to Saudi Arabia. He was the Chief of the General Staff of the Bangladesh Army.

== Career ==
In 1997, Haque attended the Annual Military Operations and Law Conference hosted by the U. S. Pacific Command.

Haque was the Chief of the General Staff of the Bangladesh Army. In October 2003, he received the Chief of General Staff of Pakistan Army, Lieutenant General Shahid Aziz, after he arrived for an official trip to Dhaka.

Haque was appointed ambassador of Bangladesh to Saudi Arabia in October 2004, replacing Syed S. K. Sharjil Hassan. He was also the Permanent Representative of Bangladesh to the Organisation of Islamic Cooperation (OIC). He worked to ensure continued access for Bangladeshi workers to the Saudi market. Abdul Jalil, the general secretary of the Awami League, demanded his removal, along with 18 other ambassadors who had been given contractual appointments in 2006. He met with Saudi Shura Council Salih bin Abdullah al-Humaid to discuss negative publicity against Bangladeshi workers in Saudi Arabia. He served as the ambassador until July 2008 before being replaced by M. Fazlul Karim.

Haque was the registrar of Stamford University Bangladesh.
