= Embassy of Bangladesh, Warsaw =

Diplomatic mission of Bangladesh to Poland

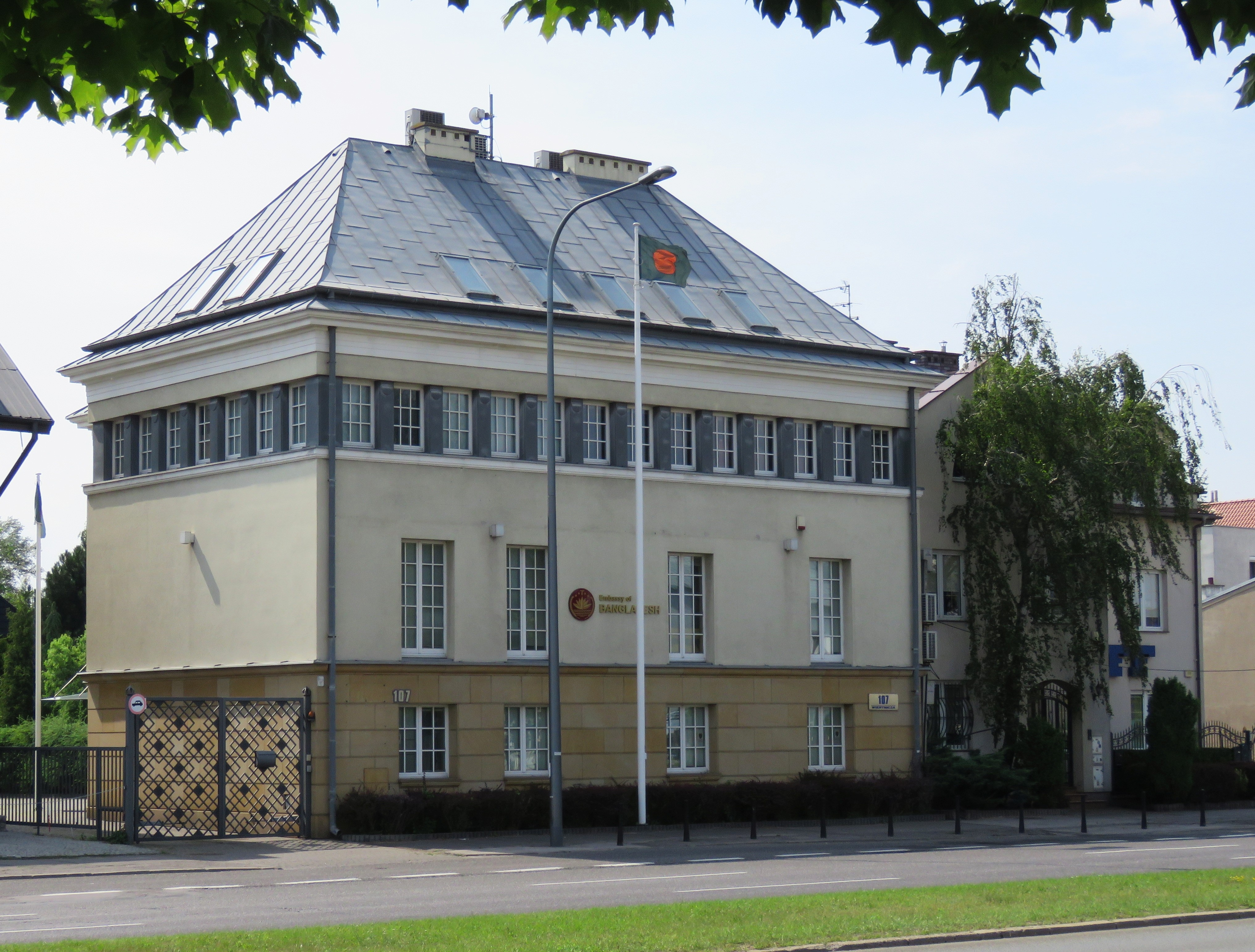
- Embassy of Bangladesh, Warsaw
- Location: Warsaw, Poland
- Address: Wierznica 107, 02-952
- Coordinates: 52°10′29″N 21°4′40″E
- Opened: 1972
- Ambassador: Md. Mainul Islam
- Jurisdiction: Poland; Lithuania; Latvia; Ukraine
- Website: Official website

The Embassy of Bangladesh in Warsaw, officially the Embassy of the People's Republic of Bangladesh in Poland, is the diplomatic mission of Bangladesh in Warsaw.

The Bangladeshi Ambassador in Warsaw is also accredited to Ukraine, Lithuania, and Latvia.

== History ==
Diplomatic relations between Poland and Bangladesh were officially established on January 12, 1972. Bangladesh opened its embassy in Warsaw, which operated from 1972 to 1978. This embassy closed in 2002, and for several years, Bangladesh was represented by its embassy in The Hague. In 2015, the embassy in Warsaw was reopened.

== Ambassador ==
Md. Mainul Islam has been serving as the Ambassador since April 2025.

The former Ambassadors were:

- Sultana Laila Hossain (2020–2024)
- Muhammad Rahman (2015–2020)
- Muhammad Ali Sorcar (2011–2015; The Hague)
- Mizanur Rahman (2009–2011; The Hague)
- Ismat Jahan (2006–2009; The Hague)
- M. Abdus Samad (2000–2002)
- Humayun A. Kamal (1998–2000)
- Ahmed Choudhury (1993–1998)
- Mr Khairul Anam (1991–1993)
- Khalequzzaman Chowdhury (1987–1991)
- K.M. Shehabuddin (1983–1987)
- Kamrul Hasan Sheikh (1982–1983)
- Mustafa Kamal (1979–1982)
- Abdul Adan (1978–1979)
- Khan Sarwar Murshid (1975–1978)
- Abdul Faiz Bashirul Alam (1972–1975)
- K.A.M. Salabuddin Ahmed (1972)

== See also ==
- List of diplomatic missions of Bangladesh
- List of diplomatic missions in Poland
- Bangladesh–Poland relations
- Bangladesh–Latvia relations
- Bangladesh–Ukraine relations
