= List of diplomatic missions in Poland =

This article lists diplomatic missions resident in the Republic of Poland. At present, the capital city of Warsaw hosts 97 embassies. Several countries have ambassadors accredited to Poland, with most being resident in Brussels, Berlin or Moscow. This listing excludes honorary consulates.

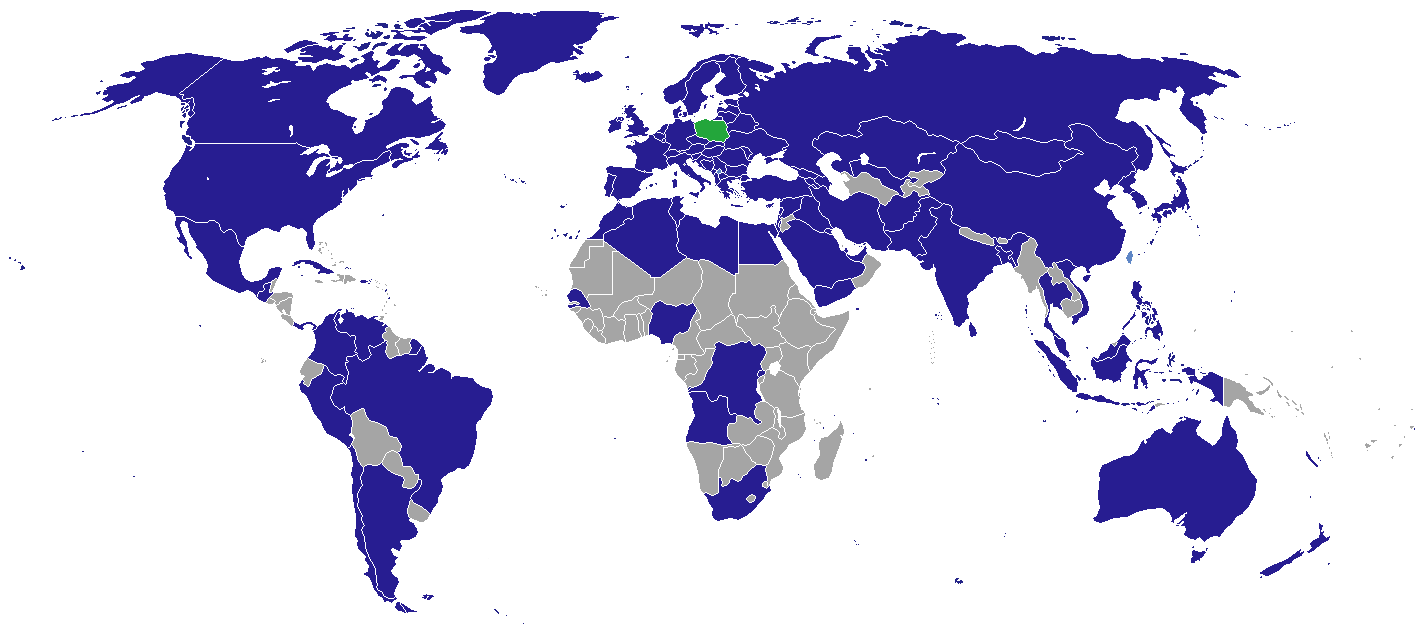
Map of diplomatic missions in Poland

== Diplomatic missions in Warsaw ==
Country	Mission type	Address	Photo	Website
Afghanistan	Embassy	ul. Goplańska 1		
Albania	Embassy	ul. Altowa 1		
Algeria	Embassy	ul. Ignacego Krasickiego 10		
Angola	Embassy	ul. Urodzajna 12		
Argentina	Embassy	Aleje Jerozolimskie 123a, 10th floor		
Armenia	Embassy	ul. Bekasow 50		
Australia	Embassy	Rondo ONZ 1, Rondo 1 Building, 8th floor		
Austria	Embassy	ul. Gagarina 34		
Azerbaijan	Embassy	ul. Zwycięzców 12		
Bangladesh	Embassy	ul. Wiertnicza 107		
Belarus	Embassy	ul. Wiertnicza 58		
Belgium	Embassy	ul. Senatorska 34		
Bosnia and Herzegovina	Embassy	ul. Ignacego Krasickiego 35		
Brazil	Embassy	ul. Bajońska 15		
Bulgaria	Embassy	Al. Ujazdowskie 33/35		
Canada	Embassy	ul. Jana Matejki 1/5		
Chile	Embassy	ul. Okrezna 62		
China	Embassy	ul. Bonifraterska 1		
Colombia	Embassy	ul. Zwycięzców 29		
Democratic Republic of the Congo	Embassy	ul. Bogatki 3		
Croatia	Embassy	Ignacego Krasickiego 25		
Cuba	Embassy	ul. Domaniewska 48		
Cyprus	Embassy	ul. Jarosława Dąbrowskiego 70		
Czech Republic	Embassy	ul. Koszykowa 18		
Denmark	Embassy	ul. Marszałkowska 142		
Egypt	Embassy	ul. Wiertnicza 154		
Estonia	Embassy	ul. Karwińska 1		
Finland	Embassy	ul. Chopina 4/8		
France	Embassy	Piekna 1		
Georgia	Embassy	ul. Kryniczna 2		
Germany	Embassy	ul. Jazdów 12		
Greece	Embassy	ul.Gornoslaska 35		
Guatemala	Embassy	Warsaw Financial Centre, ul. Emilii Plater 53, 21st floor		
Holy See	Apostolic Nunciature	al. Jana Chrystiana Szucha 12		
Hungary	Embassy	Stratos Office Center - Ks.Ignacego Skorupki 5 (temporary)		
Iceland	Embassy	Al. Armii Ludowej 26		
India	Embassy	ul. Mysliwiecka 2		
Indonesia	Embassy	ul. Estońska 3/5		
Iran	Embassy	Królowej Aldony 22		
Iraq	Embassy	Dąbrowiecka 9 A		
Ireland	Embassy	ul. Mysia 5, 6th Floor		
Israel	Embassy	Ludwika Krzywickiego 24		
Italy	Embassy	Plac Dabrowskiego, 6		
Japan	Embassy	ul. Szwoleżerów 8		
Kazakhstan	Embassy	ul. Królowej Marysieńki 14		
Kuwait	Embassy	ul. Krasickiego 26		
Latvia	Embassy	Królowej Aldony 19		
Lebanon	Embassy	Wiśniowa 40 m. 6/7		
Libya	Embassy	Żołny 26/26 B		
Lithuania	Embassy	Al. Ujazdowskie 14		
Luxembourg	Embassy	ul. Sloneczna 15		
Malaysia	Embassy	Warsaw Towers - ul. Sienna 39, 9th floor		
Malta	Embassy	ul. Wisniowa 40/4		
Mexico	Embassy	Aleje Jerozolimskie 123a, 20th floor		
Moldova	Embassy	ul. Imielińska 1		
Mongolia	Embassy	ul. Biedronki 13A		
Montenegro	Embassy	Aleje Ujazdowskie 41		
Morocco	Embassy	Dąbrowskiego 72		
Netherlands	Embassy	ul. Kawalerii 10		
New Zealand	Embassy	Al. Ujazdowskie 51		
Nigeria	Embassy	Kosiarzy 22 B		
North Korea	Embassy	Bobrowiecka 1 A		
North Macedonia	Embassy	Królowej Marysieńki 40		
Norway	Embassy	Al. Armii Ludowej 26		
Pakistan	Embassy	ul. Wiertnicza 63		
Palestine	Embassy	ul. L. Idzikowskiego 7/9		
Panama	Embassy	Królewicza Jakuba 33		
Peru	Embassy	Starościńska 1/3		
Philippines	Embassy	ul. Stanisława Lentza 11		
Portugal	Embassy	ul. Ateńska 37		
Qatar	Embassy	ul. Książęca 15		
Romania	Embassy	Fryderyka Chopina 10		
Russia	Embassy	ul. Belwederska 49		
Rwanda	Embassy	Karwińska 21		
Saudi Arabia	Embassy	Wiertnicza 30		
Senegal	Embassy	Janczarów 2B		
Serbia	Embassy	Al. Róż 5		
Slovakia	Embassy	ul. Litewska 6		
Slovenia	Embassy	al. Jana Chrystiana Szucha 19		
South Africa	Embassy	ul. Koszykowa 54		
South Korea	Embassy	Szwoleżerów 6		
Sovereign Military Order of Malta	Embassy	Jazgarzewska 17		
Spain	Embassy	Mysliwiecka 4		
Sri Lanka	Embassy	Wiertnicza 151		
Sweden	Embassy	ul. Bagatela 3		
Switzerland	Embassy	Aleje Ujazdowskie 27		
Syria	Embassy	Świeradowska 38 a		
Republic of China (Taiwan)	Taipei Representative Office	ul. Emilii Plater 53, 30th Floor		
Thailand	Embassy	ul. Willowa 7		
Tunisia	Embassy	Myśliwiecka 14		
Turkey	Embassy	Rakowiecka 19		
Ukraine	Embassy	ul. A.Malczewskiego 17		
United Arab Emirates	Embassy	Skylight building, Złota 59, floor 19		
United Kingdom	Embassy	ul. Kawalerii 12		
United States	Embassy	Aleje Ujazdowskie 29/31		
Uzbekistan	Embassy	Kraski 21		
Vietnam	Embassy	Resorowa 36		
Yemen	Embassy	Królewicza Jakuba 54		

== Consulates in Poland ==
Country	Mission type	City	Photo	Website
Austria	Consulate-General	Kraków		
Belarus	Consulate	Biała Podlaska		
Belarus	Consulate-General	Białystok		
France	Consulate-General	Kraków		
Germany	Consulate-General	Gdańsk		
Germany	Consulate-General	Kraków		
Germany	Consulate	Opole		
Germany	Consulate-General	Wrocław		
Hungary	Consulate-General	Gdańsk		
Hungary	Consulate-General	Kraków		
Hungary	Vice-Consulate	Wrocław		
Kosovo	Consulate General	Warsaw		
Lithuania	Consulate	Sejny		
Ukraine	Consulate-General	Gdańsk		
Ukraine	Consulate-General	Kraków		
Ukraine	Consulate-General	Lublin		
Ukraine	Consulate-General	Wrocław		
United States	Consulate-General	Kraków		

== Accredited embassies ==
=== Resident in Berlin, Germany ===
1. Bahrain
2. Bolivia
3. Botswana
4. Brunei
5. Burkina Faso
6. Cambodia
7. Cameroon
8. Cape Verde
9. Chad
10. Congo-Brazzaville
11. Djibouti
12. Dominican Republic
13. El Salvador
14. Eritrea
15. Ethiopia
16. Guinea
17. Honduras
18. Ivory Coast
19. Jamaica
20. Jordan
21. Kenya
22. Kyrgyzstan
23. Laos
24. Lesotho
25. Malawi
26. Mali
27. Mauritania
28. Mauritius
29. Monaco
30. Mozambique
31. Myanmar
32. Namibia
33. Nepal
34. Niger
35. Oman
36. Paraguay
37. Sudan
38. Tajikistan
39. Tanzania
40. Turkmenistan
41. Uganda
42. Venezuela
43. Zambia
44. Zimbabwe

=== Resident in Brussels, Belgium ===
1. Eswatini
2. Gambia
3. Maldives
4. Nicaragua
5. Papua New Guinea
6. Seychelles
7. Timor-Leste

=== Resident in other cities ===
1. Andorra (Andorra la Vella)
2. Bahamas (Nassau)
3. Barbados (London)
4. Benin (Paris)
5. Costa Rica (Bern)
6. Ecuador (Vienna)
7. Ghana (Prague)
8. Guinea-Bissau (Moscow)
9. Guyana (London)
10. San Marino (City of San Marino)
11. Singapore (Singapore)
12. Uruguay (Helsinki)

=== Other ===
1. Burundi (Moscow)
2. Micronesia (Palikir)
3. Marshall Islands (New York City)
4. Saint Vincent and the Grenadines (New York City)

== Closed missions ==
Host city	Sending country	Mission	Year closed	Ref.
Warsaw	Afghanistan	Embassy	2013	
Warsaw	Cambodia	Embassy (Note: Resident in Berlin, Germany)	2008	
Warsaw	Costa Rica	Embassy	2010	
Warsaw	East Germany (Note: The East German embassy was closed upon the reunification of Germany in 1990.)	Embassy	1990	
Warsaw	Ecuador	Embassy (Note: Resident in Vienna, Austria)	2014	
Warsaw	Gabon	Embassy	1979	
Warsaw	Ghana	Embassy (Note: Resident in Prague, Czech Republic)	1965	
Warsaw	Laos	Embassy	2010	
Warsaw	Nicaragua	Embassy (Note: Resident in Brussels, Belgium)	2010	
Warsaw	Uruguay	Embassy (Note: Resident in Helsinki, Uusimaa, Finland)	2021	
Warsaw	Venezuela	Embassy	2025	
Gdańsk	Belarus	Consulate-General	2018	
Gdańsk	Chile	Consulate	1985	
Gdańsk	China	Consulate-General	2024	
Gdańsk	Denmark	Consulate	1997	
Gdańsk	Norway	Consulate	2007	
Gdańsk	Sweden	Consulate-General	2008	
Gdańsk	Russia	Consulate-General	2025	
Katowice	France	Consulate	1952	
Katowice	Ukraine	Consulate	2016	
Kraków	Canada	Consulate-General	2005	
Kraków	Croatia	Consulate-General	2013	
Kraków	Russia	Consulate-General	2025	
Kraków	Slovakia	Consulate-General	2024	
Kraków	Switzerland	Consulate-General	2018	
Kraków	United Kingdom	Consulate-General	2021	
Łódź	Romania	Consulate-General	2007	
Lublin	Belarus	Consulate-General	2004	
Lublin	Slovakia	Consulate-General	2008	
Olsztyn	Lithuania	Consulate	2003	
Poznań	Hungarian People's Republic	Consulate	1987	
Poznań	Russia	Consulate-General	2024	
Rzeszów	Japan	Embassy Liaison Office	2023	
Szczecin	Austria	Consulate	1980	
Szczecin	Bulgaria	Consulate	Unknown	
Szczecin	Sweden	Consulate	1993	
Szczecin	United States	Consular Agency	2014	
Wrocław	Austria	Consulate-General	1992	
Wrocław	Bulgaria	Consulate-General	2000	
Wrocław	Slovakia	Consulate-General	Unknown	

== See also ==
- Foreign relations of Poland
- List of diplomatic missions of Poland
- Visa requirements for Polish citizens
