= Bangladesh–Poland relations =

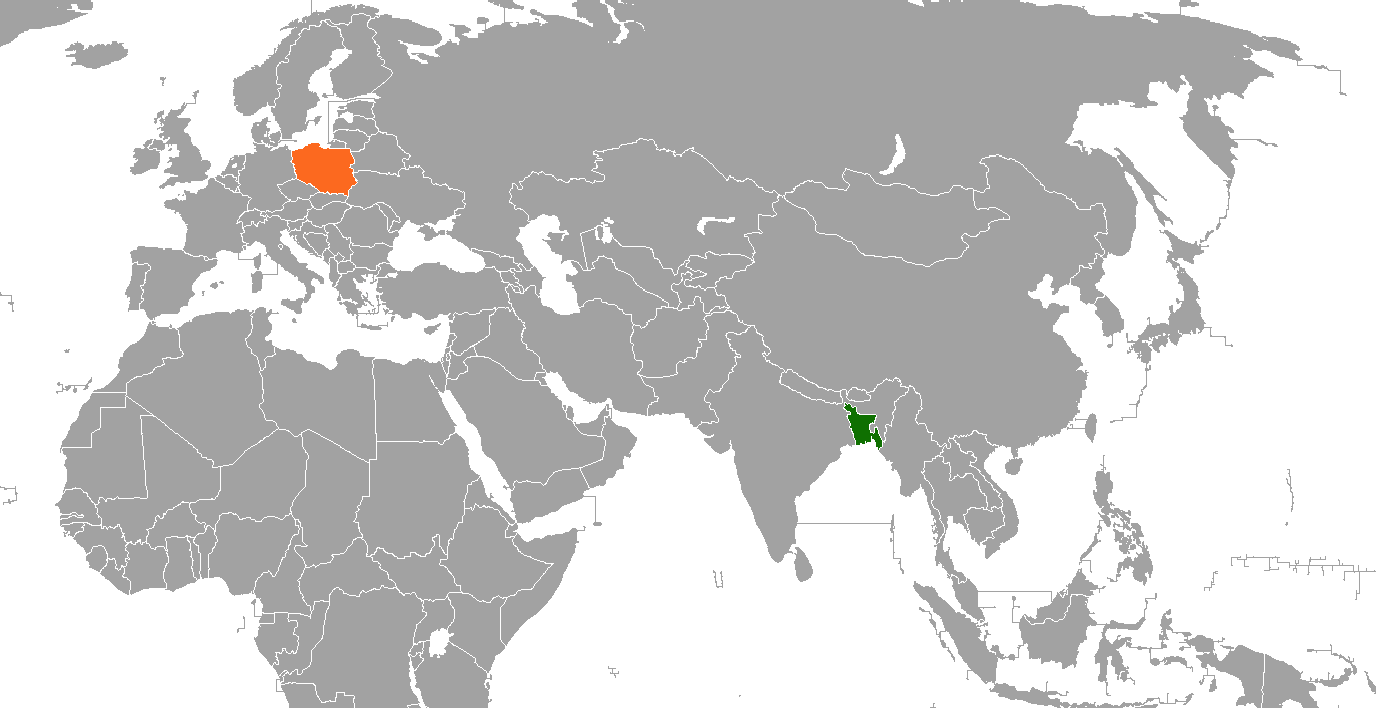

- Bangladesh: Poland

Diplomatic mission
- Embassy of Bangladesh, Warsaw: Embassy of Poland, New Delhi

Envoy
- Ambassador Md. Mainul Islam: Ambassador Piotr Świtalski

Bangladesh–Poland relations refer to the bilateral relations between Bangladesh and Poland. Poland was the sixth country to recognize Bangladesh. Diplomatic relations between the two countries were officially established on 12 January 1972. While Bangladesh has an embassy in Warsaw, the Polish ambassador to India, who is resident in New Delhi, is also accredited to Bangladesh.

== High level visits ==
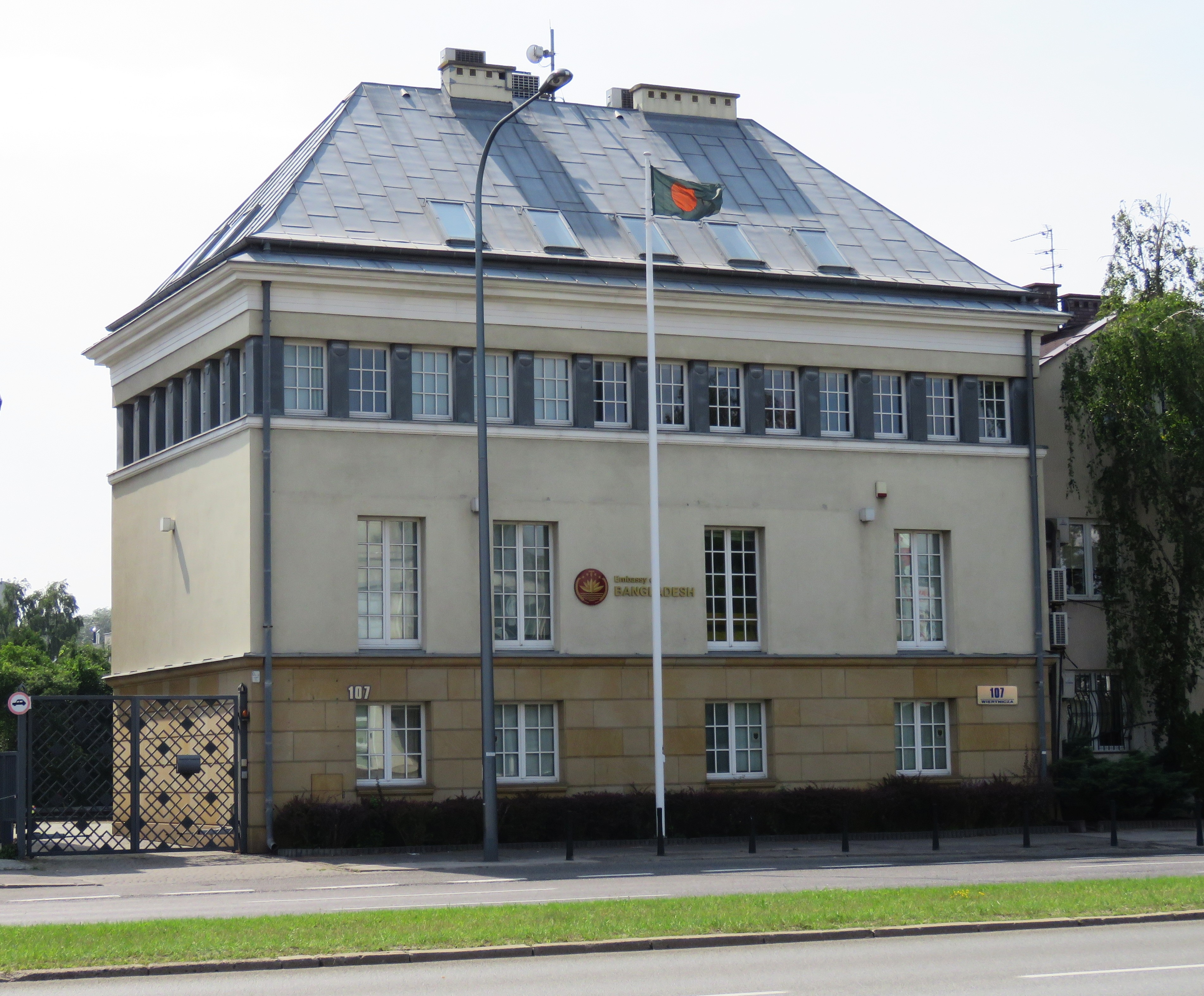
Embassy of Bangladesh in Warsaw

In 1986, former Deputy Foreign Minister of Poland paid an official visit to Dhaka. In 1987 the Foreign Minister of Bangladesh visited Poland. In 1988 former Foreign Minister of Bangladesh paid an official visit to Warsaw.

== Educational cooperation ==
In 2015, Polish ambassador Tomasz Łukaszuk met with the Vice Chancellor of the University of Dhaka Dr AAMS Arefin Siddique and had a discussion to boost the bilateral cooperation on research and educational sector.

== Economic cooperation ==
Bangladesh has long imported most of its dairy products as powdered milk from western Europe. In 1987 a 1600-ton shipment from Poland recorded radiation levels over 300 becquerels due to the Chernobyl nuclear disaster, causing a nationwide panic.

By 1997 bilateral trade was worth US$34.8 million. Bangladeshi exports were primarily tea (70% by value), but also included plastic products, garments, jute, and fish. High value Polish exports were base metals, dairy products, ships, paper products, machinery, equipment and chemicals.

Bangladesh and Poland have shown their deep interest to expand the bilateral economic activities between the two countries and have been taking necessary steps in this regard. Poland has become one of the new destinations for manpower export of Bangladesh. Bangladeshi ready made garments, pharmaceuticals, jute and jute goods, ceramics and leather and leather goods have been identified as products with huge potential in the Polish market. Besides, Polish firms have expressed their interest to invest in the energy sector of Bangladesh.

In November 2021, Poland donated 3,2 million COVID-19 vaccines to Bangladesh.

== Resident diplomatic missions ==
- Bangladesh has an embassy in Warsaw.
- Poland is accredited to Bangladesh from its embassy in New Delhi, India.

== See also ==
- Foreign relations of Bangladesh
- Foreign relations of Poland
- Bangladeshis in Poland
