= Md. Monirul Islam (diplomat) =

Ambassador of Bangladesh to Italy
- In office 10 October 2023 – 5 April 2024
- Preceded by: M. Shameem Ahsan
- Succeeded by: A. T. M. Rokebul Haque

Ambassador of Bangladesh to Egypt
- In office 18 July 2020 – 2 October 2023
- Preceded by: Muhammad Ali Sorcar
- Succeeded by: Samina Naz

Ambassador of Bangladesh to Ethiopia
- In office 1 March 2016 – 10 July 2020
- Preceded by: Position created
- Succeeded by: Md. Nazrul Islam

Personal details
- Born: Brahmanbaria District

Md. Monirul Islam is a Bangladeshi diplomat. He served as an ambassador of Bangladesh to Italy, Egypt, Ethiopia, and Morocco.

== Early life ==
Islam was born in Brahmanbaria District. He finished his Secondary and Higher Secondary Education with distinctions from Sreekail School, Muradnagar and Dhaka Residential Model School respectively. He completed a bachelor and master's in Economics from the University of Dhaka in 1985 and 1986 respectively. He completed a second master's in Foreign Affairs and Trade from Monash University in 1996.

== Career ==
Islam joined the foreign service cadre of Bangladesh Civil Service in 1991. He did professional courses and training in Canberra, New Delhi, Hawaii, Beijing and Rabat in different stages of his career. In the Ministry of Foreign Affairs, Islam worked with the desks of Administration, Africa, Welfare, West Asia, Economic Affairs and United Nations. He had served in the Bangladesh Embassies in Singapore, Spain, Beijing, Canada, and Brazil.

Islam was the Consul General of Bangladesh in New York City. He was the Director General of Southeast Asia, Africa and East Asia and Pacific at the Ministry of Foreign Affairs. In December 2013, he was appointed the Ambassador of Bangladesh to Morocco. In January 2016, He was appointed the first Ambassador of Bangladesh to Ethiopia while Sultana Laila Hossain replaced him as the Ambassador of Bangladesh to Morocco.

Islam was appointed the Ambassador of Bangladesh to Egypt in May 2020. He was serving as the Ambassador of Bangladesh to Ethiopia and concurrently the Permanent Representative of Bangladesh to the African Union.

In July 2023, Islam was appointed the ambassador of Bangladesh to Italy. He replaced ambassador Md Shameem Ahsan. Samina Naz was appointed to replace Islam as the ambassador of Bangladesh to Egypt.
