= Mosud Mannan =

Bangladeshi diplomat (born 1961)

His Excellency Mosud Mannan ndc

Ambassador of Bangladesh to Turkey
- In office October 22, 2020 – October 20, 2022
- President: Abdul Hamid
- Prime Minister: Sheikh Hasina
- Preceded by: M Allama Siddiki
- Succeeded by: M Amanul Haq

Bangladesh Ambassador to Uzbekistan
- In office September 16, 2013 – October 15, 2020
- Preceded by: Muhammad Imran
- Succeeded by: Zahangir Alam

Bangladesh Ambassador to Germany
- In office March 31, 2010 – February 17, 2013
- Preceded by: Abdul B. Manjoor Rahim
- Succeeded by: Muhammad Ali Sorcar

Bangladesh Ambassador to Morocco
- In office September 25, 2008 – March 25, 2010
- Succeeded by: Nur Mohammad (police officer)

Personal details
- Born: 21 April 1961 (age 65) Dhaka, Bangladesh
- Spouse: Nuzhat Amin Mannan
- Parent: M. A. Mannan (neurologist) (father)
- Education: The Fletcher School at Tufts University, National Defence College (Bangladesh), University of Dhaka
- Occupation: Diplomat

Mosud Mannan (born 21 April 1961) was a diplomat of the People's Republic of Bangladesh, who entered into retirement in October 2022. Between 22 October 2020 and 20 October 2022, he served as the ambassador of Bangladesh to the Republic of Turkey. Previously, he served as ambassador of Bangladesh to the Republic of Uzbekistan, concurrently accredited to the Islamic Republic of Afghanistan, the Republic of Kazakhstan and the Kyrgyz Republic from 16 September 2013 till 15 October 2020.

== Career ==
From 2000-2001, Mosud Mannan served as counsellor at the Bangladesh Permanent Mission to the United Nations and was an alternative representative of Bangladesh to the Security Council, as the country was elected as a non-permanent member of the Security Council at the time.

Mannan was Bangladesh's ambassador to the Kingdom of Morocco, with concurrent accreditation to the Republic of Mali, the Federal Republic of Nigeria, the Republic of Senegal and the Republic of Sierra Leone.

From 31 March 2010 till 17 February 2013, Mannan was ambassador to Germany, with concurrent accreditation to the Republic of Austria, the Czech Republic, Hungary, the Slovak Republic and the Republic of Slovenia. During his tenure, he was a representative of Bangladesh before the International Tribunal for the Law of the Sea in the dispute concerning delimitation of the maritime boundary between Bangladesh and Myanmar in the Bay of Bengal (Bangladesh/Myanmar).

Earlier in his diplomatic career, he served in various capacities in Bangladesh Missions in Beijing (minister and deputy chief of mission), New York City (counsellor-minister), Muscat (counsellor) and London (second secretary-counsellor). At the Ministry of Foreign Affairs of Bangladesh, he held different positions, including Director General (International Organisations) and Deputy Chief of Protocol.
