= M. Shameem Ahsan =

Bangladeshi diplomat

- এম. শামীম আহসান
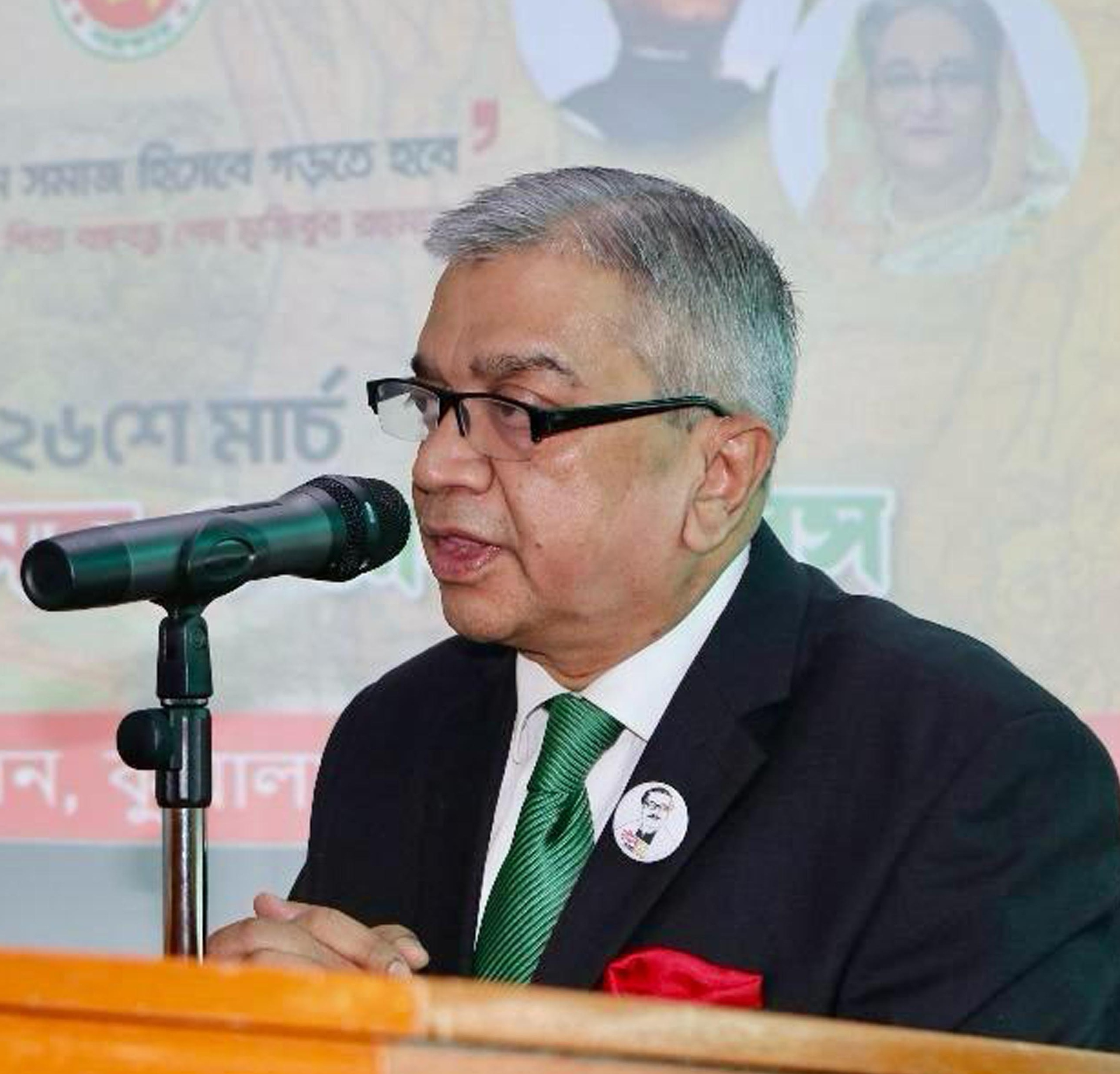
- Ahsan in 2024

High Commissioner of Bangladesh to Malaysia
- In office 19 October 2023 – August 2025
- Succeeded by: Manjurul Karim Khan Chowdhury

Ambassador of Bangladesh to Italy
- In office 21 November 2020 – 9 October 2023
- Preceded by: Abdus Sobhan Sikder
- Succeeded by: Md. Monirul Islam

High Commissioner of Bangladesh to Nigeria
- In office June 2018 – November 2020
- Preceded by: Kazi Sharif Kaikobad
- Succeeded by: Masudur Rahman

Personal details
- Born: 1 September 1966 (age 60) Pirojpur District, East Pakistan, Pakistan

M. Shameem Ahsan (born 1 September 1966) is a retired Bangladeshi diplomat and a former High Commissioner of Bangladesh to Malaysia, and an Ambassador to Italy and Nigeria.

Ahsan had served as the director general of external publicity and director general of Europe at the Ministry of Foreign Affairs.

== Early life ==
Ahsan was born on 1 September 1966 in Pirojpur District, East Pakistan, Pakistan. He completed his undergraduate and master's in political science from the University of Dhaka. He completed the National Defence Course from the National Defence College.

== Career ==
Ahsan joined the 11th batch of Bangladesh Civil Service in the foreign service cadre in 1993. From 1993 to 1995, he was the assistant secretary at the SAARC, Multilateral Economic Affairs, Americas and Pacific desks at the Ministry of Foreign Affairs. From September 1995 to January 1997, he was the third secretary at the Embassy of Bangladesh in Kuwait. In 1997, Ahsan studied Arabic at the Kuwait University.

Ahsan was the second and then first secretary at the Embassy of Bangladesh in Kenya from December 1997 to February 2002. He was then appointed assistant secretary at the Ministry of Foreign Affairs. From May 2002 to September 2004, he was the director of SAARC at the Ministry of Foreign Affairs. From September 2004 to August 2008, he was a counsellor at the embassy of Bangladesh in Italy.

Ahsan was the deputy chief of mission at the Embassy of Bangladesh in the United States from September 2008 to February 2011. He was the director general of external publicity from March 2011 to January 2012. He was the director general of Europe at the Ministry of Foreign Affairs from January to April 2013. He was the director general of external publicity from January 2013 to April 2014.

Ahsan was the consul general of Bangladesh in New York City from April 2014 to May 2018. Ahsan was appointed the ambassador of Bangladesh to Nigeria in March 2018. He served in Nigeria till November 2020. He was accredited as the ambassador of Bangladesh to Angola, Ambassador of Bangladesh to Gambia, ambassador of Bangladesh to Liberia and ambassador of Bangladesh to the Republic of Congo during his time in Nigeria.

In August 2020, Ahsan was appointed the ambassador of Bangladesh to Italy. In July 2023, the government of Bangladesh decided to appoint him the next high commissioner of Bangladesh to Malaysia replacing Ambassador Md Golam Sarwar. He would be replaced by Md. Monirul Islam, ambassador of Bangladesh to Egypt.

== Personal life ==
Ahsan is married to Pandora Chowdhury.

== See also ==
M Shameem Ahsan, joined the Bangladesh Civil Service in the foreign service cadre in 1984.
