= M. Wahidur Rahman =

Bangladeshi diplomat

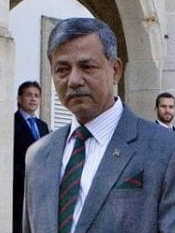
- Rahman receiving a guard of honour in Nicosia, Cyprus (2014)

Ambassador of Bangladesh to Egypt
- In office 23 August 2014 – 22 August 2016
- Preceded by: Mizanur Rahman
- Succeeded by: Muhammad Ali Sorcar

Personal details
- Education: University of Chittagong

M. Wahidur Rahman is a Bangladeshi diplomat who was ambassador to Kenya and Egypt between 2011 and 2016. He also served as ambassador extraordinary and plenipotentiary to Cyprus, Mauritius, Tanzania and South Sudan. He also served as permanent representative to UN-Habitat.

== Early life and education ==
Rahman was born in Chittagong, Pakistan. He graduated from the University of Chittagong, earning a master's degree in sociology.

== Career ==
Rahman's diplomatic career began when he joined the Bangladesh Foreign Service in 1991. Rahman served in various diplomatic positions in Saudi Arabia, Singapore, Germany, Kenya, Tanzania, Uganda, and Egypt. He also served in senior roles in the Bangladesh Ministry of Foreign Affairs, including director general for Africa.

Rahman was a delegate on a 2010 fact-finding mission to West Africa to explore the feasibility of "contract farming" in which Bangladeshi skilled migrants and experts would work together with host countries to grow essential staple crops on unused land.

Between February 2011 and August 2014 Rahman served as the Bangladesh high commissioner to Kenya. Simultaneously, he held the role of Bangladesh's permanent representative to UN-Habitat. In 2014, Rahman was appointed the ambassador to Egypt. In 2011, he visited Bangladeshi citizens stranded in Egypt by the Libyan crisis. During his tenure as the high commissioner of Bangladesh to Kenya, Rahman's residence was attacked by armed assailants on 22 February 2014. He and his family members sustained injuries during the attack, which was reported as a robbery.

== Personal life ==
Rahman is married.
