= AFM Gousal Azam Sarker =

Bangladeshi diplomat

AFM Gousal Azam Sarker is a Bangladeshi diplomat of the 1986 batch of Bangladesh Civil Service (BCS-FA), and joined the Ministry of Foreign Affairs in 1989. He is also the former ambassador of Bangladesh to Iran, former ambassador of Bangladesh to Lebanon, and the former ambassador of Bangladesh to Sweden. He is presently the chairman of Bangladesh Institute of International and Strategic Studies.

== Personal life ==
Gousal Azam Sarker was born on 8 February 1964 as the eldest son to late Freedom Fighter Rais Uddin Sarker, a recognised veteran (Mukti Bahini) of the Bangladesh War for Liberation, 1971. He is an alumnus of the University of Dhaka where he completed his bachelor's (honours) degree in English literature, and his master's degree in English linguistics. Subsequently, he received a second master's degree in international policy & practice from George Washington University in Washington, D.C., United States.

He is married to his wife Sadia Azam and has two sons and a daughter.

== Career ==
Sarker joined the foreign affairs cadre of the Bangladesh Civil Service in 1986.

In his long diplomatic career, Sarker served in various capacities in the Ministry of Foreign Affairs including as director general (Europe) and director general (international organisations). He served in Bangladesh missions in Paris, Kathmandu, Cairo, Hong Kong, Stockholm, Beirut, and Tehran. He served as Bangladesh's consul general in Hong Kong, and ambassador to Sweden, Lebanon, and Iran with concurrent accreditation to Denmark, Norway, Iceland, Tajikistan, Armenia, and Azerbaijan.

Sarker was the director general of the Europe and international organisations wings at the Ministry of Foreign Affairs between 2008 and 2010.

In 2014, Sarker was the first ambassador of Bangladesh to Lebanon. He and the head of chancery at the embassy, ATM Monemul Haque, had filed multiple complaints against each other with the Ministry of Foreign Affairs. The Foreign Ministry recalled both men after the Foreign Ministry sent the ambassador of Bangladesh to Egypt to investigate the issue.

Sarker was appointed ambassador of Bangladesh to Sweden in September 2010 and presented his credentials to the king of Sweden, Carl XVI Gustaf, in November.

In June 2019, Sarker was appointed the ambassador of Bangladesh to Iran.

In March 2023, Manjurul Karim Khan replaced Sarker as the ambassador of Bangladesh to Iran. He was appointed chairman of Bangladesh Institute of International and Strategic Studies.
