= Manjurul Karim Khan Chowdhury =

Bangladeshi diplomat

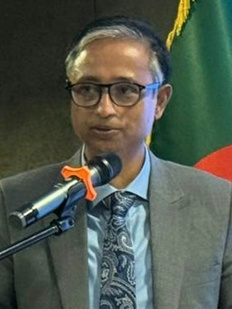
- Chowdhury in Kuala Lumpur (2025)

High Commissioner of Bangladesh to Malaysia
- Incumbent
- Assumed office 6 October 2025
- Preceded by: M. Shameem Ahsan

Ambassador of Bangladesh to Iran
- In office 8 May 2023 – 2025

Ambassador of Bangladesh to Myanmar
- In office 8 March 2018 – 30 April 2023
- Preceded by: Mohammad Sufiur Rahman
- Succeeded by: Md. Monwar Hossain

Personal details
- Born: Habiganj District
- Education: Bangladesh University of Engineering and Technology; Sapienza University of Rome

Manjurul Karim Khan Chowdhury is a Bangladeshi diplomat and the current High Commissioner of Bangladesh to Malaysia since October 2025. He is a former ambassador of Bangladesh to Iran and Myanmar. He is the former Ambassador of Bangladesh to Myanmar.

== Early life ==
Manjurul Karim Khan Chowdhury was born in Habiganj District. He completed his undergraduate from Bangladesh University of Engineering and Technology in Mechanical Engineering.

Chowdhury did his Master's in Geopolitics and Global Security at the Sapienza University of Rome. He also studied Italian language and culture at the Università per stranieri di Perugia, Italy and participated in an International Law course at the University La Sapienza.

Chowdhury did a Chevening Fellowship on Peacekeeping and International Capacity Building at the University of Bradford, United Kingdom.

== Career ==
In 1998, Chowdhury joined the Foreign Affairs Cadre of the 17th batch of the Bangladesh Civil Service.

A career Foreign Service Officer, Chowdhury began his diplomatic career by serving as the First Secretary at the Bangladesh High Commission in Brunei Darussalam.

He then served as Consular at the Bangladesh Embassy in Rome, Italy.

After his post in Italy, Chowdhury was appointed as the Director of the Europe and EU wing at the Ministry of Foreign Affairs.

Following his post as the Director of the Europe and EU wing, Chowdhury served as the Minister Counsellor at the Bangladesh High Commission in London, United Kingdom.

From December 2012 to July 2015, Chowdhury served as Bangladesh's first Consul General at the Bangladesh Consulate in Istanbul, Turkey.

From August 2015 to February 2018, Chowdhury served as the Director General of South East Asia Wing of the Ministry of Foreign Affairs.

In February 2018, he was appointed the Ambassador of Bangladesh to Myanmar. In September 2022, the government of Myanmar told Chowdhury that the Arakan Rohingya Salvation Army and Arakan Army were to blame for artillery shells from Myanmar falling in the territory of Bangladesh.

In March 2023, Chowdhury was appointed the Ambassador of Bangladesh to Iran replacing AFM Gousal Azam Sarker.

== Personal life ==
Chowdhury is married to Farzana Nasrin. He has two children, a daughter and a son. His son's name is Arham Farabi Chowdhury.
