= A. T. M. Rokebul Haque =

Bangladeshi diplomat

- এ. টি. এম. রকিবুল হক

Ambassador of Bangladesh to Italy, Serbia and Montenegro
- President: Mohammed Shahabuddin
- Prime Minister: Tarique Rahman
- Preceded by: Md. Monirul Islam

Personal details
- Education: University of Dhaka

A. T. M. Rokebul Haque is the ambassador of Bangladesh to Italy. He is a career diplomat and has extensive experience in multilateral, regional, and bilateral diplomacy. Haque assumed office on 2 October 2024, succeeding Ambassador Md Monirul Islam.

Haque is concurrently accredited as ambassador of Bangladesh to Serbia and Montenegro. He is also the permanent representative to the Rome-based UN agencies i.e., Food and Agriculture Organization (FAO), the International Fund for Agricultural Development (IFAD), and the World Food Programme (WFP).

== Education ==
Haque did his bachelor's and master's in economics at the University of Dhaka.

== Career ==
Haque joined the foreign service through the 20th batch of the Bangladesh Civil Service in 2001.

Prior to joining as ambassador in Rome, he served as director general and head of the South Asia Wing in the Ministry of Foreign Affairs. He spearheaded key diplomatic engagements and successfully conducted a number of VVIP visits. He represented Bangladesh in various bilateral meetings and led Bangladesh delegations in many negotiations and meetings.

In the ministry, he organized and facilitated the 6th Indian Ocean Conference in Dhaka in 2023. He was Foreign Office Track for Bangladesh's participation as a "Guest Country" at the 'G20' under India's presidency in 2023.

In his diplomatic career, he had served in various positions, including deputy high commissioner in New Delhi, India and then he was in charge of coordinating with all non-resident diplomatic missions concurrently accredited to Bangladesh (around 80 missions), based in New Delhi.

Prior to this, Haque served as minister at the Permanent Mission of Bangladesh to the United Nations in New York. In the United Nations, he covered key portfolios such as gender equality, human rights, and social issues, including health, youth, and children welfare. He successfully chaired and facilitated the adoption of Bangladesh's signature resolution on the "Culture of Peace." He was the election officer during his stint in the Permanent Mission.

He also served in Bangladesh Missions in The Hague and Islamabad. In The Hague, he covered the ICJ, ICC and OPCW.

At the ministry, Haque served in different capacities in Administration, South Asia and Americas desks. He was also director to the Foreign Secretary's Office (FSO).
