= Kazi Sharif Kaikobad =

Bengali major general

High Commissioner of Bangladesh to Nigeria
- In office 15 February 2017 – 31 January 2018
- Preceded by: Position created
- Succeeded by: M. Shameem Ahsan

Personal details
- Born: 31 December 1964 (age 61) Maijdee, East Pakistan, Pakistan
- Military career
- Branch: Bangladesh Army; Bangladesh Ansar
- Service years: 1984–2020
- Rank: Major General
- Unit: Regiment of Artillery
- Commands: Director General of Bangladesh Ansar and Village Defence Party; Managing Director of Bangladesh Machine Tools Factory Limited; Commander of Logistics Area; Commander of 55th Artillery Brigade; Commander of 9th Artillery Brigade
- Conflicts: UNMEE, UNMIBH

Kazi Sharif Kaikobad (born 31 December 1964) is a former major general in the Bangladesh Army. He is the former director general of the Bangladesh Ansar and the Village Defence Party.

== Career ==
Kaikobad was commissioned in the Bangladesh Army on December 21, 1984, in the Corps of Artillery with the 11th BMA long course. He was the first resident high commissioner to Nigeria. Previously, he was assigned as managing director, Bangladesh Machine Tools Factory Limited. He also served as senior directing staff of the National Defence College, Mirpur. He was an instructor at the Bangladesh Military Academy and Artillery Centre & School. He commanded three BGB battalions, two artillery regiments, and two artillery brigades (9 artillery brigade and 55 artillery brigade). He was deployed in the United Nations Mission in Bosnia & Herzegovina and the United Nations Mission in Ethiopia and Eritrea.

He graduated from the University of Chittagong. He is a graduate of Defence Services Command and Staff College, Mirpur, and also completed the National Defence Course at the National Defence College, Mirpur.

Kaikobad was appointed the first resident high commissioner to Nigeria from Bangladesh.
