= M Amanul Haq =

Bangladeshi diplomat

M. Amanul Haq

Bangladesh Ambassador to Turkey
- Incumbent
- Assumed office 18 February 2023
- President: Mohammad Abdul Hamid; Mohammed Shahabuddin
- Prime Minister: Sheikh Hasina; Muhammad Yunus (as Chief Adviser); Tarique Rahman
- Preceded by: Mosud Mannan

Personal details
- Education: University of Dhaka
- Profession: Diplomat

M. Amanul Haq is a Bangladeshi career diplomat currently serving as the Ambassador of Bangladesh to the Republic of Türkiye. He is the former Chief of Protocol of the Ministry of Foreign Affairs.

== Early life and education ==
Haq completed both his Honours and Master's degrees in International Relations from the University of Dhaka. He also earned a diploma in International Relations from École nationale d'administration in France.

== Career ==
Haq joined the 18th batch of the Bangladesh Civil Service (Foreign Affairs cadre) in 1999. He began his diplomatic career abroad as Consul and Deputy Head of Mission at the Bangladesh Consulate General in New York. He was seconded to the Headquarters of the Organisation of Islamic Cooperation in Jeddah, Saudi Arabia, where he served in various roles and went on to become the Acting Director General of the Cabinet and Advisor to the Secretary-General.

Upon returning to Bangladesh, Haq served in several senior positions at the Ministry of Foreign Affairs. These included the Director General for West Asia, the Director General for International Organisations, and the Director General for the Bangabandhu Birth Centenary and Golden Jubilee of Bangladesh’s Independence Celebration Cell. He also led the Ministry's Coronavirus Cell during the COVID-19 pandemic in Bangladesh. From 2020 until his ambassadorial appointment in 2023, he held the position of Chief of Protocol.

On 18 February 2023, he assumed the post of Ambassador of Bangladesh to Türkiye. He replaced Mosud Mannan.

== Personal life ==
Haq is married and has two daughters.
