= Embassy of Algeria, Warsaw =

Diplomatic mission of Algeria in Poland

Embassy of Algeria in Warsaw
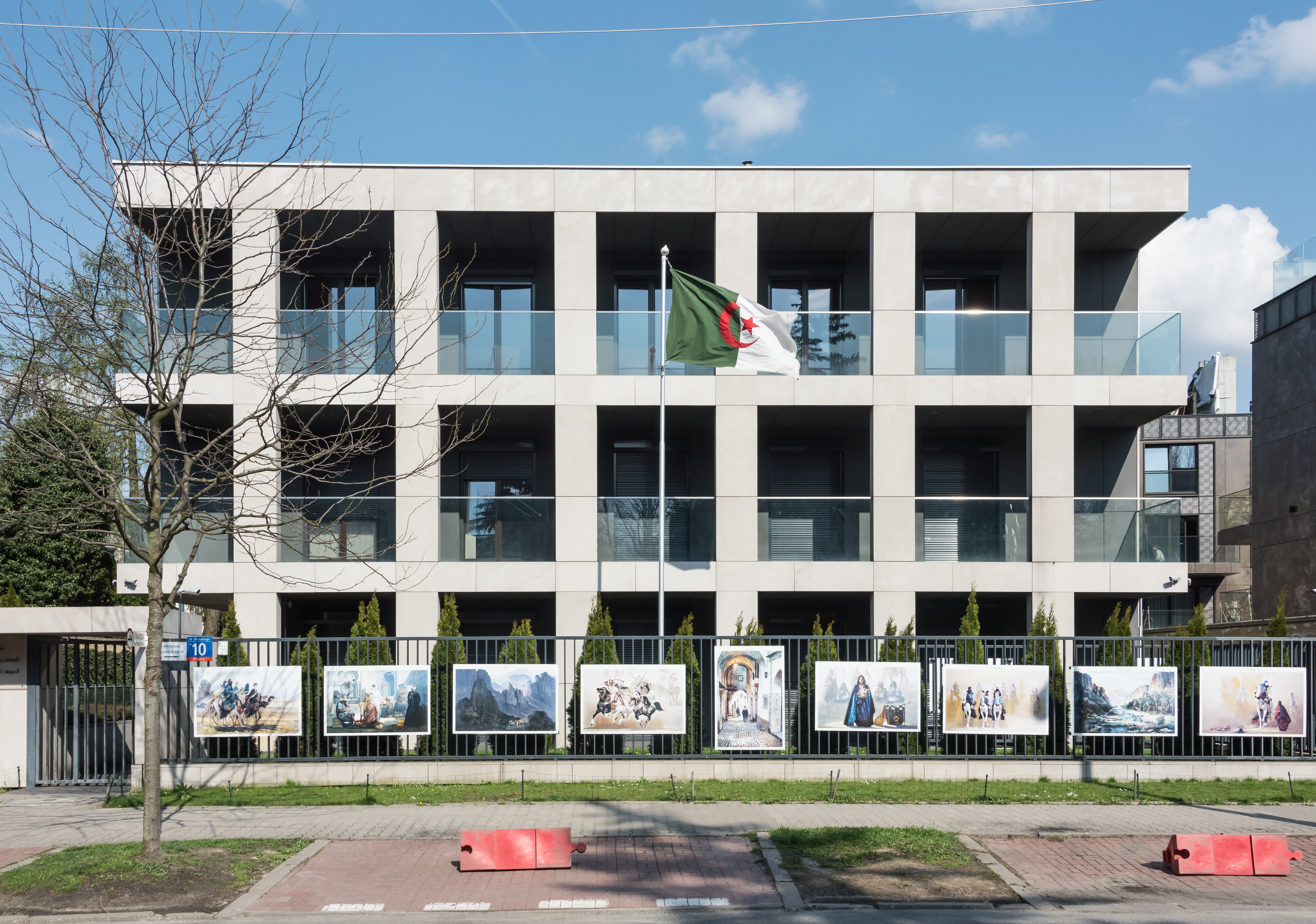
- The building of the embassy of Alegria, located in Warsaw, Poland, at 10 Krasickiego Street, in 2021.
- Location: Warsaw, Poland
- Address: 10 Krasickiego Street
- Coordinates: 52°11′27.72″N 21°01′18.16″E
- Opened: 1971
- Relocated: 2016
- Ambassador: Salem Ait Chabane
- Website: algerianembassy.pl

The Embassy of Algeria in Warsaw (Note: Polish: Ambasada Algierii w Warszawie; Arabic: سفارة الجزائر في بولندا, transcription: Sifarat Aljazayir fi Bulanda) is the diplomatic mission of Algeria in Poland. The embassy is located in the city of Warsaw, Poland, at 10 Krasickiego Street. The current ambassador of Algeria to Poland is Salem Ait Chabane.

The ambassador of Algeria to Poland also holds a non-resident accreditation to Estonia, Latvia, and Lithuania.

== History ==
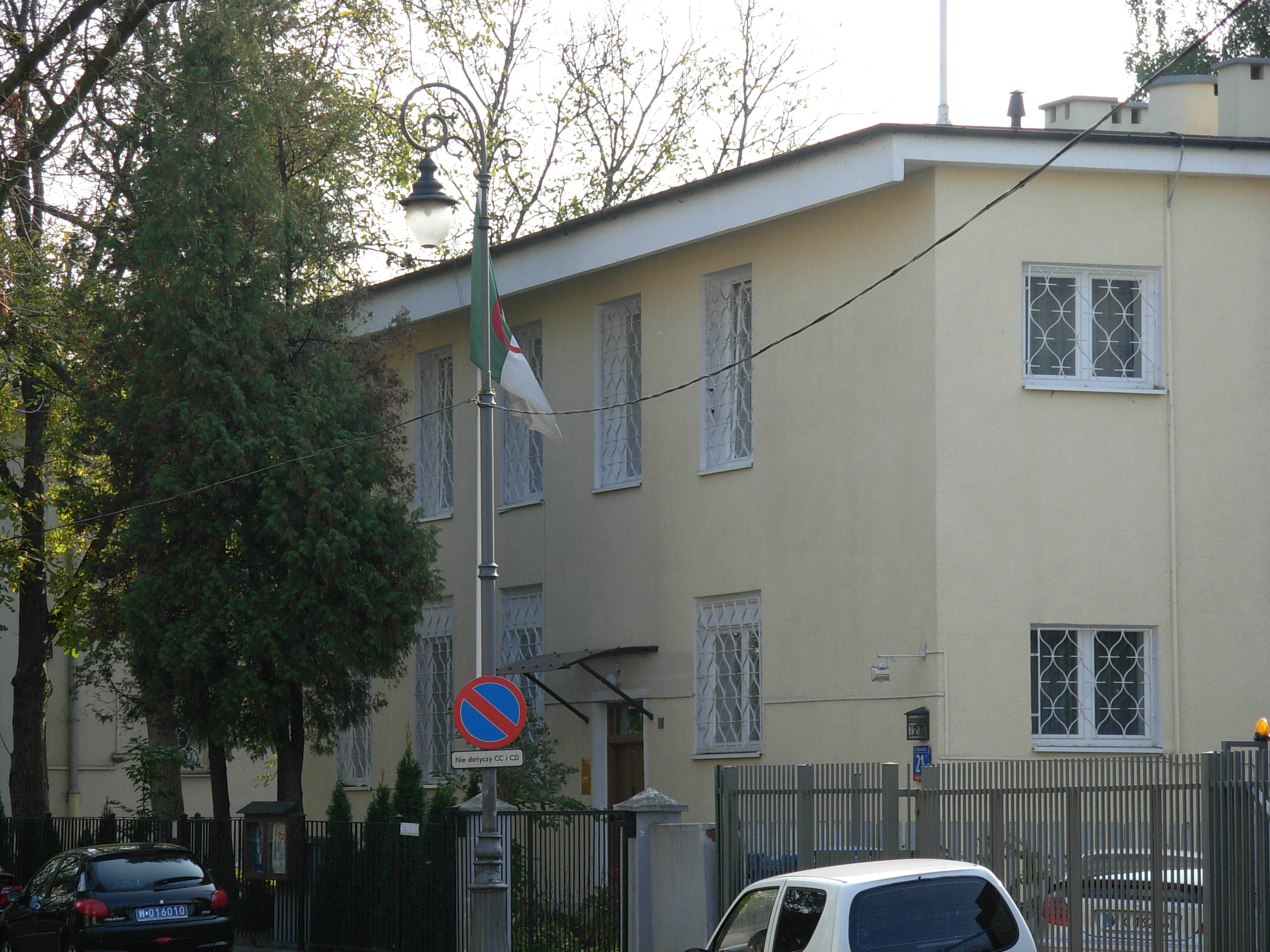
The building which housed the embassy of Algeria from 1972 to 2016, located at 21 Dąbrowiecka Street. Photography made in 2007.

The international relations between Algeria and Poland had been established in 1962. From 1962 to 1971, the ambassador of Algeria to Czechoslovakia had the non-resident accreditation to Poland, with the embassy located in Prague. In 1971, the embassy in Poland was established in Warsaw. It was originally set in the building of Hotel Europejski, at 13 Krakowskie Przedmieście Street. Later that year, it was moved to villa, which was built in 1930, located at 5 Willowa Street. From 1972 to 2016, the embassy building was located at 21 Dąbrowiecka Street. In April 2016, it was moved to the building at 10 Krasickiego Street, which previously, from 1996 to 2004, housed the embassy of Croatia. The embassy remains there to the present day.
