= Bangladeshis in Poland =

Xinhua News reported that in 2007 Polish government approved the arrival of about 200 skilled and semi-skilled workers from Bangladesh, and Bangladesh repeated such offers later. The numbers of legal Bangladeshi residents in Poland were: 139 (2010), 1,221 (2018), 1,533 (2019), 2,633 (2022).

== See also ==
- Bangladeshi diaspora
- Immigration to Poland
- Ethnic minorities in Poland
- Bangladesh–Poland relations
