= Embassy of New Zealand, Warsaw =

Diplomatic mission of New Zealand in Poland

Embassy of New Zealand in Warsaw
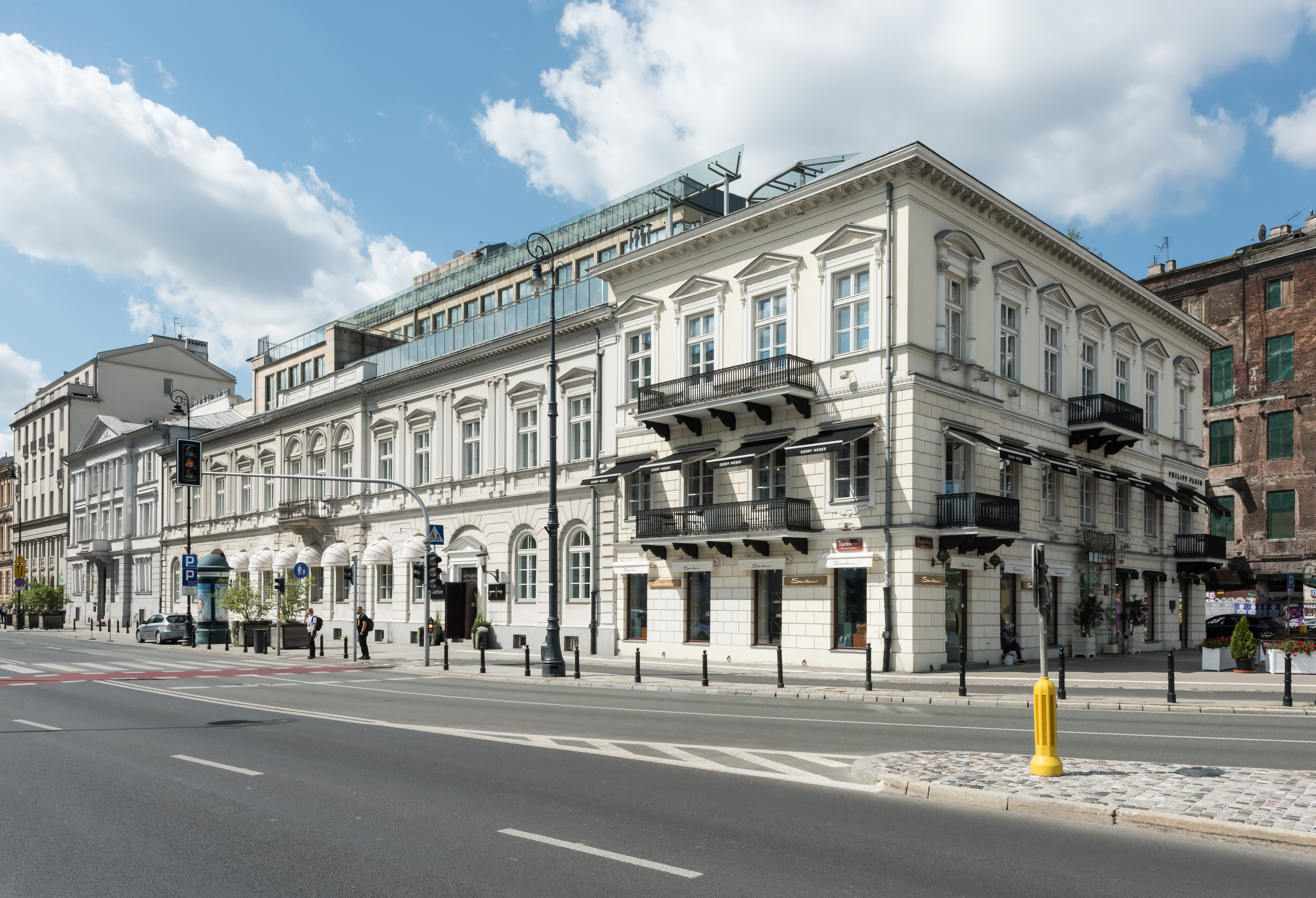
- Dom Dochodowy building in Warsaw, Poland, which houses the embassy of New Zealand.
- Location: Warsaw, Poland
- Address: 51 Ujazdów Avenue
- Coordinates: 52°13′38.75″N 21°01′22.20″E
- Opened: 2005
- Ambassador: Chargé d'affaires Tom Fitzsimons
- Website: mfat.govt.nz

The Embassy of New Zealand in Warsaw (Note: Polish: Ambasada Nowej Zelandii w Warszawie; Māori: Te Aka Aorere Pōrana) is the diplomatic mission of New Zealand in Poland. The embassy is located in the city of Warsaw, Poland, at 51 Ujazdów Avenue. The current ambassador of New Zealand to Poland is Chargé d'affaires Tom Fitzsimons. From 2021 to 2024 the Embassy was headed by Alana Hudson.

The ambassadors of New Zealand to Poland also holds a non-resident accreditation to Estonia, Georgia, Latvia, Lithuania, and Ukraine.

The embassy is aided by the New Zealand Trade and Enterprise, which has its headquarters in Hamburg, Germany.

== History ==
The international relations between New Zealand and Poland had been established in 1973. From 1973 to 2004, the ambassador of New Zealand to Poland, was non-resident. From 1973 to 1975, such office was held by the ambassador to West Germany, with their headquarters being the embassy in Bonn, West Germany, at Friedrich-Wilhelm-Straße 18. From 1978 to 1992, the office was held by the ambassador to Austria, with their headquarters being the embassy in Vienna, Austria, at Lugeck 1. From 1992 to 1990, the ambassador to West Germany, again held the dual accreditation as the non-resident ambassador to Poland. In 1990, West Germany and East Germany, had unified forming the Federal Republic of Germany, whose ambassador continued to be non-resident ambassador to Poland until 2004. Since 1990, their embassy was located in Berlin, Germany, at 60 Friedrich Street.

In 2005, the embassy of New Zealand was opened in Warsaw, Poland, in Dom Dochodowy building, located at 51 Ujazdów Avenue.

== See also ==
- List of ambassadors of New Zealand to Poland
- New Zealand–Poland relations
