= Md. Monwar Hossain =

Bangladeshi diplomat (born 1970)

- মোঃ মনোয়ার হোসেন
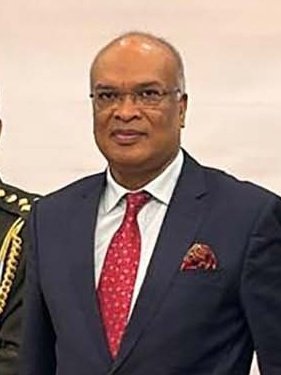
- Hossain in Yangon, Myanmar (2025)

Ambassador of Bangladesh to Myanmar
- In office 31 July 2023 – 28 May 2025
- Preceded by: Manjurul Karim Khan Chowdhury
- Succeeded by: Vacant

Personal details
- Born: 10 March 1970 (age 56) Bangladesh
- Spouse: Ayesha Haq
- Children: 1
- Education: Chittagong Medical College; London School of Economics; London School of Hygiene and Tropical Medicine; Nanyang Technological University
- Occupation: Diplomat, physician

Md. Monwar Hossain (born 10 March 1970) is a Bangladeshi diplomat and a former Ambassador of Bangladesh to Myanmar. He was recalled following rising tensions between the two neighbours.

== Early life and education ==
Hossain was born on 10 March 1970. He completed his MBBS at Chittagong Medical College. He later finished a Master of Science in Health Economics from the London School of Economics and a Diploma in Health Policy, Planning and Financing from the London School of Hygiene and Tropical Medicine. He holds a Doctor of Philosophy in Public Health Communication from Nanyang Technological University in Singapore. Over the years, He received specialized training from institutions such as the Asia-Europe Foundation, Diplo Foundation, University of Geneva, Harvard Law School, and Tufts University.

== Career ==
Hossain ranked first in the 20th Bangladesh Civil Service examination following which he joined the Foreign Service in 2001. He briefly served in the 18th Bangladesh Civil Service (Health) cadre. He was awarded the Rector Medal during his foundation training and received the Chancellor’s Award from the President of Bangladesh for outstanding academic performance.

Hossain served in Bangladesh's embassies in Washington, D.C. and Singapore in various roles, promoting economic diplomacy, health cooperation, and diaspora engagement. In Washington, he pioneered the monthly online publication *Vibrant Bangladesh*, and in Singapore, he worked on trade relations and regional outreach. From August 2006 to May 2008, he was the Second Secretary/ First Secretary at the Bangladesh Embassy in the United States. Between 2015 and 2018, He served as Director and later Director General of the South Asia Wing at the Ministry of Foreign Affairs. He was instrumental in implementing the Land Boundary Agreement with India and in initiating new bilateral mechanisms, including the first consular dialogue with India.

Hossain served as the Deputy Permanent Representative of Bangladesh to the United Nations in New York from November 2020 to mid-2023. As DPR, he coordinated Bangladesh’s engagement in the UN General Assembly and Security Council, and oversaw delegation activities across committees. During the COVID-19 pandemic, he served as the Mission’s focal point, leading strategic responses on global health and socio-economic issues.

In 2021, Hossain facilitated the first-ever resolutions on “Vision for Everyone: Accelerating Action to Achieve the SDGs” and “Global Drowning Prevention.” In May 2023, he led the adoption of another resolution titled “Community-Based Primary Health Care,”. In January 2023, Hossain was appointed as the Ambassador of Bangladesh to Myanmar and took charge at the Bangladesh Embassy in Yangon in July 2023. He succeeded Manjurul Karim Khan as ambassador.

Bangladesh recalled Hossain, but interim leader Muhammad Yunus denied any diplomatic dispute. He said the ambassador’s return was not due to being declared persona non grata by Myanmar. The recall took place after the junta expelled its military attaché, Brigadier General Aftab Hossain. Dhaka maintains communication with the Arakan Army and plans a UN-backed aid corridor to Rakhine despite rising tensions.

== Personal life ==
Hossain is married to Ayesha Haq. The couple has one son. Outside his professional life, he is known for his dedication to public service, international cooperation, and advancing Bangladesh’s profile in global health and development diplomacy.
