= Embassy of Bangladesh, The Hague =

- Address: Stadhouderslaan 7, 2517 The Hague, Netherlands
- Coordinates: 52°05′09″N 4°16′56″E
- Opened: 1995
- Ambassador: Tareque Muhammad
- Jurisdiction: Netherlands, Bosnia and Herzegovina, Croatia
- Website: Embassy, The Hague

The Embassy of Bangladesh, The Hague is a diplomatic mission of Bangladesh located in Netherlands. It is headed by the ambassador of Bangladesh to Netherlands.

== History ==
Bangladesh established its full diplomatic relationship with Netherlands in 1972. Since then until 1995 Bangladesh maintained its relationship through the Bangladesh Embassy at Bonn. In 1995 Bangladesh opened an embassy at The Hague. And Bosnia and Herzegovina and Croatia are accredited to the mission.
