= Muhammad Mahfuzur Rahman (diplomat) =

Bangladeshi diplomat

- মুহাম্মদ মাহফুজুর রহমান
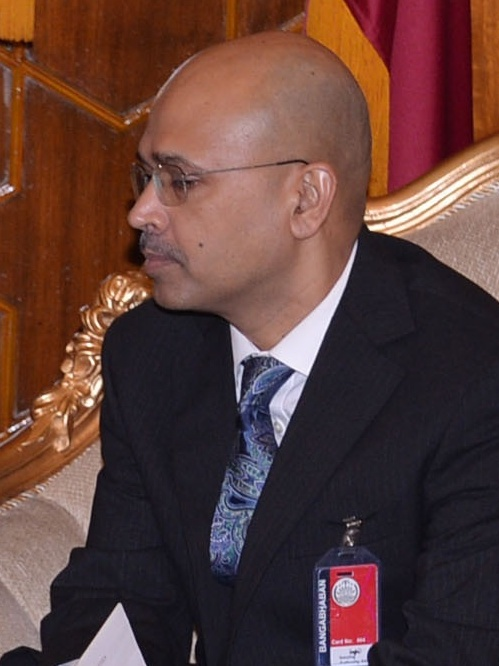
- Rahman in 2015

Ambassador of Bangladesh to Poland
- In office 25 December 2014 – 23 October 2020
- Succeeded by: Sultana Laila Hossain

Personal details
- Education: Bangladesh University of Engineering and Technology; Monash University

Muhammad Mahfuzur Rahman is a Bangladeshi diplomat and former ambassador of Bangladesh to Poland and Ukraine.

== Early life ==
Rahman completed his bachelor's degree in architecture from the Bangladesh University of Engineering and Technology. He did his master's degree at Monash University in Foreign Affairs and International Trade.

== Career ==
Rahman joined the Bangladesh Foreign Service through the 13th batch of Bangladesh Civil Service. He served in the embassies of Bangladesh in Myanmar, Kuwait, and Spain, as well as in the High Commission of Bangladesh in Pakistan.

Rahman was the director general of the American Desk at the Ministry of Foreign Affairs from September 2012 to June 2015.

On 25 December 2014, Rahman was appointed ambassador of Bangladesh to Poland. On 23 June 2015, he presented his credentials to President Bronislaw Komorowski of Poland. He concurrently served as the ambassador of Bangladesh to Ukraine. He urged Grzegorz Schetyna, Minister of Foreign Affairs of Poland to make it easier for Bangladeshi students to get study visas. In January 2019, he signed a memorandum of understanding with Jagiellonian University to establish the Bangabandhu Centre for Bangladesh Studies.

Rahman wrote for the Daily Sun that President Mohammed Shahabuddin should be forcefully removed from power for being appointed by the deposed Sheikh Hasina led Awami League government. He said "this clown (Mohammed Shahabuddin) should be removed".

== Personal life ==
Rahman is married to Shahnaj Parvin. They have three children.
