= Mizanur Rahman (diplomat) =

Bangladeshi diplomat

Ambassador of Bangladesh to Egypt
- In office 22 July 2010 – 19 July 2014
- Preceded by: Ashraf Uddin
- Succeeded by: M. Wahidur Rahman

Ambassador of Bangladesh to the Netherlands
- In office 15 March 2008 – 14 July 2010
- Preceded by: Ismat Jahan
- Succeeded by: Muhammad Ali Sorcar

Personal details
- Spouse: Nishat Rahman
- Education: University of Dhaka

Mizanur Rahman is a diplomat and the Bangladeshi ambassador to Oman. He is a former Bangladeshi high commissioner to Canada and ambassador of Bangladesh to Egypt and the Netherlands.

== Early life ==
Mizanur Rahman graduated from the University of Dhaka after graduate studies in physics.

== Career ==
Rahman joined the Bangladesh Foreign Service in 1985.

Rahman had served as the director general (multilateral economic affairs) at the Ministry of Foreign Affairs. He also worked as the director general (administration) at the ministry. He later worked as the secretary of the bi-lateral and consular section at the Ministry of Foreign Affairs.

In 2008, Rahman was the ambassador of Bangladesh to the Netherlands.

On 7 January 2010, Rahman was appointed the ambassador of Bangladesh to Egypt.

Rahman was promoted to full secretary in September 2015. On 2 November 2015, Mizanur Rahman was appointed high commissioner of Bangladesh to Canada. He was also accredited as the high commissioner of Bangladesh to Jamaica. In 2019, he attended the inauguration of the Bangladeshi Consulate General in Toronto.

On 25 September 2020, Rahman was appointed the ambassador of Bangladesh to Oman. He was the chief guest at the reception accorded to leaders of NRB CIP Association, expatriate businessmen, in Oman. He organized a webinar between Oman Chamber of Commerce & Industry and the Federation of Bangladesh Chambers of Commerce & Industry in an effort to boost trade between the two countries.

== Personal life ==
Mizanur Rahman is married to Nishat Rahman.
