= Muhammad Ali Sorcar =

Bangladeshi diplomat

- মুহাম্মদ আলী সরকার

Ambassador of Bangladesh to Egypt
- In office 22 February 2017 – 12 November 2019
- Preceded by: M. Wahidur Rahman
- Succeeded by: Md. Monirul Islam

Ambassador of Bangladesh to Germany
- Incumbent
- Assumed office 2013
- Preceded by: Mosud Mannan

Ambassador of Bangladesh to The Netherlands
- In office 21 October 2010 – 19 October 2013
- Preceded by: Mizanur Rahman
- Succeeded by: Sheikh Mohammed Belal

Personal details
- Education: Mymensingh Medical College; Tufts University

Muhammad Ali Sorcar is a Bangladeshi diplomat. He is a former ambassador of Bangladesh to Egypt, Germany, and the Netherlands.

== Education ==
Muhammad Ali Sorcar earned his MBBS degree from Mymensingh Medical College and a master's degree from the Fletcher School of Law and Diplomacy from the Tufts University in Massachusetts, United States.

== Career ==
Sorcar belonged to 1986 batch of Bangladesh Civil Service (Foreign Affairs) Cadre.

Sorcar served as Deputy Permanent Representative of Bangladesh to UN in New York and Bangladesh Embassy in Brussels.
