= New Zealand–Poland relations =

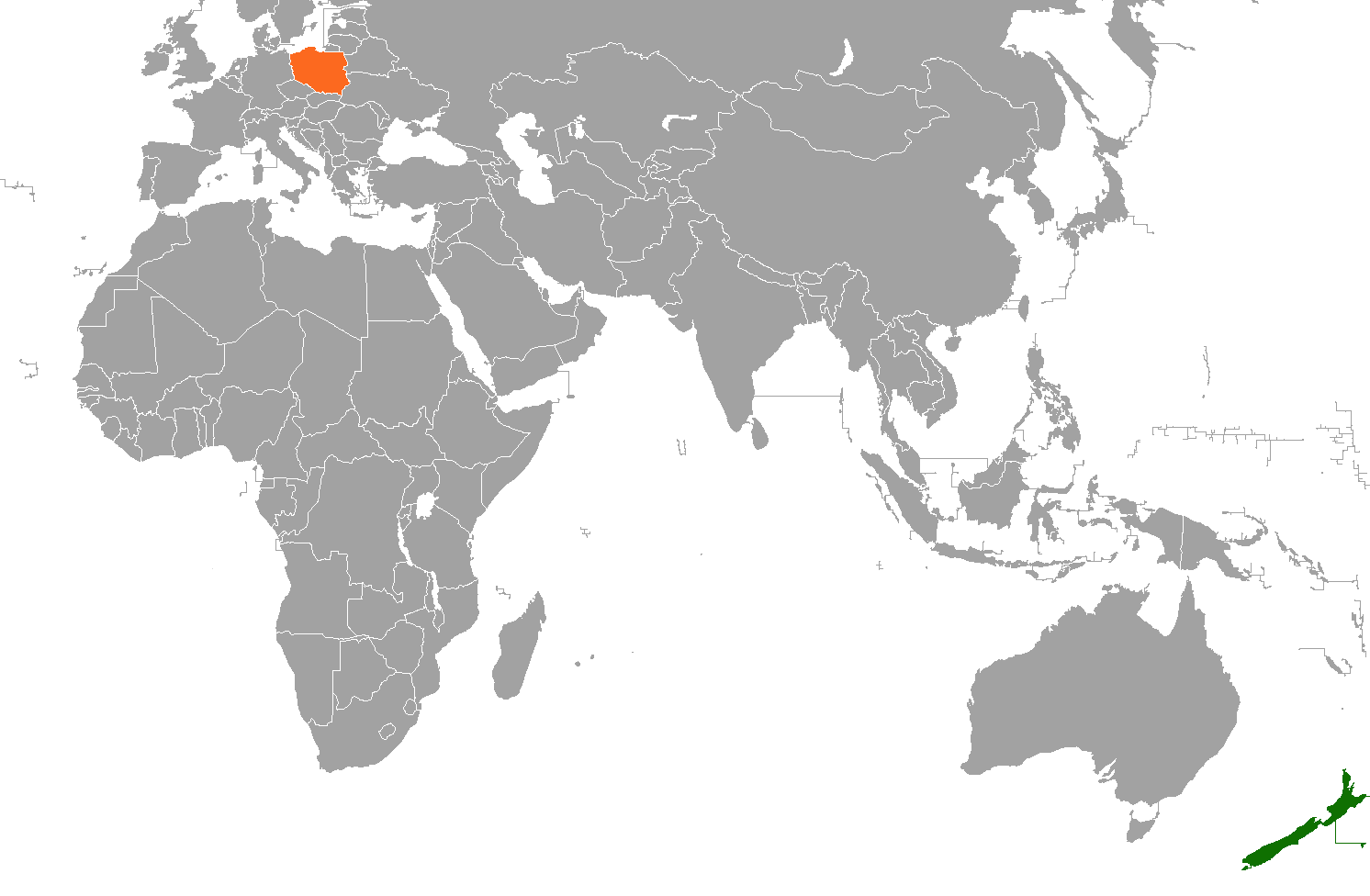

- New Zealand: Poland

New Zealand–Poland relations are the bilateral relations between New Zealand and Poland. New Zealand has an embassy in Warsaw, while Poland has an embassy in Wellington. Both nations are members of the Australia Group, and the Organisation for Economic Co-operation and Development.

== History ==
=== Early contact and migration ===
The first two subjects of Poland to arrive to New Zealand accompanied Captain James Cook on his second voyage to the Pacific in 1772. Throughout the 19th century, few Polish migrants began settling in New Zealand escaping foreign occupation, with its consequences, of their partitioned country. Many of these early pioneers worked in occupations requiring little English, felling bush, draining swamps and building tracks. Eventually acquiring their own land, they turned to farming.

=== Indirect relations and refugee resettlement ===
In 1918, Poland regained independence, and in the 1930s, diplomatic relations between New Zealand and Poland were conducted via-London when New Zealand was a Dominion. Poland maintained a consulate in Wellington.

Memorial to the victims of the German-perpetrated Stalag Luft III murders, including Poles and New Zealanders, in Żagań, Poland

New Zealand declared war on Germany on 3 September 1939, the third day of the German invasion of Poland, which started World War II, and was one of the first countries to do so. New Zealand soldiers fought alongside their Polish counterparts during the Battle of Britain and the Battle of Monte Cassino in Italy. New Zealand prisoners of war were among Allied POWs held in German POW camps operated in German-occupied Poland. In Żagań, Poland, there is a memorial to the victims of the German-perpetrated Stalag Luft III murders, including Poles and New Zealanders.

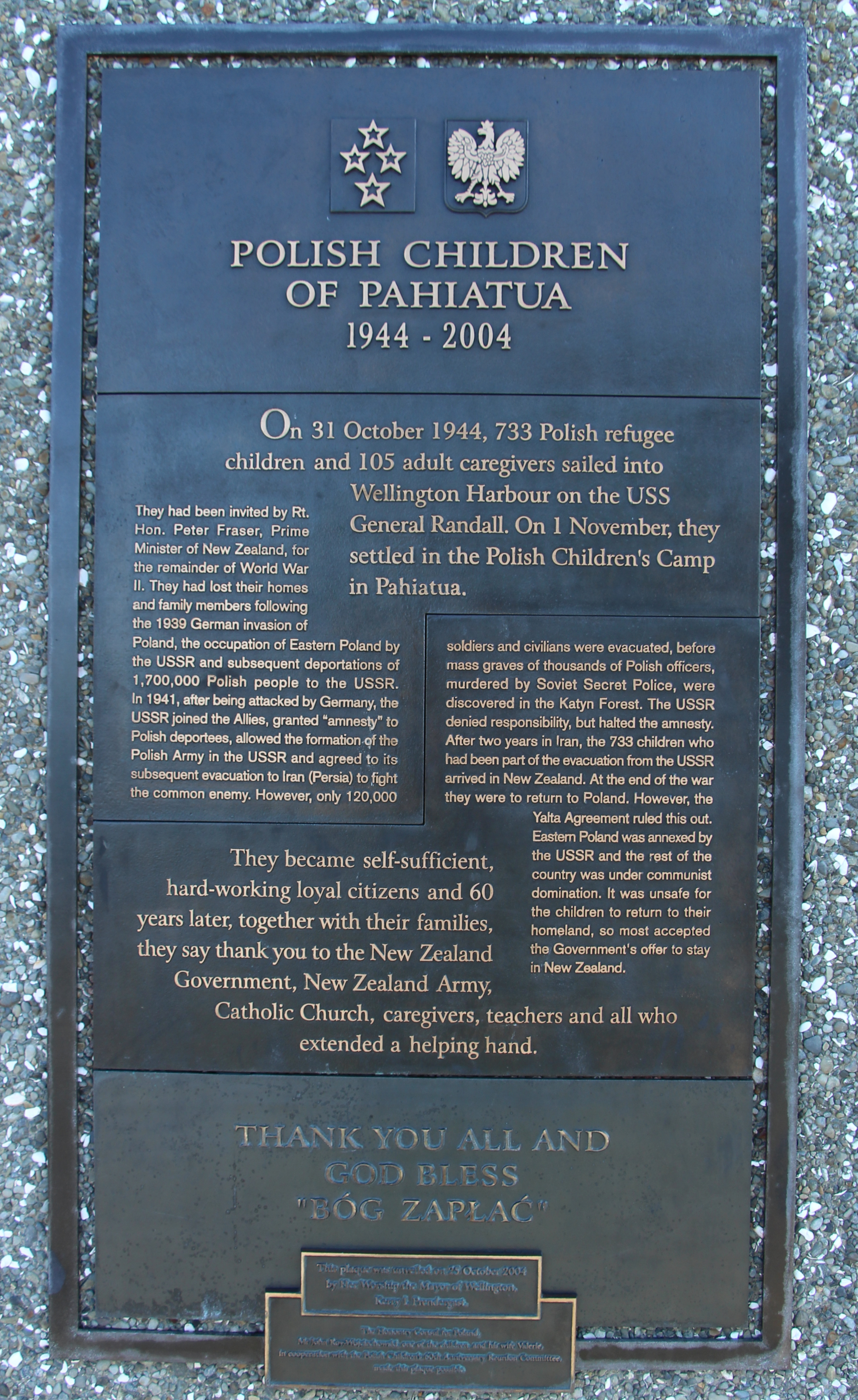
Memorial to the Polish Children of Pahiatua

In 1944, over 730 Polish children (mainly orphans) and 105 adults were settled in New Zealand. The refugees had survived deportation from Soviet-occupied eastern Poland to the Soviet Union, including Siberia, and escaped to New Zealand via Persia (today known as Iran) and settled in the town of Pahiatua on the North Island of New Zealand. New Zealand was the most distant place from Poland in which Polish refugees ended up during World War II. The refugee camp for Polish children in Pahiatua existed until 1949, and it had a Polish elementary school (until 1949) and a secondary school (until 1946). At the end of the war, more than 200 former soldiers and 700 displaced people from Poland were resettled to New Zealand.

=== Formal relations, 1973–present ===
On 1 March 1973, New Zealand and Poland formally established diplomatic relations. Initially, relations between the two nations were limited during the Cold War. In 2004, Poland joined the European Union and opened an embassy in Wellington.

In April 2005, New Zealand Prime Minister Helen Clark paid an official visit to Poland and opened the New Zealand embassy in Warsaw. She is the only Prime Minister of New Zealand to visit the country. In May 2008, a Working holiday visa scheme agreement was signed between both nations.

In March 2013, both nations celebrated 40 years of diplomatic relations. Polish Foreign Minister Radosław Sikorski paid a visit to New Zealand to commemorate the establishment of diplomatic relations.

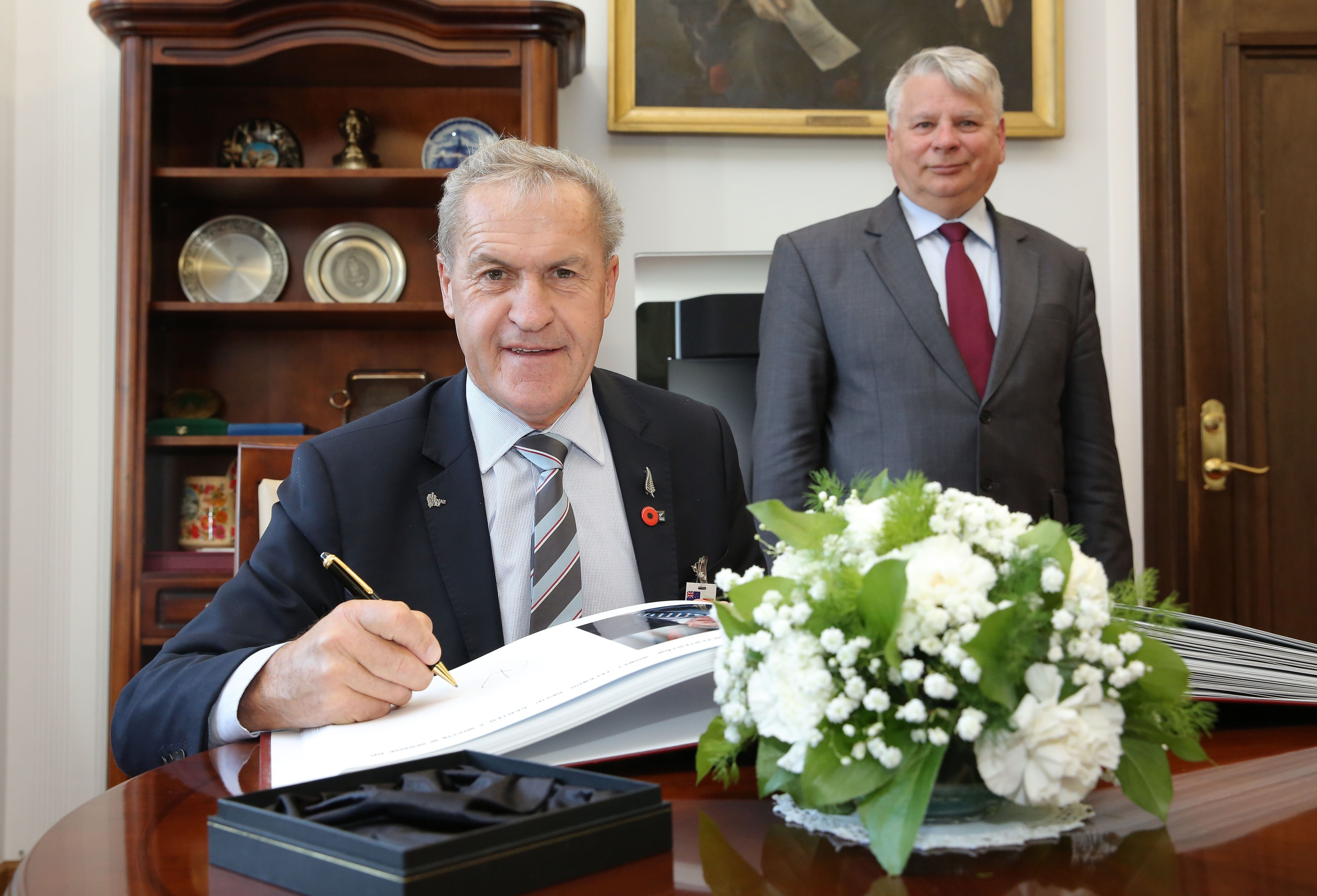
Speaker of the New Zealand House of Representatives David Carter in the Senate of Poland in 2015

In early September 2025, New Zealand Defence Minister Judith Collins visited Poland as part of a tour of Europe to strengthen New Zealand's defence and security relations with its European partners. In Warsaw, she met several senior Polish officials including Deputy Foreign Minister Władysław Teofil Bartoszewski and Deputy Prime Minister and Minister of National Defence Władysław Kosiniak-Kamysz. Collins also laid a wreath at the Tomb of the Unknown Soldier.

== Trade ==
In 2018, total trade between both nations amounted to US$270 million. New Zealand's main exports to Poland include: fish fillets, wool, iron and steel structures and their parts. Poland's main exports to New Zealand include: trucks and vans, harvesting machinery, telephones and mobile phones. In April 2005, a double taxation agreement was signed between both nations.

In July 2023, New Zealand signed a free trade agreement with the European Union. As a European Union member state, Poland became a party to the NZ-EU free trade agreement.

== Resident diplomatic missions ==
- New Zealand has an embassy in Warsaw.
- Poland has an embassy in Wellington.
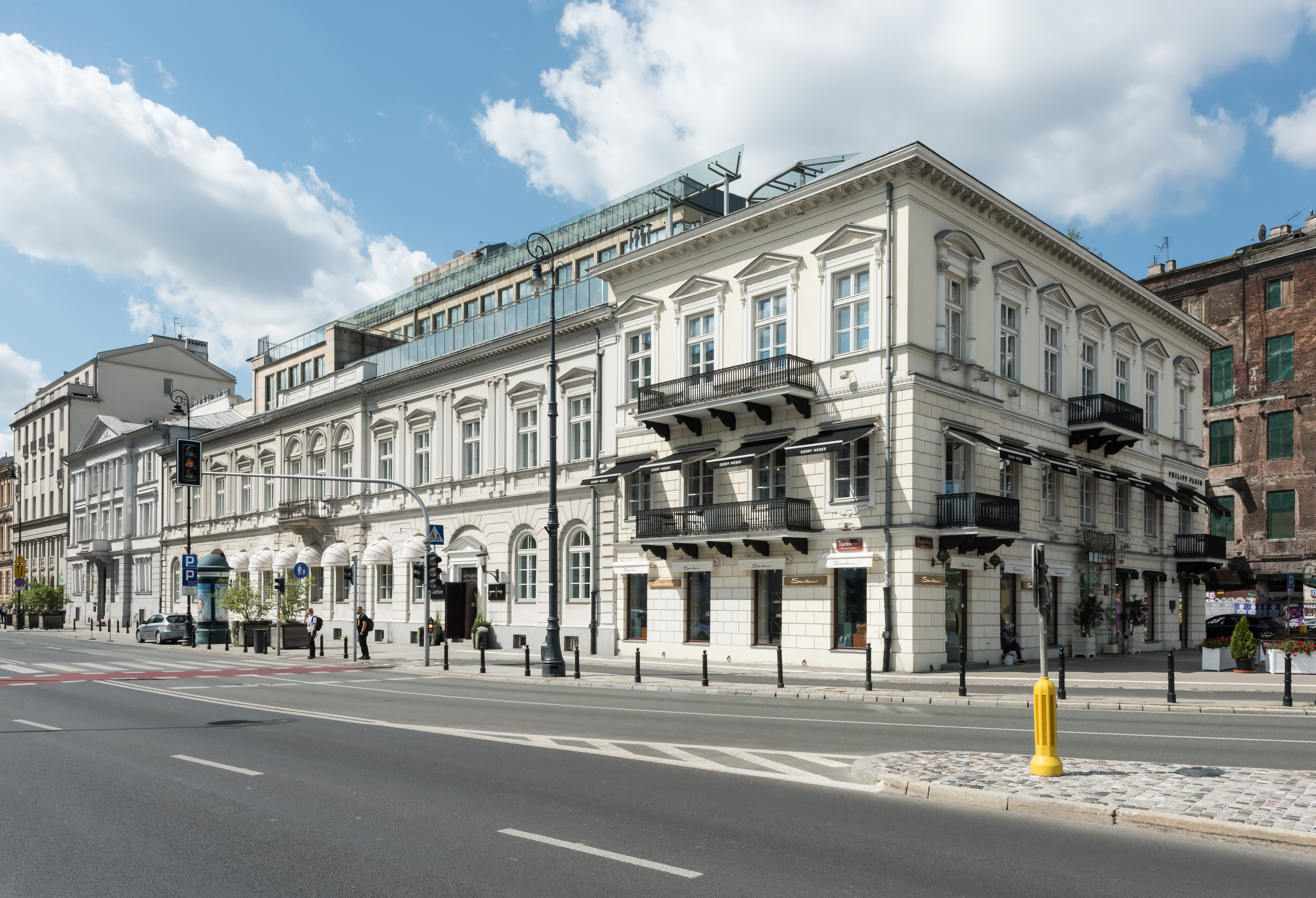
Embassy of New Zealand in Warsaw

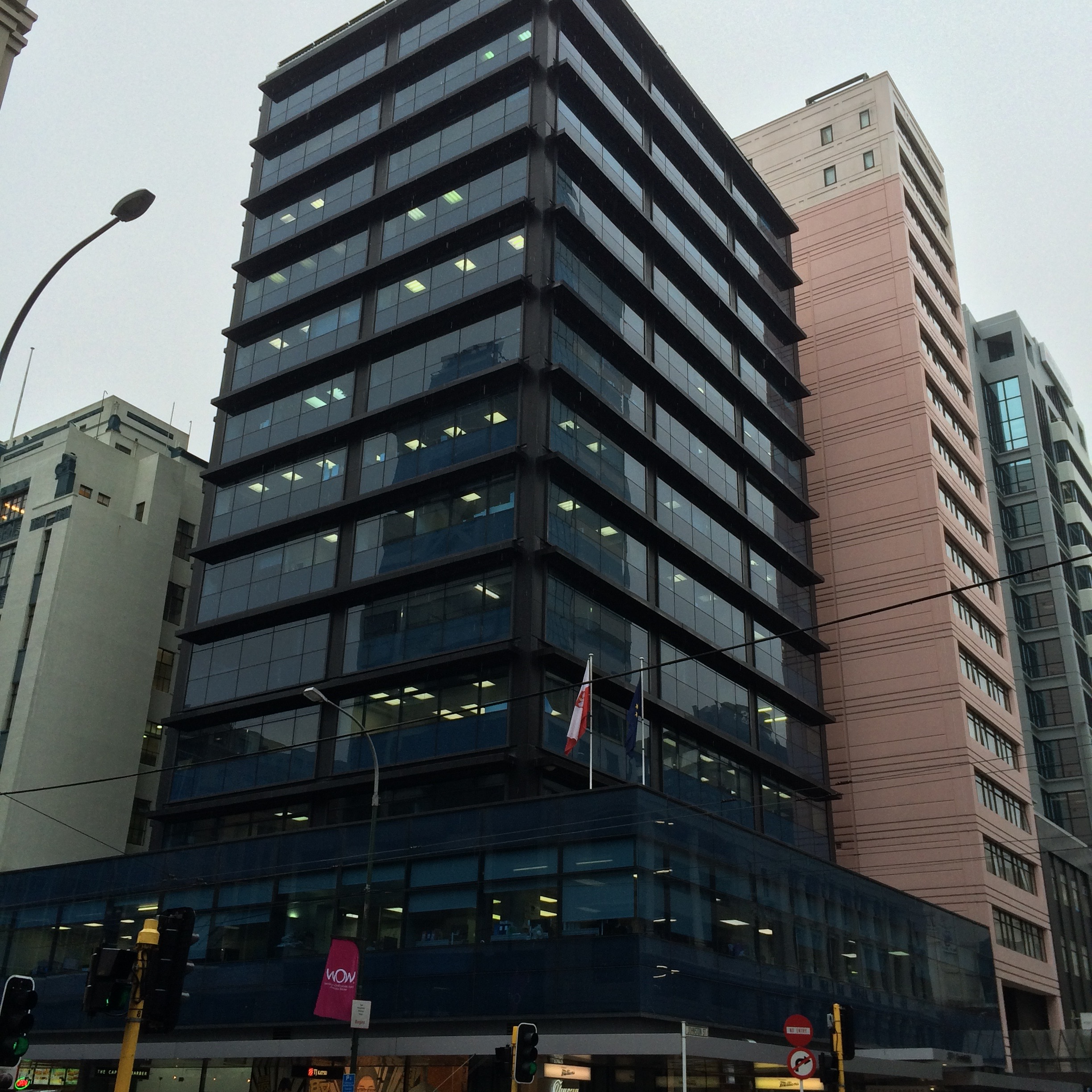
Embassy of Poland in Wellington

== See also ==
- Foreign relations of New Zealand
- Foreign relations of Poland
