= Sultana Laila Hossain =

Bangladeshi diplomat

- সুলতানা লায়লা হোসেন

Ambassador of Bangladesh to Poland
- In office 22 October 2020 – November 2024
- Preceded by: Muhammad Mahfuzur Rahman
- Succeeded by: Md. Mainul Islam

Ambassador of Bangladesh to Morocco
- In office January 2016 – October 2020
- Preceded by: Md Monirul Islam

Personal details
- Education: University of Dhaka

Sultana Laila Hossain is a Bangladeshi diplomat and a former ambassador of Bangladesh to Poland and Morocco. She is the former Consulate General of Bangladesh in Los Angeles.

== Early life ==
Hossain did her bachelor's and master's in microbiology at the University of Dhaka.

== Career ==
Hossain joined the foreign service cadre through the 11th batch of the Bangladesh Civil Service. She had served in the High Commission of Bangladesh in India and the Embassy of Bangladesh in Myanmar. She was the Director General of Consular and Welfare Wing at the Ministry of Foreign Affairs. She was the Consulate General of Bangladesh in Los Angeles.

Hossain was appointed the Ambassador of Bangladesh to Morocco in January 2016 replacing Md Monirul Islam who was appointed the first Ambassador of Bangladesh to Ethiopia. She was replaced by Priyatosh Saha in Los Angeles.

In August 2020, Hossain was appointed ambassador of Bangladesh to Poland. She was concurrently the ambassador of Bangladesh to Ukraine and Latvia.

Hossain communicated with crews of MV Banglar Samriddhi after the ship was hit by a Russian missile during the Russian invasion of Ukraine in 2022. Prime Minister Sheikh Hasina awarded her the Bangabandhu Medal for Diplomatic Excellence for evacuating Bangladeshi citizens from Ukraine.

In March 2024, the government of Bangladesh ordered her recall to appoint her in a new post.
