= Embassy of South Africa, Warsaw =

Diplomatic mission of Australia in Poland

South African Embassy in Poland
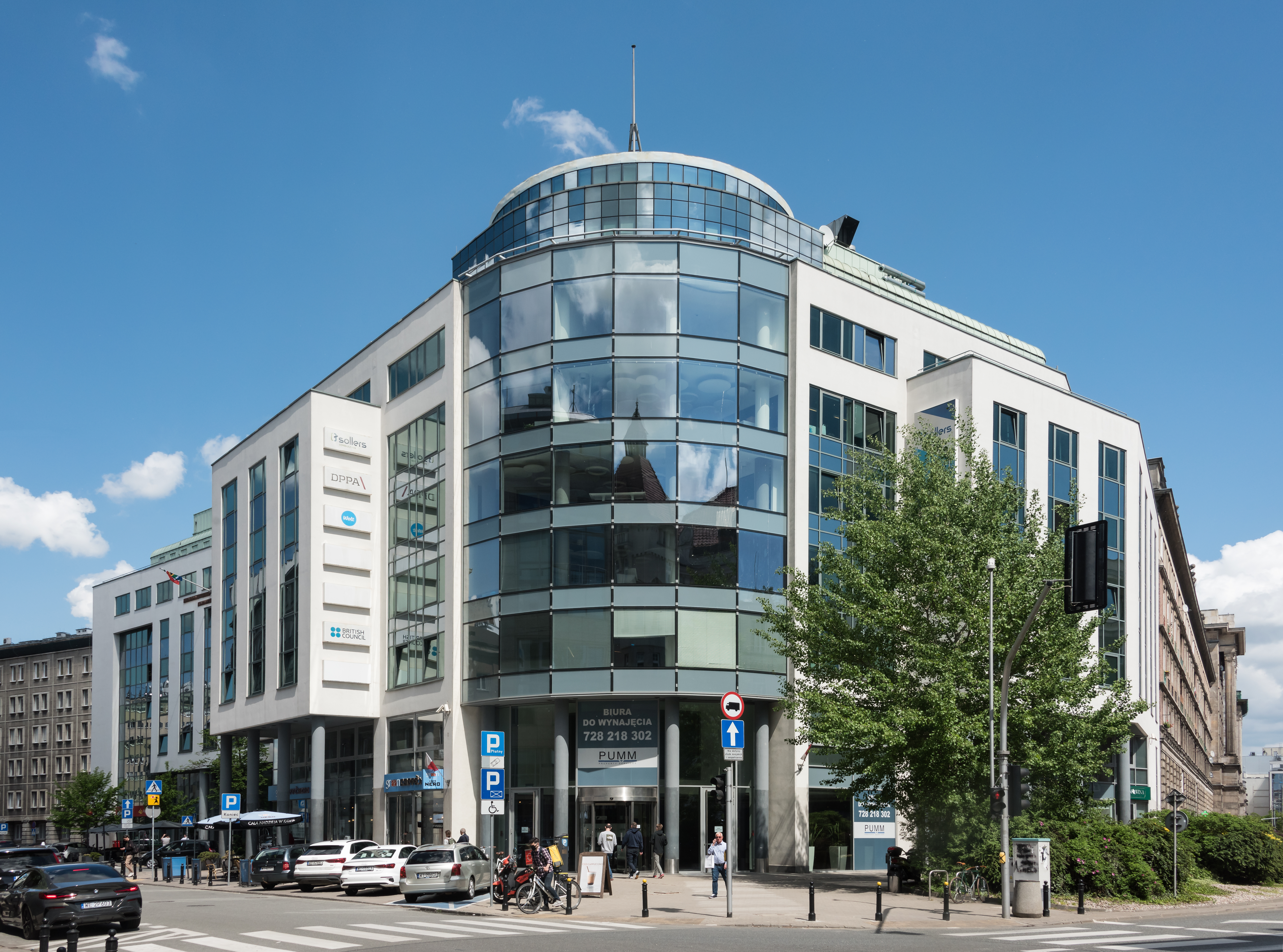
- The Koszykowa 54 building, which houses the embassy, in 2021.

Agency overview
- Formed: 1991
- Type: Diplomatic mission
- Headquarters: 54 Koszykowa Street, Warsaw, Poland; 52°13′22″N 21°00′47″E
- Employees: over 5
- Ambassador responsible: Lehlohonolo Shadrack Ted Pekane

The South African Embassy in Poland (Note: Polish: Ambasada Republiki Południowej Afryki w Polsce) is the diplomatic mission of South Africa in Poland. The embassy is located in the city of Warsaw, Poland, in the Koszykowa 54 building, at 54 Koszykowa Street. The current ambassador of South Africa to Poland is Lehlohonolo Shadrack Ted Pekane.

== History ==
In 1988, the first semi-official diplomatic contact between Poland and South Africa took place. In 1990, an agreement was signed to establish Interests Bureaus in both Pretoria and Warsaw. On 18 December 1991, diplomatic relations between both nations were formally established and both nations respective Interest Bureaus were upgraded to the rank of embassies. Until 2003, the embassy headquarter was located in the building at 18 Belwederska Street. In 2001, it was moved to the Koszykowa 54 building, located at 54 Koszykowa Street, where it operates to the present day.

== See also ==
- Poland–South Africa relations
