= Embassy of Croatia, Warsaw =

Diplomatic mission of Croatia in Poland

Embassy of Croatia in Poland
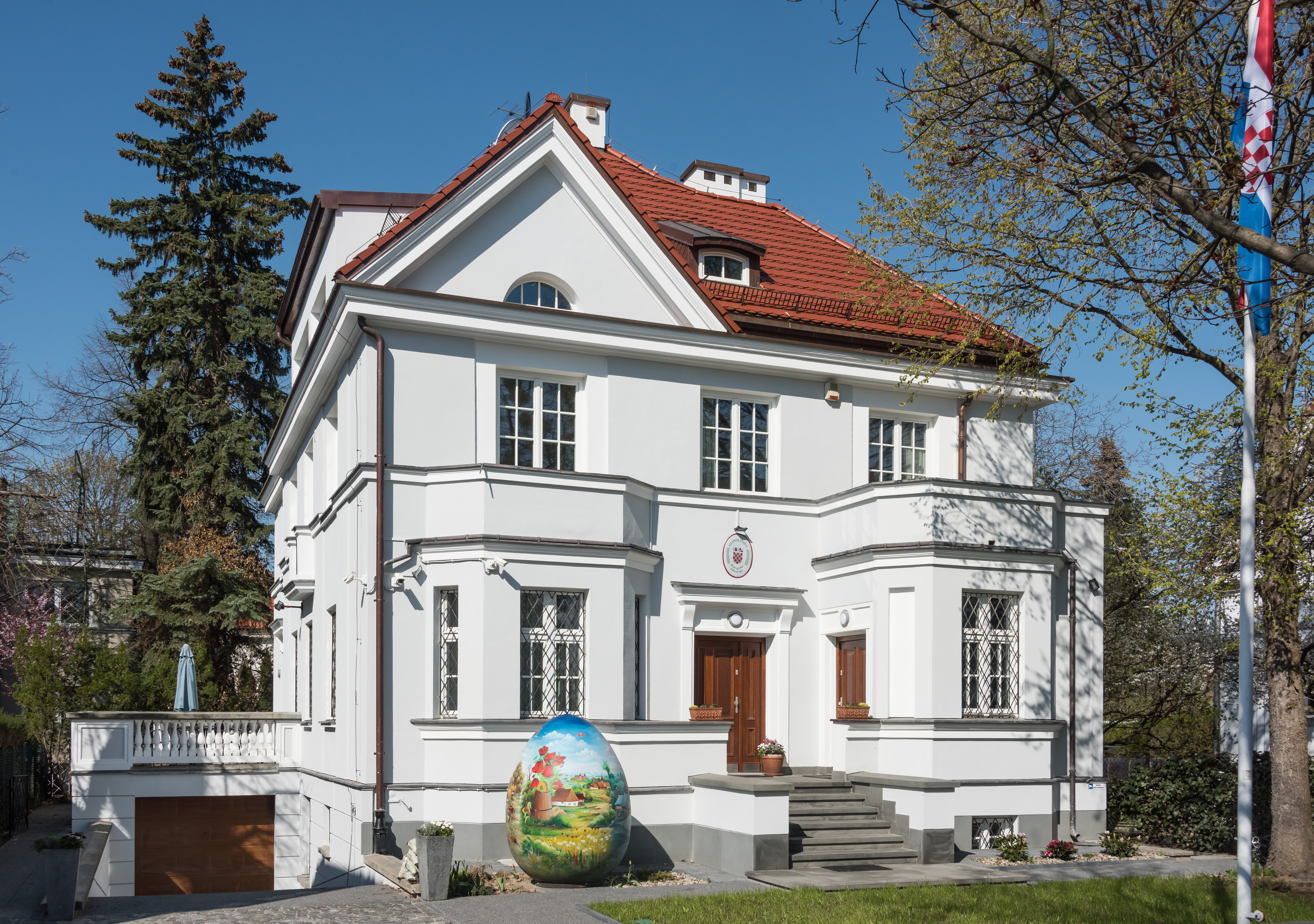
- The building of the embassy of Croatia, located in Warsaw, Poland, at 25 Krasickiego Street, in 2021.
- Location: Warsaw, Poland
- Address: 25 Krasickiego Street
- Coordinates: 52°11′34.50″N 21°01′12.08″E
- Opened: 1993
- Relocated: 2006
- Ambassador: Salem Ait Chabane
- Website: pl.mvep.hr

The Embassy of Croatia in Poland (Note: Polish: Ambasada Chorwacji w Polsce; Serbo-Croatian Latin script: Veleposlanstvo Hrvatske u Poljskoj; Serbo-Croatian Cyrylic: Амбасада Хрватске у Пољској) is the diplomatic mission of Croatia in Poland. The embassy is located in the city of Warsaw, Poland, at 25 Krasickiego Street. The current ambassador of Croatia to Poland is Tomislav Vidošević.

== History ==
The international relations between Croatia and Poland had been established in 1993. The embassy of Croatia had been then established in the city of Warsaw, Poland, in the building at 10 Krasickiego Street, where it operated until 2004. In 2006, the embassy had been re-established in the building at 25 Krasickiego Street, where it operated to the present day.
