= Md. Mainul Islam (police officer) =

Bangladeshi diplomat and retired police officer

- মোঃ ময়নুল ইসলাম
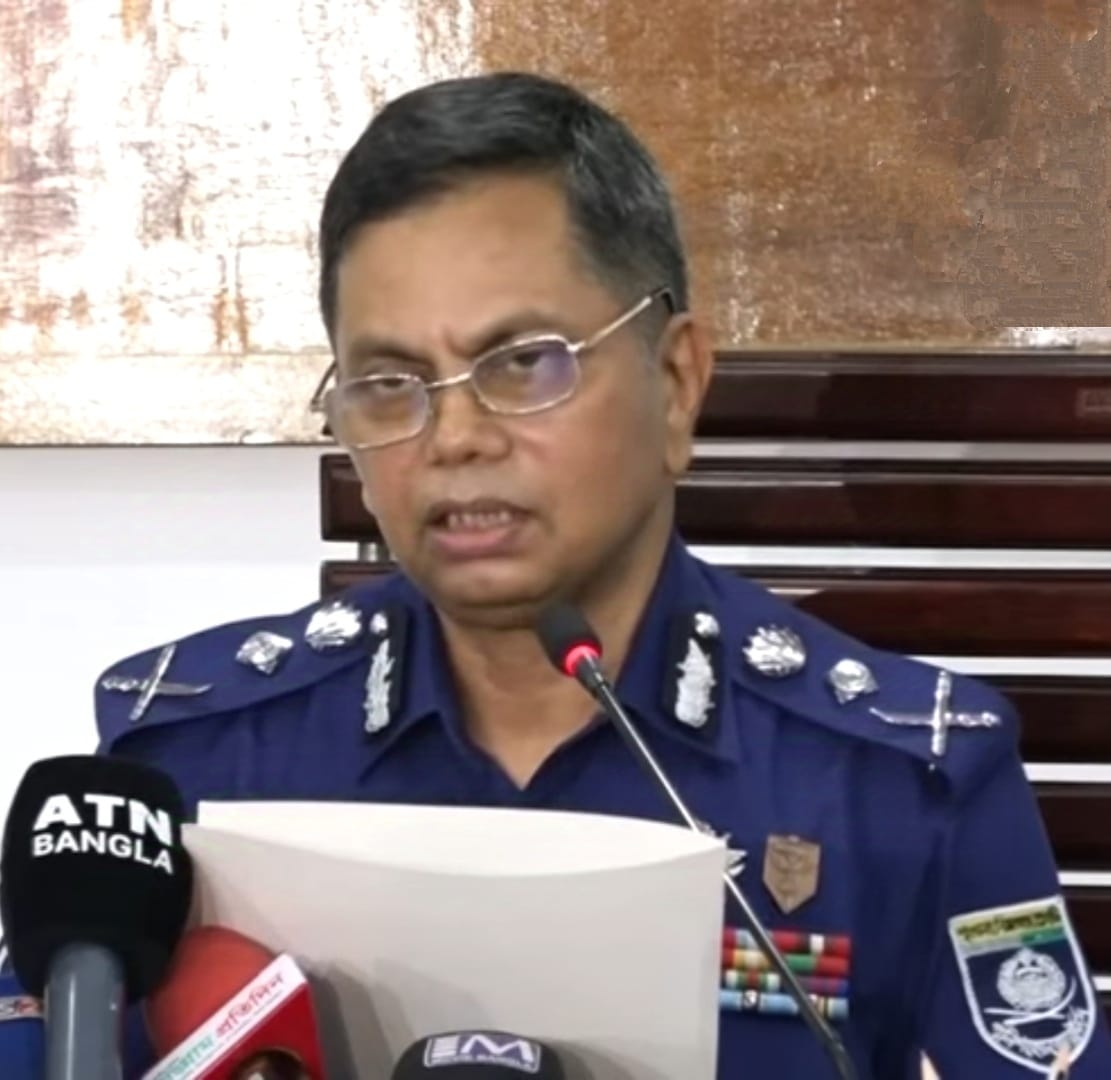
- Mainul in 2024

Ambassador of Bangladesh to Poland
- In office 10 April 2025 – 8 March 2026
- President: Mohammed Shahabuddin
- Prime Minister: Muhammad Yunus (Chief adviser)
- Preceded by: Sultana Laila Hossain
- Succeeded by: Vacant

Inspector General of Bangladesh Police
- In office 6 August 2024 – 20 November 2024
- President: Mohammed Shahabuddin
- Prime Minister: Muhammad Yunus (Chief adviser)
- Preceded by: Chowdhury Abdullah Al-Mamun
- Succeeded by: Baharul Alam

Personal details
- Born: Panchagarh, East Pakistan, Pakistan
- Education: Bangladesh Police Academy; University of Dhaka
- Awards: Bangladesh Police Medal (Bravery) – BPM; President Police Medal (Bravery) – PPM
- Police career
- Allegiance: Bangladesh
- Branch: Bangladesh Police
- Service years: 1991-2024
- Status: Retired
- Rank: IGP

Md. Mainul Islam, NDC, is a Bangladeshi diplomat and retired officer of the Bangladesh Police. He served as the Bangladesh envoy to Poland. He served as the inspector general of Bangladesh Police. Previously, he served as the commandant of the Traffic and Driving School.

== Early life ==
Mainul Islam was born in a Muslim family in Masjid Para of Panchagarh Sadar Upazila, Panchagarh District.

== Career ==
Mainul joined Bangladesh Police as an assistant superintendent of police in 1991. He was from 12th BCS batch. In February 2024, 14 officers of the rank of DIG of police were promoted to additional inspector general of police (additional IGP) and he was one of them. Earlier, he became DIG from additional DIG in 2018. He has also served in police's elite force, Rapid Action Battalion. On 6 August 2024, he became inspector general of Bangladesh Police.

On 26 November 2024, he was appointed an ambassador. On 10 April 2025, he was appointed the Bangladesh envoy to Poland.
