= Subhan =

Subhan or Sobhan (Arabic: سبحان sub·ḥān) is masculine given name and surname of Arabic origin meaning "praise, exalted, glory". Notable people with the name include:

== Given name ==
- Abdul Subhan Khan (died 1991), Nawab of Khar
- Abdul Subhan Qureshi (born 1972), a fugitive from India wanted on terrorism charges
- Abdus Sobhan Chowdhury, zamindar of Bogra
- Abdus Sobhan Golap (born 1956), Bangladeshi parliamentarian
- Abdus Sobahan Ali Sarkar (born 1976), Assam politician
- Abdus Sobhan Sikder (born 1956), Bangladeshi politician
- Sobhan Babu (1937–2008), Indian actor
- Sobhan Khaghani (born 2000), Iranian footballer
- Sobhan Rouhi (born 1947), Iranian wrestler
- Subhan (born 1994), Indonesian para-badminton player
- Subhan Awan (born 1996), Pakistani actor and model
- Subhan Bakhsh (died 1799), Nawab of Masulipatam in northern India
- Subhan Fajri (born 2003), Indonesian footballer
- Subhan Jabrayilov (1983–2020), Azerbaijani military officer
- Subahan Kamal (born 1965), Malaysian businessman and president of the Malaysian Hockey Confederation
- Subhan Ali Khan Kamboh (1766–??), Indian Islamic scholar
- Subhan Quli Khan (1625–1702), sixth ruler of the Bukhara Khanate
- Subhan Raza Khan, former head of the Sufi center Dargah-e-Ala Hazrat in Bareilly, India
- Subhan Qureshi (born 1959), a biologist from Khyber Pakhtunkhwa, Pakistan
- Subhan Quli Qutb Shah (1543–1550), the third Sultan of Qutb Shahi dynasty in southern India

== Middle name ==
- Iqbal Sobhan Chowdhury (born 1943), Bangladeshi journalist

== Surname ==
- Sobhan family of Bengal
  - Farooq Sobhan (born 1940), Bangladeshi diplomat
  - Rehman Sobhan (born 1935), Bangladeshi economist
  - Salma Sobhan (1937–2003), Bangladeshi lawyer and first female barrister of Pakistan
  - Zafar Sobhan (born 1970), Bangladeshi columnist
- Ahmed Akbar Sobhan (born 1952), Bangladeshi business magnate and founder of Bashundhara Group
- Muhammad Abdus Sobhan (1936–2020), Bangladeshi politician and Islamic scholar
- Fazal Subhan (born 1988), Pakistani cricketer
- K. M. Sobhan (1924–2007), former justice of the Supreme Court of Bangladesh
- Mohammad Abdus Sobhan (born 1953), former vice chancellor of the University of Rajshahi
- Nahida Sobhan, Bangladeshi ambassador to Jordan
- Syed Abdus Sobhan (1932–2000), Bangladeshi politician

== Places ==
- Sobhan, a village in Iran
- Sobhaniyeh, a village in Iran
- Sobhanpur, a village in Uttar Pradesh, India
- Subhanpur, Nawada, a village in Bihar, India
- Subhanpur, Kapurthala, a village in Punjab, India
- Subhanpur, Ranga Reddy, a village in Telangana, India
- Subhanpura, a neighbourhood in Gujarat, India

== See also ==
- Subhan'allah, an Arabic phrase meaning "Glory to God"
