= Ikramullah =

Ikramullah (Arabic: اکرام الله) is a male Muslim given name and surname, meaning glory of God. It may refer to

== Males ==
- Mohammed Ikramullah (born 1903), first Foreign Secretary of Pakistan
- Sayed Ikramuddin Masoomi (born 1953), Afghan politician
- Ikramullah Khan Niazi, father of Imran Khan
- Ikramullah Sheikh, Pakistani cricketer

== Females ==
(The following include the wife and three daughters of Mohammed Ikramullah.)

- Shaista Suhrawardy Ikramullah (1915–2000), Pakistani politician, diplomat and author
- Salma Ikramullah, maiden name of Salma Sobhan (1937–2003), Pakistani-British-Bangladeshi barrister, human rights activist and academic
- Naz Ikramullah (born 1938), Pakistani-British-Canadian artist
- Sarvath Ikramullah, maiden name of Princess Sarvath El Hassan (born 1947), Pakistani wife of Jordanian prince
- Fiza Ikramullah, titular character of the 2000 Indian film Fiza, played by Karishma Kapoor
