= Subhanpur =

Subhanpur may refer to the following places in India:

- Subhanpur, Nawada, a village in Bihar
- Subhanpur, Kapurthala, a village in Punjab
- Subhanpur, Ranga Reddy, a village in Telangana
- Subhanpur, Kanpur Nagar, a village in Uttar Pradesh

== See also ==
- Subhanpura, an urban area in Vadodara, Gujarat
