= Prince Hassan bin Talal =

Jordanian prince (born 1947)

Hassan bin Talal
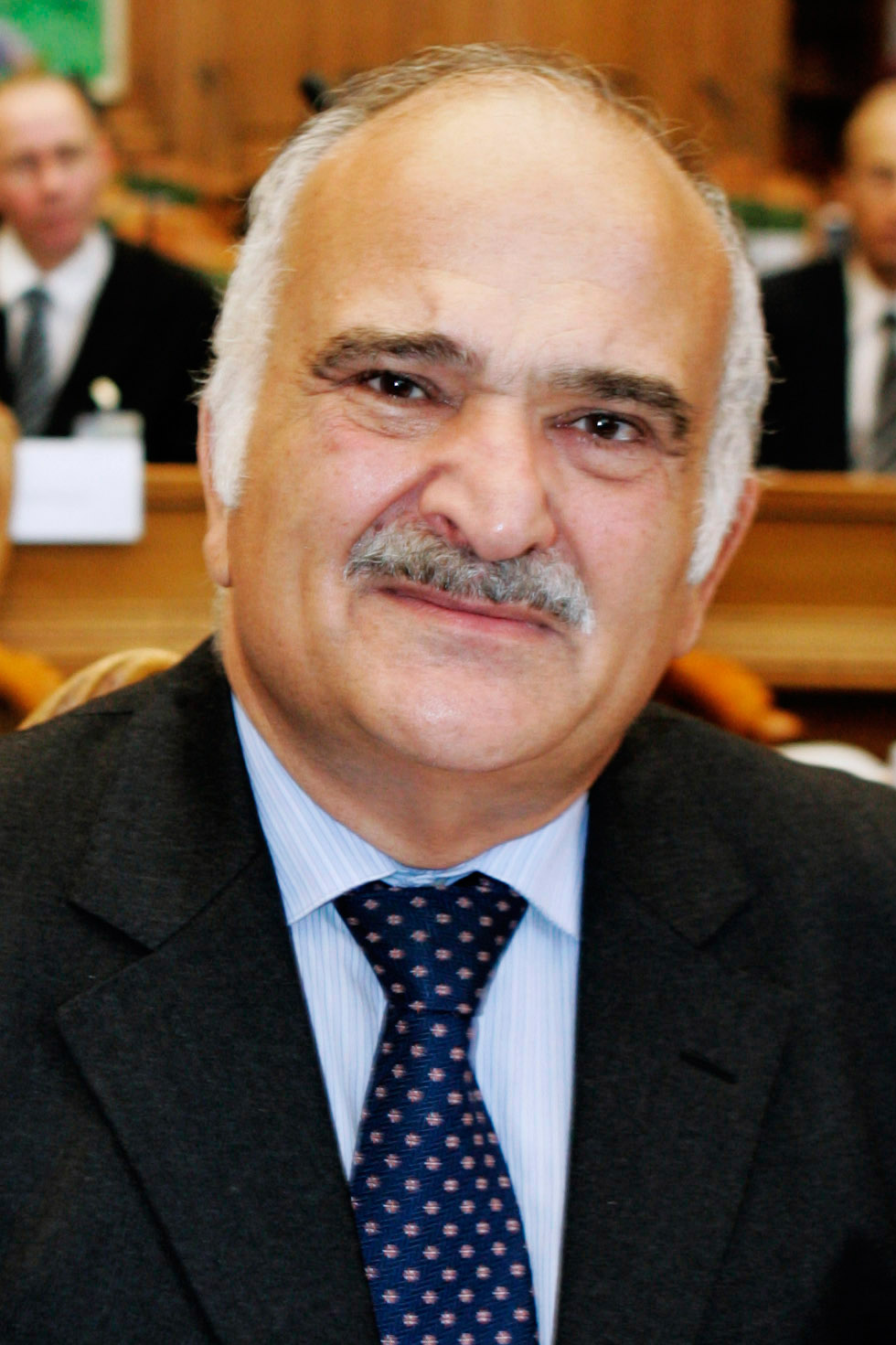
- Prince Hassan in 2006

Crown Prince of Jordan
- Tenure: 1 April 1965 – 25 January 1999
- Monarch: Hussein of Jordan
- Predecessor: Prince Abdullah bin Al-Hussein
- Successor: Prince Abdullah bin Al-Hussein
- Born: 20 March 1947 (age 79); Amman, Jordan
- Spouse: Sarvath Ikramullah (m. 1968)
- Issue: Princess Rahma; Princess Sumaya; Princess Badiya; Prince Rashid
Names
- Hassan bin Talal bin Abdullah bin Hussein
- House: Hashemite
- Father: Talal of Jordan
- Mother: Zein al-Sharaf
- Religion: Islam

Prince Hassan bin Talal (Arabic: الحسن بن طلال, born 20 March 1947) is a member of the Jordanian royal family who was previously Crown Prince from 1965 to 1999, being removed just three weeks before King Hussein's death. He is now 20th in line to succeed his nephew King Abdullah II.

== Background and personal life ==
Prince El Hassan is a Prince of the Hashemite Kingdom of Jordan. He is the third son of King Talal and Queen Zein al-Sharaf. He is thus a younger brother of late King Hussein and uncle of the present King Abdullah II.

Prince El Hassan is a descendant of Mohammed. His family is descended in patrilineage from Hassan, the elder of the two sons of Fatima Zahra and Ali, the daughter and son-in-law of Mohammed.

More recent male-line ancestors served as Sharifs of Mecca. In the early 1900s, the kingdom of Hejaz was set up in western Arabia by the Western powers in order to torment the Ottoman Empire, and Hassan's great-grandfather, already Grand Sharif of Mecca, was made king of this state. That kingdom did not last long, being soon conquered by Al Saud. However, one of the sons of the Grand Sharif, Prince El Hassan's grandfather, King Abdullah I, became king of Transjordan in 1946. In 1949, after annexing the West Bank in Palestine, and "uniting" both banks of the Jordan River, it was constitutionally renamed the "Hashemite Kingdom of Jordan", commonly referred to nowadays as Kingdom of Jordan.

=== Marriage and issue ===
In 1968, Prince El Hassan married Sarvath Ikramullah, whose family belongs to the feudal aristocracy of Bhopal state in central India. Her father, Mohammed Ikramullah, was an Indian politician who chose to move to Pakistan at Partition and became a diplomat there. His brother (Princess Sarvath's uncle), Mohammad Hidayatullah, choosing to remain in India, rose to become the 11th Chief Justice of India and then, after retirement from the judiciary, became the 6th Vice President of India. Princess Sarvath's mother, Begum Shaista Suhrawardy Ikramullah, came from the prominent Suhrawardy family of Undivided Bengal. She was the daughter of Hassan Suhrawardy and first cousin of former Prime Minister of undivided Pakistan, Huseyn Shaheed Suhrawardy.

Prince El Hassan and Begum Sarvath Ikramullah first met in London in 1958, when they were both mere children. Their families knew each other very well and they played together as children. In the mid-1960s, they married with the full consent of their families. They have four children together:

- Princess Rahma (born 13 August 1969)
- Princess Sumaya (born 14 May 1971)
- Princess Badiya (born 28 March 1974)
- Prince Rashid (born 20 May 1979)

== Education ==
Prince El Hassan was educated first in Amman. He then attended Sandroyd School in Wiltshire before going on to Summer Fields School, Oxford, followed by Harrow School in England, then Christ Church, a college of the University of Oxford, where he graduated BA with Honours in Oriental Studies and later proceeded to MA. Hassan is fluent in Arabic, English, French and German. He has a working knowledge of Turkish and Spanish, and studied Hebrew at university.

== Career ==
In 1965, Hassan was named as Crown Prince of Jordan after the constitution was amended. He was frequently regent during his brother's absences from the country. During Hussein's final illness in January 1999, he was replaced by his nephew Abdullah three weeks before the king died. Abdullah subsequently inherited the throne of Jordan.

In 2009, he joined the project "Soldiers of Peace", a film against all wars and for global peace.

On 10 June 2013, he was appointed as the chairman of the advisory board on water and sanitation (UNSGAB) by the United Nations Secretary-General Ban Ki-moon.

=== Removal as Crown Prince ===
As King Hussein was undergoing cancer treatment in mid-1998, the King assigned Crown Prince El Hassan a range of powers and authority to act as regent. With his newly gained powers, Hassan exercised a number of steps to consolidate his position as heir and future king, which included: (1) "orchestrating the removal of the [unpopular] government" of Abdelsalam Majali and appointing former Royal Court chief Fayez al-Tarawneh in his place, (2) organizing dialogue and reconciliation with opposition groups, most prominently the Muslim Brotherhood, and (3) attempting to effect changes at the top of the military. Hassan's attempted changes to the top hierarchy of the military angered King Hussein and led him to resume full duties as king. It is also a commonly cited reason for Hassan's removal as crown prince on 24 January 1999. Hassan's removal took shape through a 14-page typed letter, described by American historian W. Andrew Terrill as "extremely harsh", in which King Hussein expressed "unmistakable disappointment in Crown Prince El Hassan" and ordered his replacement with Hussein's son Abdullah. Terrill describes King Hussein as perhaps having felt that Hassan had "interest in shifting the line of succession to his own family", which led to his dismissal as Crown Prince three weeks before Hussein's death.

Crown Prince El Hassan's attempted consolidation of power led the sickly King Hussein to break off "intensive" treatments for lymphoma and fly back home to Jordan in order to address the issue. At first, the King attempted to negotiate with Hassan, placing the King's younger son Hamzah as Hassan's crown prince to ensure that the line of succession would not switch to Hassan's line. However, Hassan's Pakistani wife Sarvath vetoed the proposal, particularly because of her reported distaste for Hamzah's American-born mother Queen Noor and her desire to have her son Prince Rashid in the line of succession. King Hussein instead replaced Hassan with his own son Abdullah, who had backing within the military and whose position as eldest son of the king would allow him to be enthroned by royal fiat, unlike Hamzah whose enthronement would require confirmation from the Jordanian Parliament.

== Organizations ==
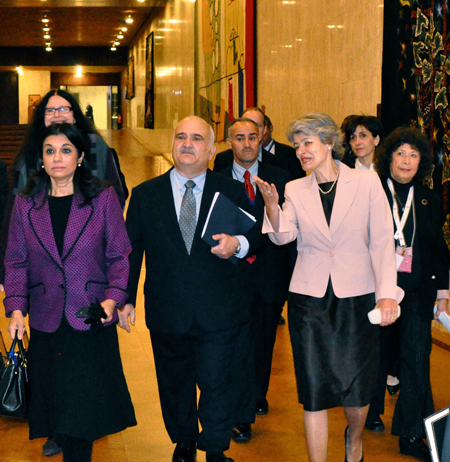
Prince El Hassan bin Talal with Irina Bokova during his visit to UNESCO Headquarters in Paris (2011).

Prince El Hassan has been a very active participant in Jordanian and International civil society. He founded the Royal Scientific Society in 1970, the Annual Bilad Al-Sham Conference in 1978, and the Royal Aal al-Bayt Institute for Islamic Thought in 1980. He has also established the Al al-Bayt University in Mafraq, the Hashemite Aid and Relief Agency, the Islamic Scientific Academy, the Triannual Conferences on the History and Archaeology of Jordan, the Amman Baccalaureate School, and the Al-Hassan Youth Award. He founded and chairs the Independent Bureau for Humanitarian Issues, Independent Commission on International Humanitarian Issues, the Higher Council for Science and Technology, the Royal Institute for Inter-Faith Studies, the Foundation for Intercultural and Interfaith Research and Dialogue, the Arab Thought Forum since 1981, the Kawakibi Democracy Transition Center, and the West Asia – North Africa Forum (WANA Forum), and was chair of the Policy Advisory Commission for the World Intellectual Property Organization from 1999 to 2002.

He has served as the president of the Club of Rome from 1999 to 2007, the board of directors for the Center for Peace Studies and Conflict Resolution at the University of Oklahoma, the Parliament of Cultures, the Royal Jordanian Polo Club, and the International Tolerance Foundation for Humanities and Social Studies, and is honorary president of the Euro-Mediterranean Association for Cooperation and Development since 2012.

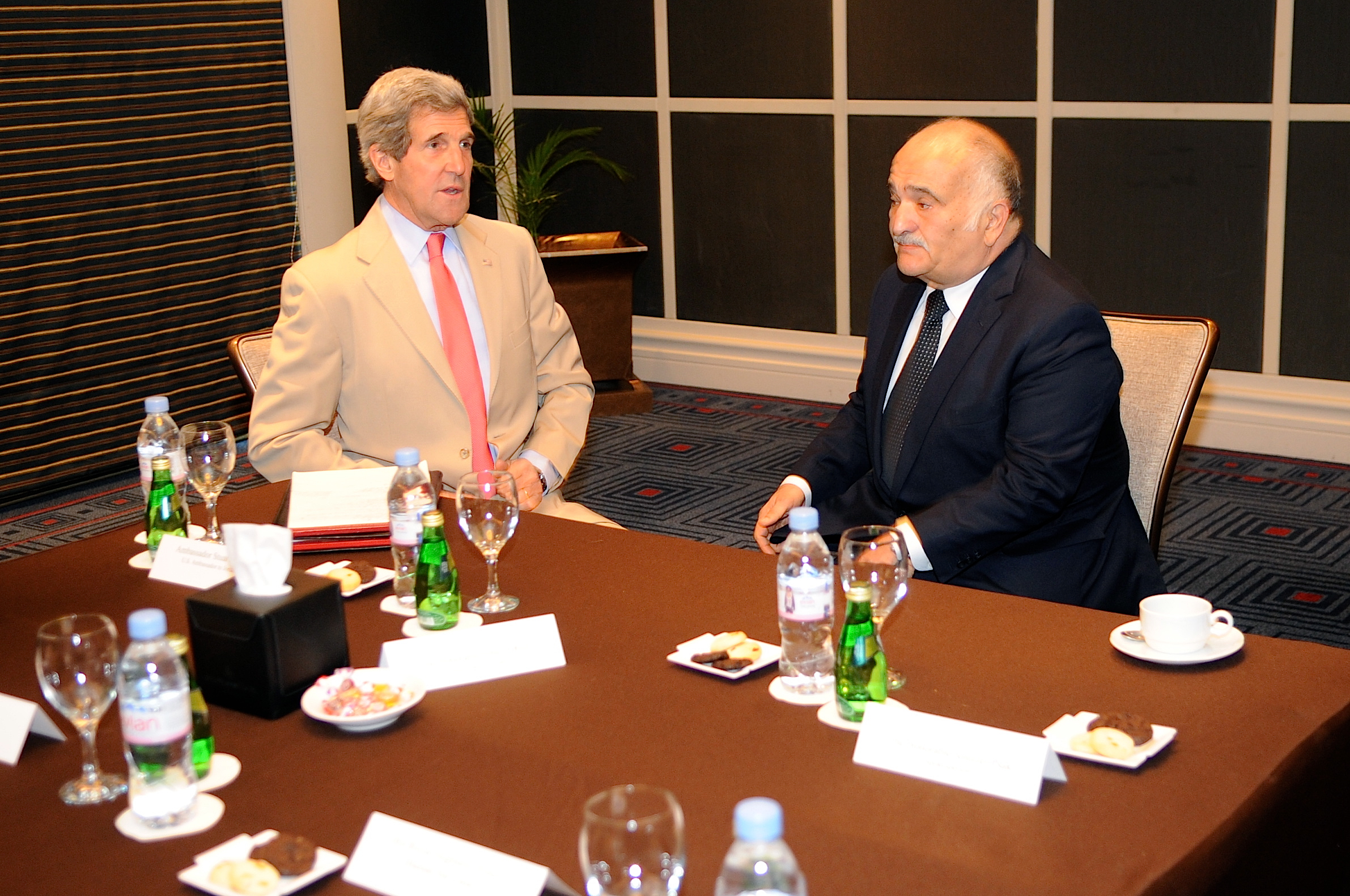
Prince El Hassan bin Talal with Secretary John Kerry (2013).

Prince El Hassan is also a patron of the Post-War Reconstruction and Development Unit at the University of York, the Swiss Rights and Humanity non-profit organization, the British Institute in Amman, and the Woolf Institute, in addition to being a member of the Global Leadership Foundation, the Chairman the United Nations Secretary-General's Advisory Board on Water and Sanitation, the Advisory Board of British think tank Gold Mercury International, the board of directors of the Nuclear Threat Initiative (since 2002), the Board of Trustees of the Foundation for Interreligious and Intercultural Research and Dialogue (FIIRD) at University of Geneva, Switzerland, the Executive Committee of the International Crisis Group, the International Advisory Board of Forum 2000, the Committee of Personalities of Institut Catala De La Mediterrania, the Informal Advisory Group to the United Nations High Commissioner for Refugees, the Commission on Legal Empowerment of the Poor, the International Board of the Council on Foreign Relations, the Board of World Religious Leaders for the Elijah Interfaith Institute, the Trilateral Commission, the Advisory Council for Research of the Center for Democracy and Community Development (since 2010), and the Independent Eminent Experts group of the World Conference against Racism, Racial Discrimination, Xenophobia, and Related Intolerance.

Prince El Hassan supports ecocide becoming a crime at the International Criminal Court stating Ecocide would need to be a true ICC crime inline with the Rome Statute and in harnessing the power of international criminal law for the protection of our shared global government.'

== Honours ==
=== National ===
- Jordan:
- Honorary Knight Grand Cordon with Collar of the Order of al-Hussein bin Ali
- Grand Cordon of the Supreme Order of the Renaissance
- Grand Cordon of the Order of the Star of Jordan
- Grand Cordon of the Order of Independence
- Grand Cordon of the Order of the Star of Jordan
- Grand Cordon of the Decoration of the Star of the Hashemites
- Order of the State Centennial

=== Foreign ===
- Austria: Grand Cross of the Order of Honour for Services to the Republic of Austria, 1st Class
- Bahrain: Collar of the Order of Khalifa
- (Ethiopia) Ethiopian Imperial Family: Grand Cordon of the Order of Solomon
- Hungary: Grand Cross of the Order of Merit of the Republic of Hungary
- Italy: Grand Cross of the Order of Merit of the Italian Republic
- Japan: Grand Cordon of the Order of the Precious Crown
- Malaysia: Knight Grand Cordon of the Order of the Defender of the Realm
- Morocco: Grand Cordon of the Order of Ouissam Alaouite.
- Morocco: First Class of the Order of Intellectual Merit
- Netherlands: Knight Grand Cross of the Order of Orange-Nassau
- Netherlands: Recipient of the King Willem-Alexander Inauguration Medal
- Norway: Grand Cross of the Order of St. Olav
- Sovereign Military Order of Malta: Grand Cross of the Sovereign Military Order of Malta
- Pakistan: Grand Cordon of the Nishan-e-Imtiaz
- Poland: Grand Cross of the Order of Merit of the Republic of Poland
- Spain: Knight Grand Cross of the Order of Charles III
- Sweden: Knight Grand Cross of the Royal Order of the Polar Star
- Sweden: Recipient of the 70th Birthday Medal of King Carl XVI Gustaf
- Taiwan: Order of Propitious Clouds with Special Grand Cordon (1973)
- Tunisia: Grand Cordon of the National Order of Merit of Tunisia
- United Kingdom: Knight Grand Cross of the Royal Victorian Order

=== Honorary degrees and doctorates ===
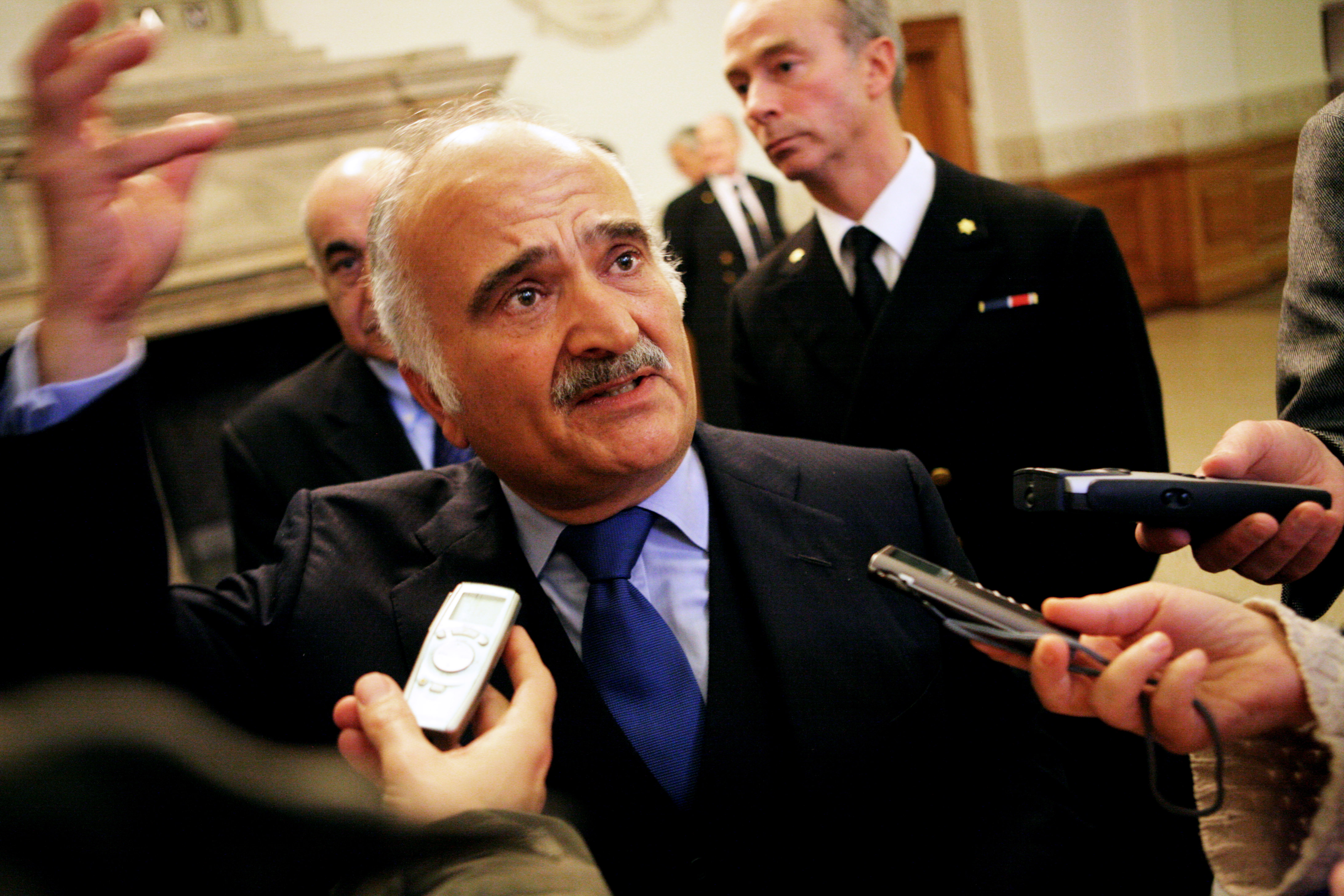
Prince El Hassan bin Talal during a press conference in Copenhagen (2006).

In 2002, Prince El Hassan was awarded an honorary doctorate by the University of York, in recognition of his contribution to the field of post-war reconstruction and development. In 2004 he was awarded an honorary fellowship by York St John University, for his lifelong contribution to peace initiatives in the Middle East, humanitarian projects and inspirational leadership in interfaith dialogue.

- Honorary Degree of Science, Boğaziçi University, Turkey (1981)
- Honorary Degree of Doctor of Civil Law, Durham University, U.K. (1990)
- Honorary Degree of Doctor of Humane Letters, Spertus Institute of Jewish Studies, U.S.A. (1995)
- Honorary Degree of Doctor of Letters, University of Ulster, Northern Ireland (1996)
- Honorary Doctorate, Moscow State Institute of International Relations, Russia (1997)
- Honorary Doctorate of Laws, University of Birmingham, U.K. (1999)
- Honorary Doctorate, Bilkent University, Turkey (1999)
- Honorary Degree of Doctor of Laws (Hon LLB), University of Hertfordshire, U.K. (2000)
- Honorary Doctorate of Theology, University of Tübingen, Germany (2001)
- Honorary Doctorate of Humane Letters, University of Oklahoma, U.S.A. (2002)
- Honorary Doctorate, University of York, U.K. (2002)
- Honorary Doctorate of Laws, University of Portsmouth, U.K. (2002)
- Honorary Doctorate of Laws, International Islamic University, Islamabad, Pakistan (2005)
- Honorary Degree of LLD Honoris Causa, School of Oriental and African Studies (SOAS) at the University of London, U.K. (2005)
- Honorary Degree and the Medal of the World Academy, Old Dominion University, U.S.A. (2005)
- Doctorate Honoris Causa, Universidade Cândido Mendes (UCAM), Brazil (2006)
- Doctorate Honoris Causa, Institute of Higher Education of Brasilia (IESB), Brazil (2006)
- Doctorate Honoris Causa, Faculdades Metropolitanas Unidas (FMU), Brazil (2006)
- Honorary Degree in Human Letters, Brandeis University, U.S.A. (2006)
- Honorary Degree, Soka University, Japan (2006)
- Honorary Doctorate, the Faculty of Humanities, University of Lund, Sweden (2007).
- Doctorate Honoris Causa Eötvös Loránd University, Hungary (2007).
- Honorary Fellowship of the Royal Society of Edinburgh (2008)
- Doctorate Honoris Causa in Multicultural Communication For Human And Nations Development, Hasanuddin University, Indonesia, 2012

== Awards and prizes ==
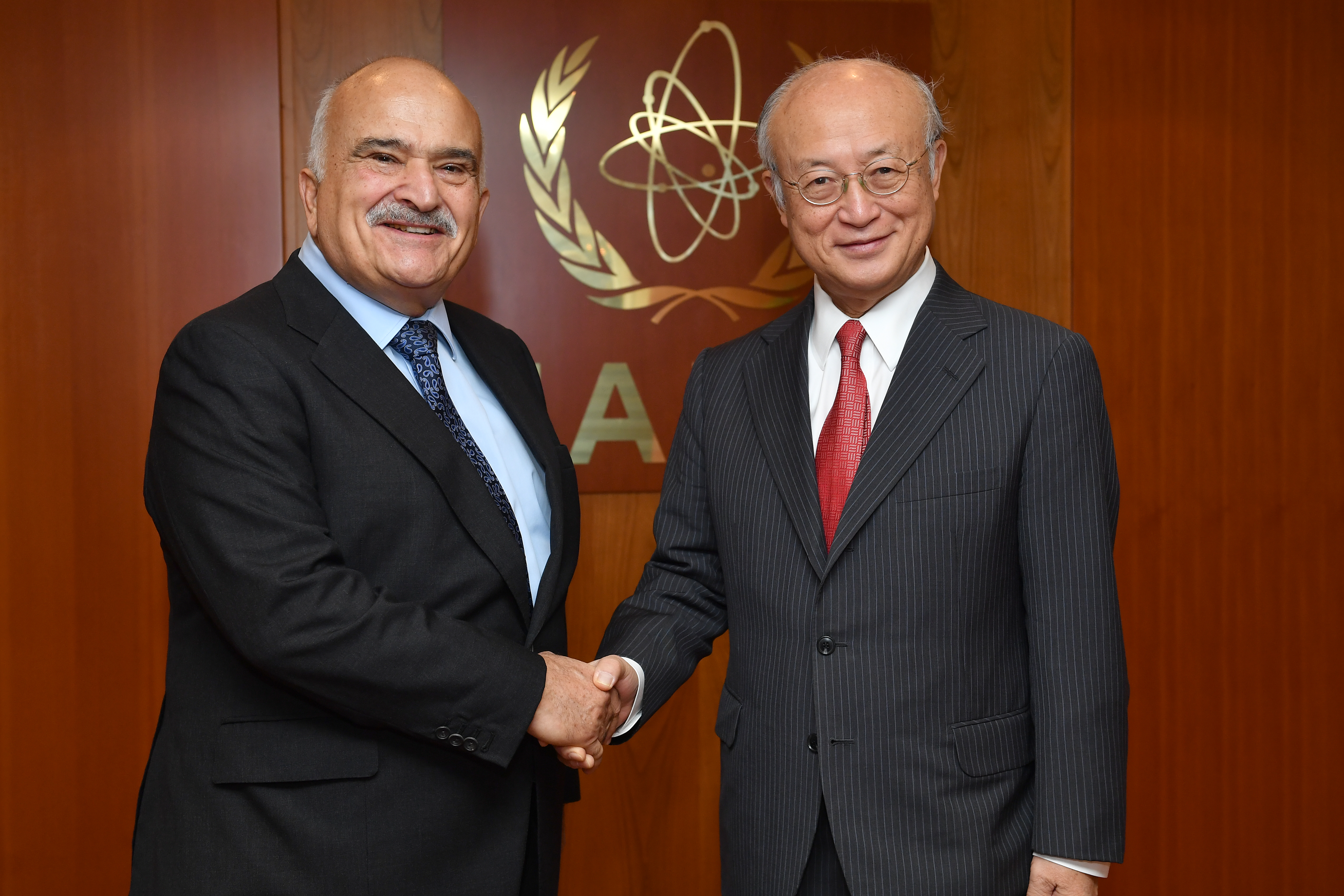
Prince Al Hassan Bin Talal with Yukiya Amano (Vienna, 2017).

- The Four Freedoms Award – May 2014
- The Abu Bakr Al-Siddique Medal of the Organisation of Arab Red Crescent and Red Cross Societies – September 1996.
- The 1995 Science and Society Prize in Madrid.
- The inaugural Gandhi/King/Ikeda Community Builders Medal and Torch of Nonviolence – April 2001.
- The Distinguished Foreign Visitor Award at the John F. Kennedy Presidential Library and Museum in Boston – April 2002.
- The 2003 Rabbi Marc H. Tanenbaum Award for the Advancement of Inter-religious Understanding – June 2003.
- The Abraham Fund Pioneer of Co-existence Award (New York) – January 2004.
- The 2005 Eternal Flame Award by the Annual Scholars’ Conference of the U.S.
- The Calgary Peace Prize – 2007.
- A medal to commemorate the 60th anniversary of the adoption of UNESCO's Constitution, at the inaugural meeting of the Tolerance Foundation held at the Yusupov Palace, St. Petersburg, Russia – May 2007.
- The 2008 Abraham Geiger Award for Peace.
- The Niwano Peace Prize in Japan – May 2008.
- The Sheikh Ahmed Zaki Yamani medallion – Iqbal Academy, UK – 2008.
- The Peace Prize of the City of Augsburg – Germany – 2008.

=== Abraham Geiger Award ===
The 2008 Abraham Geiger Award, named after liberal thinker of Judaism Abraham Geiger (1810–1874), was conferred upon Prince El Hassan bin Talal. The award ceremony was held in Berlin on 4 March 2008. Past recipients include Cardinal Karl Lehmann, Alfred Grosser, Emil Fackenheim and Susannah Heschel.

"Honouring the President Emeritus of the World Conference of Religions for Peace underlines Prince El Hassan's courage in defending pluralism, promoting understanding among different cultures and enhancing dialogue between Jews, Muslims and Christians. The Prince's efforts to promote understanding between the Islamic and Western Worlds are crucial at a time when we seem to be drifting apart, with perceived differences appearing to overwhelm the many things we have in common, both culturally and religiously."

== Publications ==
- (it) Camminare insieme (with Alain Elkann et Elio Toaff), Milan, Bompiani, 2015.
- Peacemaking : An Inside Story of the 1994 Jordanian-Israeli Treaty, Oklahoma, University of Oklahoma Press, 2006.
- To Be A Muslim: Islam, Peace, and Democracy, Alain Elkann coauthor, Sussex Academic Press, Handcover, December 2003, (96 pages), ISBN 1-903900-81-6.
- Continuity, Innovation and Changes : Selected essays, Amman, Majlis El Hassan, 2001.
- (it) Essere musulmano (with Alain Elkann), Milan, Bompiani, 2001.
- Christianity in the Arab World, SCM Press with foreword by the Prince of Wales, 1995, (120 pages), ISBN 0-8264-1094-4.
- Search for Peace : The Politics of the Middle Ground in the Arab East, New-York, St. Martin's Press, 1984.
- Palestinian Self-Determination: A Study of the West Bank and Gaza Strip, Quartet Books, New York 1981, ISBN 0-7043-2312-5.
- A Study on Jerusalem, London – New-York, Longman, 1979.

Royal titles
Preceded by Prince Abdullah bin Al Ghazi	Line of succession to the Jordanian throne 19th position	Succeeded by Prince Rashid bin El Hassan
Preceded by Abdullah bin Hussein	Crown Prince of Jordan; 1965–1999	Succeeded by Abdullah bin Hussein
