= Zafar Sobhan =

Bangladeshi journalist

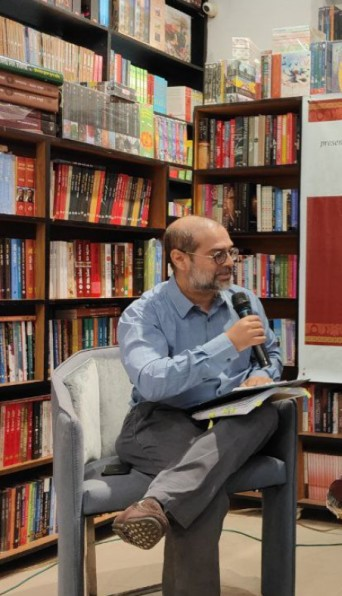
- Born: 19 May 1970 (age 56)
- Education: Pomona College; University of British Columbia; Pepperdine University
- Occupations: Lawyer, teacher, editor, journalist, columnist
- Height: 165 cm (5 ft 5 in)
- Children: 3
- Parent(s): Rehman Sobhan (father); Salma Sobhan (mother)

Zafar Sobhan (born 19 May 1970) is a prominent Bangladeshi public intellectual, lawyer, journalist, and political analyst. He was the Editor of the Dhaka Tribune from 2013 until 2025, one of the major English language newspapers of Bangladesh. Sobhan became the first internationally syndicated columnist to emerge from the English-language Bangladeshi press. In 2025, he founded the blog and weekly newspaper Counterpoint.

== Early life and education ==
Sobhan was born in Bangladesh on 19 May 1970 to Rehman Sobhan and Salma Sobhan. The Sobhan family is related to Huseyn Shaheed Suhrawardy, the last Prime Minister of Bengal and the 5th Prime Minister of Pakistan. Sobhan's father was a member of Bangladesh's first Planning Commission and later an Adviser to the Caretaker Government led by Justice Shahabuddin Ahmed in 1990-91. His mother was the first woman barrister of Pakistan and Bangladesh, as well as a Research Fellow in the Bangladesh Institute of Law and International Affairs. His uncle Farooq Sobhan was the 17th Foreign Secretary of Bangladesh. His aunt is Princess Sarvath al-Hassan, a Jordanian royal and the wife of Prince Hassan bin Talal. Sobhan's education was mostly in the West. He moved to Bangladesh at the age of 10, learned Bengali, and attended the Bangladesh International Tutorial school, as well as boarding school in India. After graduating from Pomona College, he spent a year in Bangladesh teaching English literature in Scholastica before moving to Pepperdine University to study law. He also studied in the University of British Columbia before moving to New York City to work as a corporate lawyer.

In the early 1970s, Sobhan's father Rehman Sobhan was a socialist economist who was a part of Sheikh Mujibur Rahman's government between 1972 and 1975. He was a member of the Planning Commission under Mujib's government. As one of the government's chief economists, Sobhan was responsible for many of the authoritarian socialist policies of the Mujib era, including the nationalization of 90% of industrial, banking and insurance assets, the closure of factories and the stock exchange, the imposition of revenue and profit limits, and the one party socialist state of Bangladesh Krishak Sramik Awami League (BAKSAL) in 1975. The Supreme Court of Bangladesh denounced BAKSAL for "transforming the Constitution beyond any resemblance with the original. Part VIA was incorporated prescribing that there would be only one political party in the State, thereby rendering a severe blow to the democratic set up of the Constitution and paved the way for military dictatorship. The parliamentary form of government was replaced". BAKSAL lasted for seven months from 25 January 1975 and was abolished on 20 August 1975 after the assassination of Sheikh Mujibur Rahman during a military coup.

== Career ==
Sobhan is one of the few Bangladeshi members of the New York State Bar. He was an associate at Debevoise & Plimpton. He also worked as a public school teacher in New York City. In 2003, Sobhan moved to Dhaka to lead the opinions team at The Daily Star. He became the op-ed editor of the newspaper and revived the Forum magazine, which was in publication from 2004 to 2010. He also gained journalistic experience at The Independent, Dhaka Courier and Shokaler Khobor. Sobhan became Bangladesh's first internationally syndicated columnist with articles published in many newspapers and magazines, including The New York Times, Economic and Political Weekly, The Guardian, Himal Southasian, Time, and Outlook among others. He was named by the World Economic Forum as a Young Global Leader. He also became a Yale World Fellow in 2009. In 2013, Sobhan became the founding editor of the Dhaka Tribune. Under Sobhan and Kazi Anis Ahmed, the Dhaka Tribune became the fastest growing newspaper in Bangladesh. The newspaper has been criticized for pushing pro-Awami League talking points.

In 2025, Sobhan launched a weekly newspaper and blog called Counterpoint which is widely regarded as a pro-BNP and pro-government publication that caters to the leadership of the Tarique Rahman-led government. Sobhan's father Rehman Sobhan wrote in the Counterpoint supporting the ban on the Awami League, while the publication advised Prime Minister Tarique Rahman not to travel to India to attend a BRICS summit. Zafar Sobhan describes himself as the founding editor of Counterpoint.

== Views ==
On 24 July 2024, Sobhan warned the Awami League and former Prime Minister Sheikh Hasina that "the future is now" and that the League's hold on power was slipping away fast amid the July Uprising. A few days later, Sheikh Hasina resigned and fled the country on 5 August 2024. In an interview with Karan Thapar, Sobhan critiqued India's approach towards the situation in Bangladesh in light of strong Indian support for the ousted premier Sheikh Hasina. Following Hasina's ouster, Sobhan also criticised Hasina for turning Bangladesh "into a kakistocracy" in an article for the Dhaka Tribune. After the fall of Hasina, Sobhan switched to supporting the Bangladesh Nationalist Party (BNP) and founded a pro-BNP blog called Counterpoint. He has been criticized for always supporting the government of the day in Bangladesh despite concerns over authoritarianism and human rights.

== See also ==
- Mahfuz Anam
