= Princess Badiya bint Hassan =

Jordanian princess

Princess Badiya
- Born: 23 March 1974 (age 51); Amman, Jordan
- Spouse: Khaled Edward Blair (m. 2005)
- Issue: 1
- House: Hashemite
- Father: Prince Hassan bin Talal
- Mother: Sarvath Ikramullah

Princess Badiya bint El Hassan (born 23 March 1974) is a Jordanian princess. She is the third daughter of Prince Hassan bin Talal and Princess Sarvath El Hassan, and a first cousin of King Abdullah II.

She chairs the committee of the Mosaic Awards for Talent in London and is a member of its board. She has also contributed to reinforcing the foundation's work ever since it was created.

== Education ==
She began her studies at the Amman Baccalaureate School before transferring to Sherborne School for Girls. After high school she studied at the University of Oxford getting a Bachelor of Arts and Bachelor's degree in History gaining full honors. Afterwards, she received a Diploma from the University of Law. Finally, she gained a Master of Laws degree in public international law from the London School of Economics.

== Career ==
After studying law at The College of Law in London, Princess Badiya qualified as a barrister in 1998, being called to the Bar at Lincoln's Inn. She is the first member of the Jordanian Royal Family to become a lawyer (She is a non-practicing lawyer).

The Princess is a member of and has collaborated with various international organizations, she gained experience working for the United Nations agencies in Geneva and New York. Her work mostly focuses on promoting interfaith and cross-cultural understanding, human rights and the rights of asylum seekers and refugees. She also participates in the activities of charities and programs that work to support youth and women.

Among her many commitments in the UK:

- She is the Chairman of Mosaic, a mentoring programme founded by Prince Charles. "Mosaic is a Muslim-led charity mentoring young people and offering them positive role models."
- sponsor of the Development and growth of Literacy (DIL)-UK
- sponsor of youth work
- sponsor of Asian Women of Achievement Awards

Her Highness is regularly invited to give lectures on Islam, interfaith relations, human rights and other related issues.

== Marriage ==
Princess Badiya became engaged to Khaled Edward Blair in September 2004 and married him in Amman on June 24, 2005. They have a son, Ali.
