= Alaa Batayneh =

Jordanian businessman and politician (born 1969)

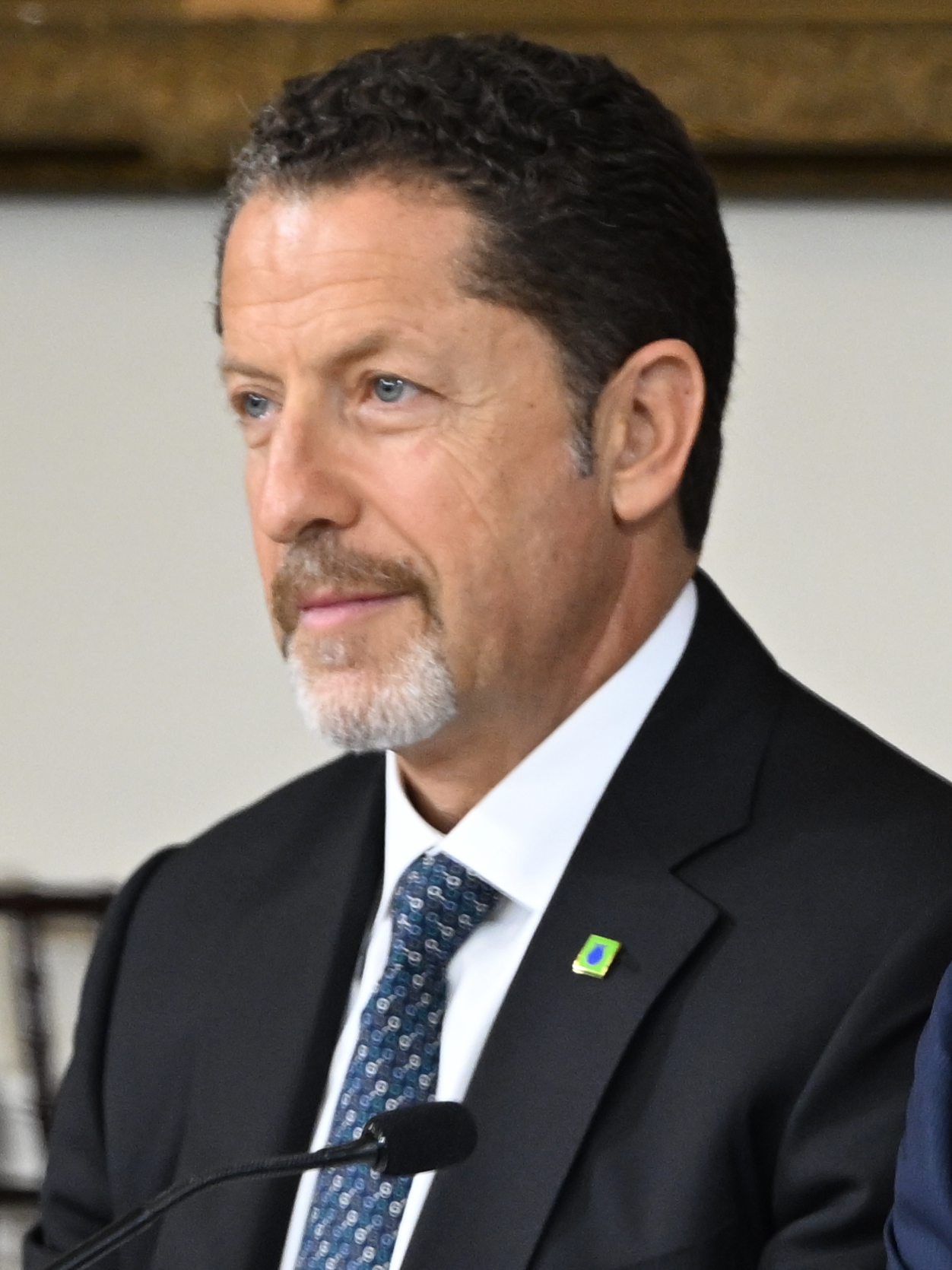

Minister of Energy and Mineral Resources
- In office 11 October 2012 – 30 March 2013
- Monarch: Abdullah II
- Prime Minister: Abdullah Ensour
- Succeeded by: Malek Kabariti

Personal details
- Born: 1969 (age 56–57) Amman, Jordan
- Spouse: Princess Rahma bint Hassan
- Children: 2
- Education: George Washington University

Alaa Arif Batayneh (Arabic: علاء عارف البطاينة; born 1969) is a Jordanian businessman and politician. He is also the son-in-law of Prince Hassan bin Talal. Currently, serves Director of His Majesty Abdullah II office.

== Early life and education ==
Alaa Batayneh was born in Amman in 1969. His family, part of the Batayneh tribe, is from Irbid. His father, Arif Batayneh, is a former member of the parliament and former minister of health.

He received a Bachelor of Science degree in electrical engineering in 1991 and a Master of Science degree in management information systems in 1993, both from George Washington University.

== Career ==
After graduation, Batayneh dealt with business until 2000 in different countries other than his native Jordan, including the United States and the United Kingdom. In addition, he is a member of the board of various firms. From 2000 to July 2005, he served as the general secretary at the ministry of transport. Then he was named as director general of the Jordan customs directorate in 2005 where he served until 2007.

Batayneh was appointed minister of transport to the cabinet headed by Prime Minister Nader Dahabi in November 2007, which was his first ministerial post. He became the minister of public works and housing in a cabinet reshuffle on 23 February 2009, replacing Sahel Majali in the post. Batayneh's term ended in November 2010, and he was named again as the minister of transport to the cabinet led by Prime Minister Samir Rifai. Then he was appointed minister of energy and mineral resources to the cabinet formed by Prime Minister Fayez Tarawneh in May 2012.

Batayneh was named as the minister of energy and mineral resources as well as the minister of transport in the cabinet of Abdullah Ensour on 11 October 2012. Batayneh's term ended on 30 March 2013, and he was succeeded by Malek Kabariti as minister of energy and mineral resources. Nidal Katamine replaced him as transport minister as well. Batayneh was appointed next, by a royal decree, to the upper House of Parliament, becoming a Senator on 25 October 2013.

== Personal life ==
Alaa Batayneh married to Princess Rahma, the eldest daughter of Prince Hassan bin Talal, in July 1997. They have two children named Aysha (born January 2002) and Arif (born February 2006).
