= Tawfique Nawaz =

Bangladeshi lawyer (1949/50–2026)

- তৌফিক নওয়াজ
- Born: 1949 or 1950
- Died: 18 August 2026 (aged 76); Dhaka, Bangladesh
- Education: University of Dhaka (BA, MA); University of Oxford
- Spouse: Dipu Moni
- Children: 2

Tawfique Nawaz (1949 or 1950 – 18 August 2026) was a Bangladeshi lawyer and director of Transparency International Bangladesh. He was a senior advocate of the Appellate Division of the Supreme Court of Bangladesh. He headed the law firm Juris Counsel. He was a member of the Board of Trustees of Transparency International Bangladesh.

== Background ==
Tawfique Nawaz's ancestors were from Midnapore in present-day West Bengal, India. His uncles, Ahmad Jaan and Mohammad Khararul Rehman, had been residents of Midnapore. Nawaz completed his SSC at St. Gregory's High School and HSC from Notre Dame College. He then earned his bachelor's and master's in history from the University of Dhaka. He later studied law at the University of Oxford.

== Career ==
Nawaz was a research associate to Kamal Hossain while studying at the Wadham College, Oxford. Nawaz published The New International Economic Order in 1980 with the University of Michigan. From 1979 to 1981, he served as a director of Bangladesh Institute of Law and International Affairs (BILIA). In 1993, he became an honorary director of the organization and served as the coordinator of human rights project. He was a member of the Supreme Court Bar Association, International Law Association and Oxbridge Society of Bangladesh.

Nawaz sued BRAC Bank Limited saying BRAC as a NGO could not own a bank; the suit was dismissed by the Supreme Court of Bangladesh in 2001. His co-council in the case was advocate Mohsen Rashid.

In 2007, Nawaz, along with Barrister Sheikh Fazle Noor Taposh, represented then Prime Minister Sheikh Hasina after she was arrested by the Fakhruddin Ahmed led Caretaker Government during the 2006–2008 Bangladesh political crisis. He said that Hasina was being deprived of her right to a telephone under the jail code.

In 2011, Nawaz represented the Bangladesh Bank and the Government of Bangladesh in court case that sought to remove Yunus from the bank he founded, Grameen Bank. He appeared as friend of the court in the 2011 case against staff of Biman Bangladesh Airlines on contempt charges after they refused to upgrade the economy seat of Justice AHM Shamsuddin Chowdhury Manik to business class. He was critical of the report, "Biman's flight delayed for altercation on plane", by The Daily Star which he said had damaged the judiciary.

Nawaz led the Government of Bangladesh claim against Niko Resources seeking compensation for the explosion at Tengratila Gas Field. In 2013 Niko tried unsuccessfully to get the case dismissed through the International Centre for Settlement of Investment Disputes. He sought 106 million dollars in damages from Niko on behalf of Petrobangla.

In 2014, Nawaz represented Board of Intermediate and Secondary Education, Dhaka and Inter-Education Board Coordination Committee under the Ministry of Education in a lawsuit by a student asking for a recheck of her exam papers. In April 2014, he and his fellow lawyer SM Munir, were summoned by the High Court who found their comments in a reply to the student as contemptuous of the court. The court asked them why it should not pursue contempt charges against them.

Nawaz was a classical flautist in the tradition of Pandit Pannalal Ghosh, as well as an English-language poet and historian. He was an executive committee member of Shiropa Development Society.Nawaz wrote the entry for Alaap, a traditional form of music in Bangladesh, in Banglapedia, the national encyclopedia of Bangladesh. He was a trustee board member of Transparency International Bangladesh.

According to Zafar Sobhan, the editor of Dhaka Tribune, Nawaz was responsible for driving a wedge between Prime Minister Sheikh Hasina and Nobel Laurate Professor Muhammad Yunus. Sobhan described as "a pettifogging journeyman advocate of little distinction" who had failed the bar multiple times trying to becoming a barrister.

== Personal life and death ==
Nawaz was married to Dipu Moni, a former minister of education of Bangladesh. In 2010, Nawaz accompanied Moni to an official visit to Tripura, India. Together they had a son, Tawquir Rashaad Nawaz, and a daughter, Tani Deepavali Nawaz.

Tawfique Nawaz had a brother, Taimor Nawaz, a medical doctor who was the principal of Bangladesh Medical College and Hospital, Dhaka Taimor treated Tawfique after he suffered a stroke on 17 July 2019. He was unconscious for three weeks following the stroke and underwent a micro-stenting procedure at United Hospital, Dhaka (later renamed to Continental Hospital) on 26 July, performed by specialists from India. A Singaporean specialist saw him the following day and he was taken to Kokilaben Dhirubhai Ambani Hospital, Mumbai for neuro-rehabilitation. In August 2019, then Prime Minister Sheikh Hasina visited Tawfique in Dhaka.

Nawaz died from complications of a stroke on 18 August 2026, aged 76, at Continental Hospital. His wife, Moni, was granted 12-hour parole to attend his funeral.
