= Subhan Qureshi (disambiguation) =

Subhan Qureshi (born 1959), or Muhammad Subhan Qureshi, is a biologist from Khyber Pakhtunkhwa, Pakistan.

Subhan Qureshi may also refer to:

- Abdul Subhan Qureshi, or Abdus Subhan (born 1972), a fugitive from India wanted on terrorism charges

== See also ==
- Subhan (disambiguation)
- List of people with surname Qureshi
