= Prince Rashid bin Hassan =

Member of the Jordanian royal family (born 1979)

Prince Rashid
- Born: 20 May 1979 (age 46); Amman, Jordan
- Spouse: Zeina Shaban (m. 2011)
- Issue: Prince Hassan; Prince Talal
- House: Hashemite
- Father: Prince Hassan bin Talal
- Mother: Sarvath Ikramullah
- Religion: Islam

Prince Rashid bin El Hassan (born 20 May 1979) is a member of the Jordanian royal family. He is the only son of Prince Hassan bin Talal and Princess Sarvath El Hassan and is a first cousin of King Abdullah II.

== Education ==
After completing his primary education in Jordan, he pursued his secondary schooling in the United Kingdom. Prince Rashid obtained an M.A. (Hons.) degree in Oriental Studies from Cambridge University.

- Amman Baccalaureate School
- Port Regis School
- Harrow School
- Royal Military Academy Sandhurst
- University of Cambridge

== Career ==
From 1997 to 2008, he served in the Jordanian Army, and from 2008 to 2021, he served in the Jordanian security services. Notably, from 2014 until his retirement, Prince Rashid commanded The Police Special Operations Group. In 2013, he completed the NATO Defense College Senior Course.

In January 2021, Prince Rashid retired from the Public Security Directorate, achieving the rank of Major General. He then assumed the role of Advisor to King Abdullah II. Additionally, Prince Rashid serves as the Chairman of the Board of Trustees of the Hashemite Charitable Organization, which is Jordan's umbrella organization for relief work.

Furthermore, Prince Rashid is the Head of the Jordanian Taekwondo Federation.

== Marriage ==
Prince Rashid became engaged to Miss Zeina Shaban (born 1988), on 3 July 2010. They married on 22 July 2011, at the Basman Palace in Amman. A table tennis champion, Princess Zeina represented Jordan at the 2003 World Table Tennis Championships in Paris, the 2004 Summer Olympics in Athens and the 2008 Summer Olympics in Beijing where she was also the national flag bearer of Jordan. The couple has two sons: Hassan (b. 2013) and Talal (b. 2016).
