= Princess Rahma bint Hassan =

Jordanian princess (born 1969)

Princess Rahma
- Born: 13 August 1969 (age 56); Amman, Jordan
- Spouse: Alaa Batayneh (m. 1997)
- Issue: 2
- House: Hashemite
- Father: Prince Hassan bin Talal
- Mother: Sarvath Ikramullah
- Religion: Islam

Princess Rahma bint El Hassan (born 13 August 1969) is a Jordanian princess. She is the eldest child of Prince Hassan bin Talal and Princess Sarvath El Hassan. She is a first cousin of King Abdullah II.

== Education ==
- Primary school in Amman, Jordan.
- Sherborne School for Girls in Dorset, England
- Trinity College, Cambridge, England - B.A. in Arts with Hons in the Department of Oriental Studies (1991)
- Trinity College, University of Cambridge, England - M.Phil. in International Relations (1992)

== Marriage and children ==
In July 1997, she married Alaa Batayneh (he was Minister of Energy and Mineral Resources from October 11, 2012 till March 30, 2013.), the son of Arif Al Batayneh (a former member of the House of Representatives, a member of the Senate, Minister of Health and General Director of the Royal Medical Services).

== Career ==
She is currently working in the field of education and sports.

As of 2019, she is the President of the Jordan Gymnastics Federation, as well as the president of the Young Muslim Women Association, where she assumed this role, succeeding her mother in 2007.

== Awards ==
=== National honours ===
- Jordan: Grand Cordon of the Order of the Independence (2006)

=== Foreign honours ===
- Netherlands: Knight Grand Cross of the Order of Orange-Nassau (2006)
