= CSR Centre =

Bangladesh-based non-governmental organization

CSR Centre is a Corporate social responsibility focused Non-governmental organization based in Bangladesh. Founded in September 2007 by former Bangladeshi diplomat Farooq Sobhan, who currently serves as the Chairman of the Board of Trustees, CSR Centre is a source of information, resources, and advisory services for sustainable business practices in Bangladesh.

The organization is currently headed by Shahamin Zaman, who serves as the chief executive officer, an industry professional who also serves as the Executive Director for the United Nations Global Compact Bangladesh Network, launched in collaboration by CSR Centre, the Bangladesh Enterprise Institute, and United Nations Development Programme. The organization frequently partners with various governmental, local, and international organizations on CSR related initiatives across Bangladesh.

Since 2017, the CSR Centre has been working closely with the Ministry of Planning (Bangladesh) to develop a comprehensive national CSR guideline for local businesses.
