= Princess Sumaya bint Hassan =

Jordanian royal

Princess Sumaya
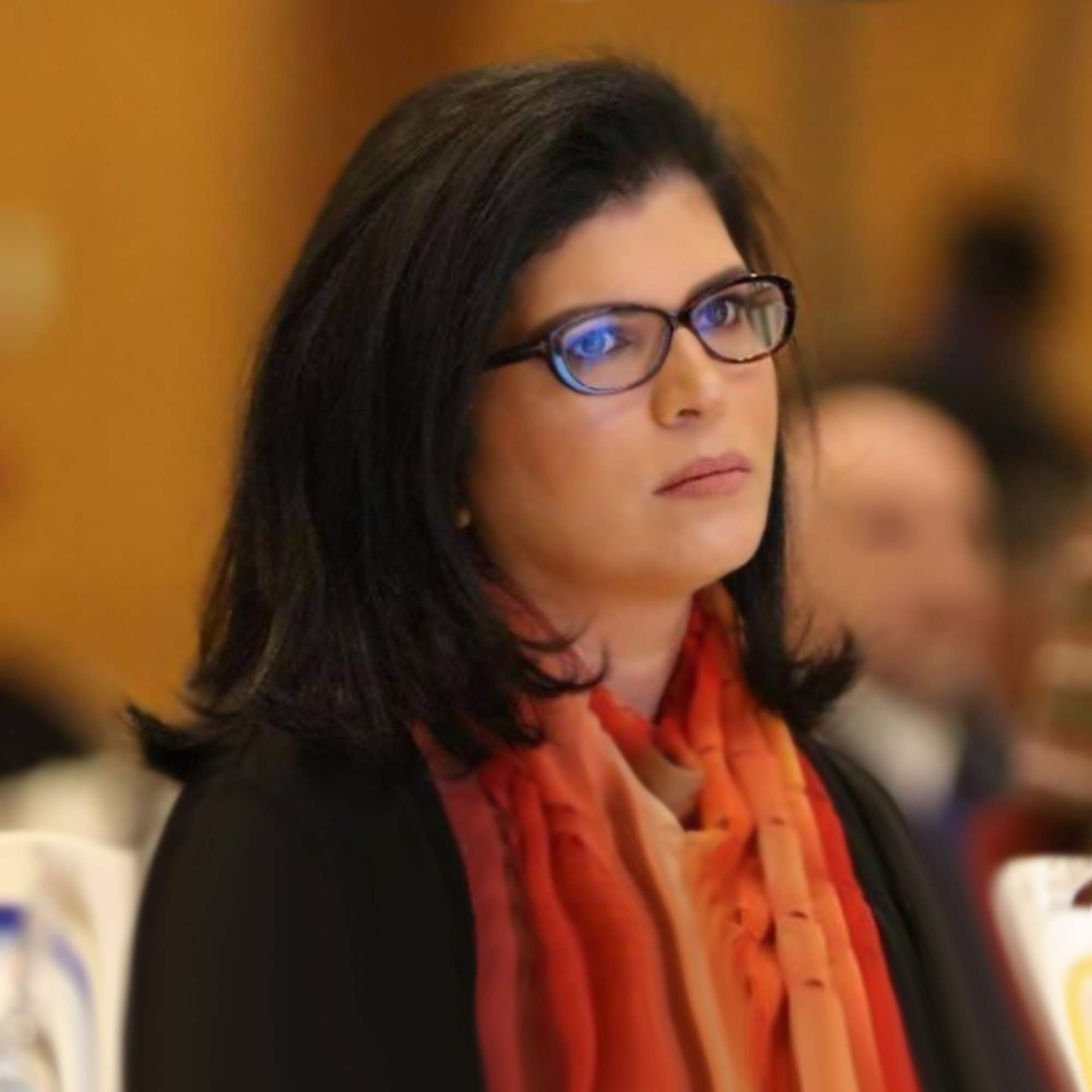
- Born: 14 May 1971 (age 54); Amman, Jordan
- Spouse: Nasser Judeh (m. 1992; div. 2007)
- Issue: 4
- House: Hashemite
- Father: Prince Hassan bin Talal
- Mother: Sarvath Ikramullah
- Religion: Islam

Princess Sumaya bint El Hassan (born 14 May 1971) is a princess of Jordan and a first cousin of King Abdullah II.

== Early life ==
Princess Sumaya was born in Amman on 14 May 1971, and is the second daughter to Prince Hassan bin Talal and Princess Sarvath El Hassan. She received her primary education at the Amman Baptist School in Jordan, and subsequently at the International Community School in Amman.

Princess Sumaya later attended Sherborne School for Girls in Dorset, in England. She went on to graduate from the Courtauld Institute of Art at the University of London with a Bachelor of Arts in the History of Art, specializing in Early Sources of Islamic Art and Architecture.

== Public life ==
In 1991, Princess Sumaya founded the Princess Sumaya University for Technology (PSUT), and has served as the Chairman of PSUT's Board of Trustees ever since. Her aim was to build a regional hub for IT research and development, and today PSUT has become the leading science and technology institution in Jordan and the MENA region.

The Princess was appointed President of the Royal Scientific Society (RSS) in October 2006 by her father Hassan Bin Talal, the founder of RSS.

In her capacity as President of the Royal Scientific Society, Princess Sumaya sits as a member of the Higher Council for Science and Technology (HCST), a government body that advises the State on public policy issues relating to science and technology. She is also founder of the Queen Rania Centre for Entrepreneurship (QRCE), Jordan's first and only university-based centre for Entrepreneurship, and established the Queen Rania National Business Plan Competition for aspiring student entrepreneurs.

She was elected as chair of the Board of Governors of the UN Economic and Social Commission for Western Asia (UN-ESCWA) Technology Centre, based on the RSS campus. She has been a supporter of SESAME for over a decade and has raised awareness of the project at numerous global high-level fora. In May 2017, the King of Jordan invited Princess Sumaya to head the Jordan Delegation at SESAME's official opening.

Princess Sumaya chaired the 8th World Science Forum 2017 held in Jordan from 7–10 November 2017 under the theme of "Science for Peace". The World Science Forum 2017 marked its first time in the Middle East.

Princess Sumaya was named UNESCO Special Envoy for Science for Peace (2017–2019)., and today she serves as a UNESCO Goodwill Ambassador for Science for Peace.

In September 2021, Princess Sumaya took on the responsibility as chair of the Board of Trustees of the Amman Baccalaureate School. She has also been acting as the School Director since September 2022.

Princess Sumaya is the Vice Chairman of the Board of Trustees of the Jordan Museum (Jordan's National Museum).

Princess Sumaya served as President of the World Association of Industrial and Technological Research Organization (WAITRO) from 2019 - 2022.

In 2009, Princess Sumaya became a member of the Jordan Council of Higher Education. She is also a member on the advisory board of the Global Young Academy.

Furthermore, Princess Sumaya is the Honorary President of the Jordan Handball Federation.

== Private life ==
Princess Sumaya was married to Nasser Judeh in August 1992, Jordan's former Deputy Prime Minister and Minister for Foreign Affairs. They have four children: a son, Tariq Judeh (born 1994) - twin brother of daughter, Zein el Sharaf Judeh (born 1994), a son, Ali Judeh (born 1996), and a daughter Sukayna Judeh (born 1998). The couple divorced in 2007.

== Honors ==
- Germany: Order of Merit of the Federal Republic of Germany (6 February 2017)
- Sweden: Member Grand Cross of the Order of the Polar Star (15 November 2022)
