= Naz Ikramullah =

British-Canadian artist

Naz Ikramullah Ashraf
- Spouse: Syed Moin Ashraf (m. 1970; died 2003)
- Parents: Mohammed Ikramullah (father); Shaista Suhrawardy Ikramullah (mother)
- Relatives: Muhammad Hidayatullah (uncle); Huseyn Shaheed Suhrawardy (cousin); Princess Sarvath (sister); Salma Sobhan (sister)

Naz Ikramullah Ashraf (née Naz Ikramullah) is a British-Canadian artist and film producer of Pakistani-Bengali origin.

== Background ==
Ikramullah was born in London, England to a Muslim family. Her father, Mohammed Ikramullah, later became the first Foreign Secretary of Pakistan and her Bengali mother, Shaista Suhrawardy Ikramullah, was one of the first Muslim women to become a politician and diplomat in the Indian subcontinent. Her mother, who later served as a Delegate to the United Nations and an Ambassador to Morocco, was a member of the Suhrawardy family of Calcutta, India. She became a Mohajir by moving to West Pakistan, though many of her prominent relatives remained in India and others remained in what would become Bangladesh.

Amongst her relatives she could count Mohammad Hidayatullah, Vice President and Chief Justice of India and Huseyn Shaheed Suhrawardy, Premier of Bengal and Prime Minister of Pakistan. Her siblings include a brother and two sisters: Inam Ikramullah, Salma Sobhan and Princess Sarvath El Hassan of Jordan.

She settled in Canada in the 1970s and was married to the prominent Canadian Urdu short story writer and novelist, Syed Moin Ashraf, until he died in 2003. He claimed to have descended from the Sufi Saint Ashraf Jahangir Semnani and some of his stories include Fatherhood and Reborn. Together, they have a daughter named Aamna.

== Education ==
Ikramullah was trained as an artist at the Byam Shaw School of Art (BFA) and later specialized in lithography at the Slade School of Fine Art in London.

== Career ==
Ikramullah designed and wrote a filmstrip for the NFB film Making Faces, which won the First Prize for Art Education in Oakland, California in 1989. She also completed a film regarding the cultural life of Muslim women of the Indian Subcontinent. She teaches painting and printmaking at the Ottawa School of Art.

In a review of Ikramullah's 1994 solo exhibition, Nancy Baele of the Ottawa Citizen wrote that "Her paintings and prints...reflect her view that Canada fosters an interior life, Karachi an exterior one. She merges the two through collage, a layered look and the compositional constants of architectural arches and cloaked figures to create an emotional tone of dream-like reverie." In Art India, Pakistani art critic Quddus Mirza describes Ikramullah as belonging to a wave of Pakistani diasporic artists. Her prints and collages are in the Library of Congress, the National Gallery of Jordan and the Cartwright Gallery in Bradford, among others.

In 2014, Ikramullah published a book (with accompanying DVD) about interconnections between Hindu and Muslim cultures called Ganga Jamuni, Silver and Gold: A Forgotten Culture (Toronto: Bayeux Arts, Inc; Dhaka: Bengal Publications, 2013). One reviewer described how Ikramullah's "Westernised education but Ganga-Jamuni moorings helped her in appreciating music, fine arts and the traditional embroidery and designs on clothes."
