= Batayneh =

Al Bataineh or Batayneh (Arabic: البطاينة) is a surname, referring to one of the most prominent and respectful tribes in Jordan from the descent of Shammar .

In English, its written in different way: Albataineh, Albatayneh, Al Bataineh, Al Batayneh, Al-Bataineh, Al-Batayneh. Please visit the page in Arabic for more details ar: البطاينة

Notable people with the surname include:

- Alaa Batayneh (born 1969), Jordanian businessman and politician
