= Ikramullah Sheikh =

Pakistani cricketer

Personal information
- Full name: Ikramullah Sheikh
- Born: 27 November 1980 (age 45); Lahore, Punjab, Pakistan
- Batting: Right-handed
- Role: Wicket-keeper

Domestic team information
- Years: Team
- 2009–present: Cumberland
- 2002/03: Lahore Whites
- 2000/2001– 2001/2002: Water and Power Development Authority

Career statistics
Competition	First-class	List A
Matches	6	2
Runs scored	34	–
Batting average	3.40	–
100s/50s	–/–	–/–
Top score	15	–
Balls bowled	–	–
Wickets	–	–
Bowling average	–	–
5 wickets in innings	–	–
10 wickets in match	–	–
Best bowling	–	–
Catches/stumpings	16/–	1/–
- Source: Cricinfo, 26 March 2011

Ikramullah Sheikh (born 27 November 1980) is a Pakistani cricketer. Sheikh is a right-handed batsman who fields as a wicket-keeper. He was born in Lahore, Punjab.

Sheikh made his first-class debut in the 2000/01 Patron's Trophy for the Water and Power Development Authority against National Bank of Pakistan. He played five first-class matches for the Water and Power Development Authority up to the 2001/02 Patron's Trophy. He also played for the Lahore Whites in a first-class match in the 2002/03 Quaid-i-Azam Trophy against Gujranwala. An unsuccessful batsman in his brief first-class career, he scored just 34 runs at a batting average of 3.40, with a high score of 15. Behind the stumps he did though take 16 catches. He also played two List A matches for the Water and Power Development Authority in the 2001/02 One Day National Tournament, against Sargodha and Faisalabad. He wasn't required to bat in either of these matches.

Sheikh joined Cumberland in England in 2009, a team who play at Minor counties level, below that of first-class level. He made his Minor Counties Championship debut for the county against Hertfordshire and his MCCA Knockout Trophy debut in 2010 against Shropshire. He made twelve appearances in the Minor Counties Championship and nine in the Knockout Trophy.
