= Rehman Sobhan =

Bangladeshi politician

- রেহমান সোবহান
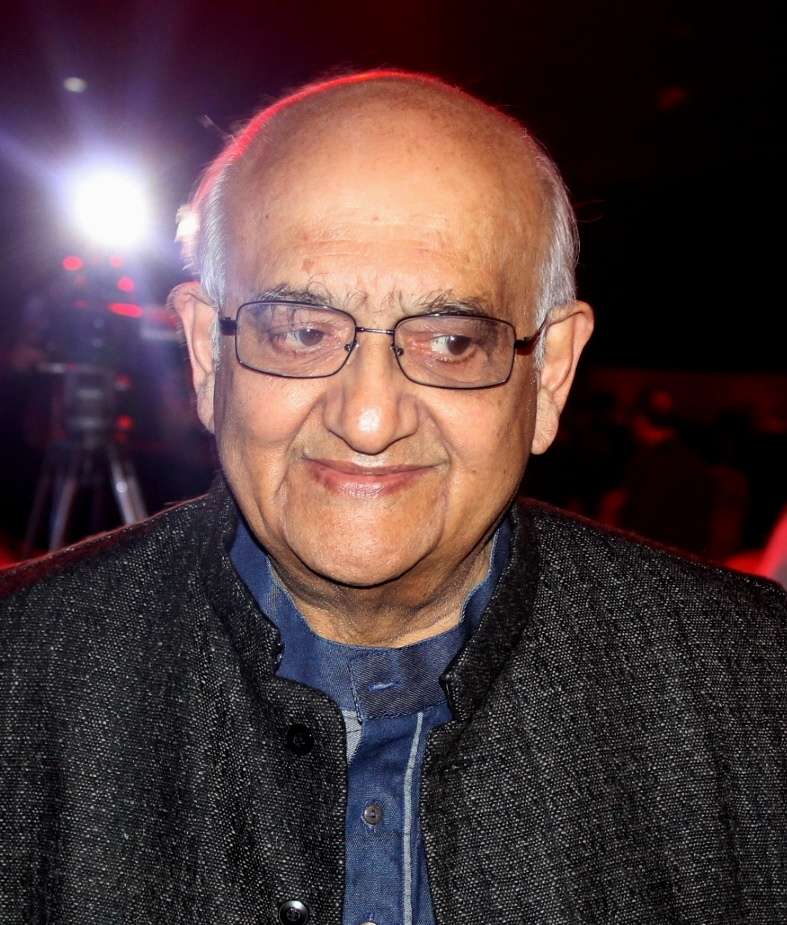
- Sobhan in 2016
- Born: 12 March 1935 (age 91); Calcutta, Bengal, British India
- Education: St. Paul's School, Darjeeling; Aitchison College; Cambridge University; London School of Economics
- Occupation: Economist
- Spouse(s): Salma Sobhan (m. 1962; died 2003) Rounaq Jahan (-present)
- Children: 2
- Parent: Khandker Fazle Sobhan
- Relatives: Farooq Sobhan (brother); Dhaka Nawab family (maternal family); Khawaja Nazimuddin (maternal great-uncle); Khandakar Fazle Rabbi (paternal uncle)
- Awards: Independence Day Award (2008)

Rehman Sobhan (Bengali: রেহমান সোবহান; born 12 March 1935) is a Bangladeshi economist. Regarded as one of the country's top public thinkers, he is the founder and the current chairman of the Centre for Policy Dialogue (CPD), an organisation active in open public discussions of policy issues, particularly in the area of governance.

Sobhan was a leading figure in the Bangladeshi independence movement, noted for his role as a spokesman of the Provisional Government of Bangladesh in the United States during the Bangladesh Liberation War. He was awarded the Independence Day Award, Bangladesh's highest civilian honour, in 2008. He was also part of the first Planning Commission of Bangladesh and he later served as the planning adviser for the first caretaker government of Bangladesh.

== Early life and education ==
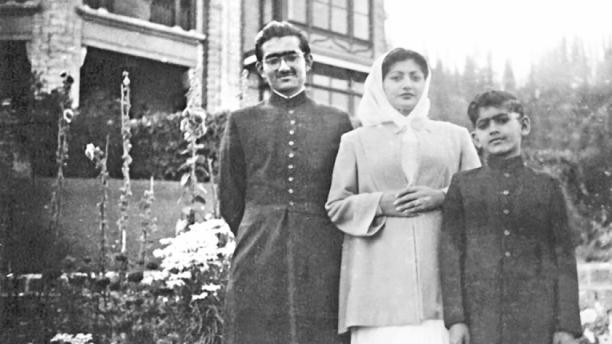
Sobhan with his mother Hashmat Ara Begum and younger brother Farooq Sobhan (1952)

Sobhan's father, Khandker Fazle Sobhan, was a graduate of Presidency College, Kolkata and one of the first Muslims to qualify to attend Royal Military Academy Sandhurst. Later he rose to become a ranked officer in the Indian Police Service. Sobhan's mother, Hashmat Ara Begum, was a niece of Sir Khawaja Nazimuddin, the Governor General of Pakistan during 1948–51 and Prime Minister of Pakistan during 1951–53. Sobhan went to St. Paul's School, Darjeeling at the age of seven and completed his Senior Cambridge examination in 1950. He then attended Aitchison College in Lahore for two years. He went on to Cambridge University to earn his bachelor's degree. In late 1966, Sobhan went to the LSE for his graduate studies but returned, without completing his degree, to Dhaka in March 1969 after the fall of the Ayub regime.

== Career and contributions ==
After completing his undergraduate degree at Cambridge, Sobhan moved to Dhaka in January 1957. He joined as a faculty member of the department of economics at the University of Dhaka in October and served until 1971. In a seminar in 1961, he made a remark on the economic disparities between West and East Pakistan saying "Pakistan consisted of two economies". It made the headlines on the Pakistan Observer and the then President of Pakistan Ayub Khan expressed the opposite point of view.

In the 1960s, Sobhan, with a number of other nationalist economists under the intellectual leadership of Nurul Islam, contributed to the drafting of the six-points programme that became the basis for the struggle for autonomy in the then East Pakistan. The writings of this group of economists on the regional disparity between West Pakistan (Pakistan since 1971) and East Pakistan (Bangladesh since 1971) played an important role in fomenting nationalist aspirations of the people of Bangladesh. During the liberation war (from 26 March to 16 December 1971), he was a roving ambassador for Bangladesh and lobbied in the United States.

After the independence of Bangladesh in 1971, Sobhan became one of the four members of Sheikh Mujibur Rahman's Planning Commission headed by Nurul Islam. The Planning Commission was responsible for many of the authoritarian socialist policies of the Mujib era, including the nationalization of 90% of industrial, banking and financial assets in 1972, the closure of the stock exchange, the state's takeover of West Pakistani-owned factories, the imposition of profit limits and revenue limits, land ownership restrictions, and socialist policies which culminated in the short-lived one party socialist state of BAKSAL in 1975. According to Sobhan himself, the Planning Commission was “expected to give expression to the goals proclaimed by the government for realizing a socialist economic policy”. Sobhan left the Planning Commission after the assassination of Sheikh Mujibur Rahman. Between 1976 and 1979, he was a visiting fellow at Queen Elizabeth House, University of Oxford. Upon his return to Bangladesh, he became the director of the Bangladesh Institute of Development Studies (BIDS), which was originally established as the Pakistan Institute of Development Economics (PIDE) and was relocated to Dhaka in 1970 by Nurul Islam to pioneer the scholarly study of development economics.

Sobhan was also appointed as the planning advisor of the Caretaker Government in Bangladesh in 1990–91. As part of his role, he set up 29 task forces with over 250 experts of the country which covered a range of topics to serve newly elected government after the fall of the Ershad regime. In a 2008 interview, he shared that the recommendations proposed by these task forces were largely ignored by the incoming government. According to him, this provided an impetus for him to found Centre for Policy Dialogue (CPD) in 1993 following his retirement from BIDS.

He has authored several books, including the notable Untranquil Recollections, which is a series that documents the history of Bangladesh from British rule to the early years of independent Bangladesh.

== Family ==
Sobhan married Salma Sobhan in 1962. She was the first woman barrister in Pakistan, an academic and human rights activist. After her death in 2003, he then married Rounaq Jahan, a political scientist and Distinguished Fellow at CPD. Sobhan's younger brother, Farooq Sobhan, is a former diplomat and the current President of Bangladesh Enterprise Institute, a private-sector think-tank of Bangladesh. His son Zafar Sobhan was the editor of the English daily Dhaka Tribune published from Dhaka.

== Selected bibliography ==
=== Books ===
- Sobhan, Rehman (1968). Basic democracies works programme and rural development in East Pakistan. Dacca, Bangladesh: Bureau of Economic Research, University of Dacca; distributed by Oxford University Press. OCLC 652243660.
- ——; Ahmed, Muzaffar (1980). Public enterprise in an intermediate regime: a study in the political economy of Bangladesh. Bangladesh: Bangladesh Institute of Development Studies. OCLC 773118575.
- —— (1982). The crisis of external dependence: the political economy of foreign aid to Bangladesh. London, U.K. Bangladesh: Zed Press University Press. ISBN 9780862321970.
- —— (1983). Public enterprise and the nature of the state: the case of South Asia. Dhaka, Bangladesh: Centre for Social Studies. OCLC 11134168.
- —— (1983). Rural poverty and agrarian reform in the Philippines. Rome, Italy: Food and Agriculture Organization of the United Nations. OCLC 20375354.
- —— (1990). From aid dependence to self reliance: development options for Bangladesh. Dhaka, Bangladesh: Bangladesh Institute of Development Studies, University Press. OCLC 614997139.
- —— (1991). Debt default to the development finance institutions: the crisis of state sponsored entrepreneurship in Bangladesh. Dhaka, Bangladesh: University Press. ISBN 9789840511556.
- —— (1991). Public allocative strategies, rural development, and poverty alleviation: a global perspective. Dhaka, Bangladesh: University Press. ISBN 9789840511587.
- —— (1992). Planning and public action for Asian women. Dhaka, Bangladesh: University Press. ISBN 9789840511983.
- —— (1993). Rethinking the role of the state in development: Asian perspectives. Dhaka, Bangladesh: University Press. ISBN 9789840512096.
- —— (1993). Bangladesh: problems of governance (governing South Asia). Delhi, India: Konark Publishers. ISBN 9788122003024.
- —— (1993). Agrarian reform and social transformation: preconditions for development. London Atlantic Highlands, New Jersey: Zed Books. ISBN 9781856491693.
- ——; et al. (1995). Experiences with economic reform: a review of Bangladesh's development, 1995. Dhaka, Bangladesh: Centre for Policy Dialogue University Press Limited. ISBN 9789840513086.
- —— (1996). Aid dependence and donor policy: the case of Tanzania, with lessons from Bangladesh's experience. Dhaka, Bangladesh: Centre for Policy Dialogue University Press Limited. ISBN 9789840513369.
- —— (1998). Towards a theory of governance and development: learning from East Asia. Dhaka, Bangladesh: Centre for Policy Dialogue University Press Limited. ISBN 9789840514151.
- —— (2000). Growth or stagnation?: A review of Bangladesh's development 1996. Dhaka, Bangladesh: Centre for Policy Dialogue University Press Limited. ISBN 9789840513888.
- —— (1998). Crisis in governance: a review of Bangladesh's development 1997. Dhaka, Bangladesh: Centre for Policy Dialogue University Press Limited. ISBN 9789840514366.
- —— (2000). Trends in the post-flood economy: a review of Bangladesh's development 1998-1999. Dhaka, Bangladesh: Centre for Policy Dialogue University Press Limited. ISBN 9789840515417.
- —— (2001). Changes and challenges: a review of Bangladesh's development 2000. Dhaka, Bangladesh: Centre for Policy Dialogue University Press Limited. ISBN 9789840515882.
- —— (2005). Privatisation in Bangladesh: an agenda in search of a policy. Dhaka, Bangladesh: Centre for Policy Dialogue University Press Limited. ISBN 9789840517046.
- —— (2005). A citizen's social charter for South Asia: an agenda for civic action. Dhaka, Bangladesh: Centre for Policy Dialogue University Press Limited. ISBN 9789840517435.
- —— (2005). A macro policy for poverty eradication through structural change. Helsinki: United Nations University, World Institute for Development Economics Research. ISBN 9789291906741.
- —— (2010). Challenging the injustice of poverty: agendas for inclusive development in South Asia. New Delhi Thousand Oaks: SAGE. ISBN 9788132106234.
- Hussain, Akmal (2014). Democracy, sustainable development, and peace : new perspectives on South Asia. New Delhi New Delhi: Oxford University Press. ISBN 9780199082834.
- —— (2016). Untranquil Recollections: The Years of Fulfilment. New Delhi: SAGE. ISBN 978-93-5150-986-8,
- —— (2021). Untranquil Recollections: Nation Building in Post-Liberation Bangladesh. New Delhi: SAGE. ISBN 978-93-5388-739-1.
- Jahan, Rounaq; Sobhan, Rehman, eds. (2024). Fifty Years of Bangladesh: Economy, Politics, Society and Culture (1st ed.). New York: Routledge. ISBN 9781032532851.

=== Chapters in books ===
- Sobhan, Rehman (2009), "Agents into principals: democratizing development in South Asia", in Kanbur, Ravi; Basu, Kaushik (eds.), Arguments for a better world: essays in honor of Amartya Sen | Volume II: Society, institutions and development, Oxford New York: Oxford University Press, pp. 542–562, ISBN 9780199239979.
- —— (2014), "Reconstructing democracy in South Asia", in Dubey, Muchkund; Hussain, Akmal (eds.), Democracy, sustainable development, and peace: new perspectives on South Asia, New Delhi: Oxford University Press, ISBN 9780198092346.

=== Journal articles ===
- Sobhan, Rehman; Bhattacharya, Debapriya (September 1986). "Courting private foreign investment: the Bangladesh experience". Development Policy Review. 4 (3): 211–232. doi:10.1111/j.1467-7679.1986.tb00382.x.
- —— (June 2002). "Aid effectiveness and policy ownership". Development and Change. 33 (3): 539–548. doi:10.1111/1467-7660.00267.
- —— (2003). "Globalization and the challenge to democracy". International Journal of Development Issues. 2 (2): 1–14. doi:10.1108/eb045831.
- —— (4 September 2004). "Structural dimensions of malgovernance in Bangladesh". Economic and Political Weekly. 39 (36). EPW Research Foundation: 4101–4108.
- —— (March 2005). "The twelfth SAARC summit charting a road map for South Asian cooperation". South Asian Survey. 12 (1): 3–19. doi:10.1177/097152310501200101. S2CID 154285088.
- —— (July 2005). "Increasing aid for poverty reduction: rethinking the policy agenda". IDS Bulletin. 36 (3): 61–67. doi:10.1111/j.1759-5436.2005.tb00222.x.

== See also ==
- List of Bangladeshi people#Economists
