= Bangladesh Institute of Law and International Affairs =

Research institute in Bangladesh

- Formation: 1972
- Headquarters: Dhaka, Bangladesh
- Region served: Bangladesh
- Official language: Bengali
- Website: Bangladesh Institute of Law and International Affairs

The Bangladesh Institute of Law and International Affairs (BILIA) is the oldest think tank in Bangladesh. It is housed in the former residence of Huseyn Shaheed Suhrawardy on Road 7, Dhanmondi, Dhaka.

== History ==
BILIA was established as a government-funded think tank on law, foreign policy, and international law. A future president of Bangladesh, Abdus Sattar, served as its chairman from 1974 to 1975. The think tank is housed in the Dhanmondi residence of former British Bengal premier and Pakistan PM Huseyn Shaheed Suhrawardy. BILIA traces its origins to the Pakistan Law Institute, which was set up in Dhaka in the 1960s. BILIA can also be compared with the Pakistan Institute of International Affairs, which was set up in 1947 and modelled after Chatham House. It was renamed as the Bangladesh Institute of Law and International Affairs in 1972 after the creation of Bangladesh.

In December 1974, BILIA hosted the Third International Criminal Law Conference. The meeting supported calls for the creation of a global penal court, which crystallized with the creation of the ICC in 1998. The conference was presided over by Robert Kurt Woetzel while Kamal Hossain, as Foreign Minister of Bangladesh, delivered a keynote address. Distinguished professors of international law from around the world gathered in Dhaka to attend the conference. In the late 1970s, the BILIA chairman, Justice Abdus Sattar, was appointed Vice President of Bangladesh by President Ziaur Rahman. Sattar later became the president of Bangladesh. Prominent lawyer and human rights activist Salma Sobhan, who was the first woman barrister of Bangladesh and Pakistan, was a research fellow at BILIA. Tania Amir, a prominent barrister, has also been the honorary secretary of BILIA. BILIA has also been affiliated with Syed Ishtiaq Ahmed, Kamruddin Ahmed, Rokanuddin Mahmud, and Muzaffar Ahmed Chowdhury.

== Publications ==
BILIA publishes two journals, including the Bangladesh Journal of Law and the Journal of International Affairs. The law journal has been edited by Shahdeen Malik, Mizanur Rahman, and Justice Naimuddin Ahmed, among others. The international affairs journal has been edited by Ambassador Fakhruddin Ahmed, among others. For many years, the Supreme Court Reports were published by BILIA with Salma Sobhan as its editor. Some of the books published by BILIA include the following.

- United Nations Convention on the Law of the Sea (UNCLOS) and Delimitation of Maritime Boundaries: A Bangladesh Perspective (2024) by AKM Emdadul Haque
- Foreign Policy of Bangladesh Making New Waves (2023) by Lailufar Yasmin
- Case Management in Reducing Backlog: Towards Transplant of Australian Practice to Bangladesh Courts (2023) by Umme Tahara
- Intelligence, National Security, and Foreign Policy, A South Asian Narrative (2016) by ASM Ali Ashraf
- Bangladesh in International Relations 2012-13 (2014) by CR Abrar
- Why SAARC Is Less-Effective? A Neo-Realist Explanation of India's Role in SAARC (2013) by Noor Mohammed Sarkar
- Petroleum Contracts: Stability and Risk Management in Developing Countries (2011) by Dr. Abdullah Al Faruque
- Judicial Training in the New Millennium : An Anatomy of BILIA Judicial Training with Difference (2005) by BILIA
- Single Currency in South Asia (2004) by Wali-ur-Rahman
- Transit and Transshipment (2004) by Wali-ur-Rahman
- Monograph on Chinese Military Modernization: Implications for the Region (2003) by Major General Mohammad Aminul Karim
- Rights of the Citizen under the Constitution and Law (1975) by Fazle Kaderi Mohammad Abdul Munim
- Report on Legal Aspects of Population Planning in Bangladesh (1978) by Mohammad Sohrab Ali, M. Zahir, and Khondokar Mahmud Hasan
- Legal Status of Women in Bangladesh (1978) by Salma Sobhan
- Legal Aspects of the New International Economic Order (1980) by Tawfique Nawaz
- Bangladesh: The First Four Years (1980) by Nurul Momen
- The Legal System of Bangladesh (1980) by Azizul Hoque
- Delay in Courts and Court Management (1988) by M. Zahir
- Legal Aspects of Martial Law (1989) by Fazle Kaderi Mohammad Abdul Munim
- No Better Option? Industrial Women Workers in Bangladesh (1990) by Hameeda Hossain and Salma Sobhan
- Special Issue on President Bill Clinton's Visit to South Asia (2000) by BILIA
- Civil Procedure Code (2000) by Justice Naimuddin Ahmed
- Human Rights in Bangladesh: A Study of Standards & Practices (2001) by BILIA and Ford Foundation

== BILIA Library ==
The BILIA Library is considered to be one of the best archives and legal resource centers in Bangladesh. It has a corner dedicated to Justice Muhammad Habibur Rahman, which includes books donated by the former Chief Justice of Bangladesh. The library has law reports from the 1920s and 1930s, including cases from the Permanent Court of International Justice. According to historian Umran Chowdhury, "the division of assets [between Bangladesh and Pakistan] was never settled. As the former eastern wing, Bangladesh was entitled to a substantial share of the assets of the former central government of both wings. According to Professor Rehman Sobhan, perhaps the most valuable asset that Bangladesh retained was the library of the Pakistan Institute of Development Economics (PIDE), which is today the Bangladesh Institute of Development Studies (BIDS). PIDE was shifted to Dhaka in 1970 by Professor Nurul Islam. The Dhanmondi residence of Huseyn Shaheed Suhrawardy, which housed the Pakistan Law Institute, was also retained. It was renamed as the Bangladesh Institute of Law and International Affairs (BILIA). The BILIA Library is also a rich repository of legal and political history".

== See also ==
- Royal Institute of International Affairs (Chatham House)
- Pakistan Institute of International Affairs
