= Sobhanpur =

Village in Budaun, Uttar Pradesh

- village
- Location in Uttar Pradesh, India Sobhanpur (India)
- Coordinates: 28.043883°N 79.173918°E
- Country: India
- State: Uttar Pradesh
- District: Badaun

Government
  - Body: Gram panchayat

Population (2011 Census of India)
  - Total: 1,381

Languages
  - Official: Hindi
- Time zone: UTC+5:30 (IST)
- Vehicle registration: UP 24

Sobhanpur is a village in Jagat Tehsil, Budaun district, Uttar Pradesh, India. The Budaun railway station is located at the distance of 7 kilometer from the village. Its village code is 128378. As per the report of 2011 Census of India, The total population of the village is 1,381, where 760 are males and 621 are females. The village is administrated by Gram Panchayat.
