= Princess Sarvath El Hassan =

Jordanian princess (born 1947)

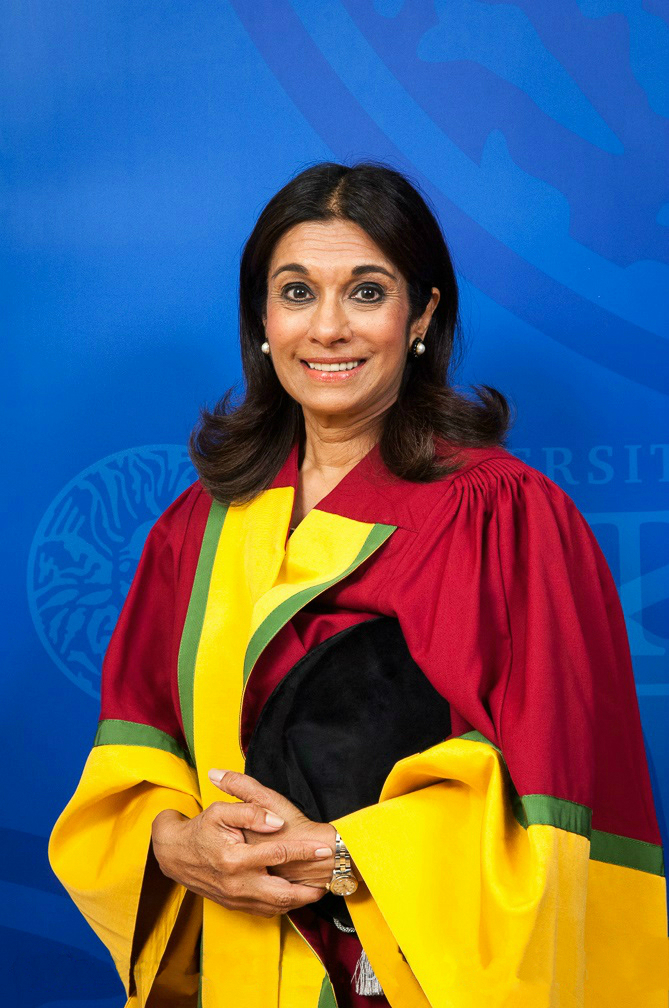
- Princess Sarvath in 2015 receiving an honorary doctorate
- Born: Sarvath Ikramullah; 24 July 1947 (age 79); Calcutta, Bengal Presidency, British India
- Spouse: Prince Hassan bin Talal (m. 1968)
- Issue: Princess Rahma; Princess Sumaya; Princess Badiya; Prince Rashid
- House: Hashemite
- Father: Mohammed Ikramullah
- Mother: Shaista Suhrawardy Ikramullah

Princess Sarvath El Hassan (born Sarvath Ikramullah on 24 July 1947) is a Jordanian royal and the wife of Prince Hassan bin Talal of Jordan.

== Family ==
She was born in Calcutta, British India on 24 July 1947. Her father, the Bhopal-born Ambassador Mohammed Ikramullah, was a senior member of the Indian Civil Service in the government of British India prior to Partition, having joined the ICS in 1927. He went on to join the Partition Committee of Muhammad Ali Jinnah, later becoming Pakistan's first Secretary of State for Foreign Affairs and Ambassador to Canada, France, Portugal and the United Kingdom. His last post was as chairman of the Commonwealth Economic Committee. Sarvath's Bengali mother, the Kolkata-born Begum Shaista Suhrawardy Ikramullah, was a writer and one of Pakistan's first two female members of Parliament. Begum Ikramullah also served as Ambassador to Morocco and several times as a delegate to the United Nations. Princess Sarvath has three siblings, including the late Bangladeshi barrister Salma Sobhan and the British-Canadian filmmaker Naz Ikramullah.

Her paternal uncle, Mohammad Hidayatullah, was Chief Justice of India from 1968 to 1970, Vice President of India from 1979 to 1984, and served as acting president of India twice. Her maternal uncle, Huseyn Shaheed Suhrawardy, was the Prime Minister of Bengal and the Prime Minister of Pakistan. Her mother's paternal family are direct descendants of the 12th-century Persian Sufi philosopher, Shaikh Shabuddin Suhrawardy. Many of her male and female forebears, on both sides of her family, were poets, writers and academics, including the social reformer Begum Badar un nissa Akhtar, Ibrahim Suhrawardy and Abdullah Al-Mamun Suhrawardy. She lived in all the countries that her parents were posted to, but mostly received her education in Britain, and received her bachelor's degree from the University of Cambridge. She first met Prince Hassan in London in 1958, when they were both 11 years old.

== Marriage and children ==
Princess Sarvath married Prince Hassan bin Talal of Jordan in Karachi, Pakistan, on 28 August 1968. They live in one of the oldest houses in Amman and have four children:

- Princess Rahma (born 13 August 1969)
- Princess Sumaya (born 14 May 1971)
- Princess Badiya (born 28 March 1974)
- Prince Rashid (born 20 May 1979)

== Public life ==
Princess Sarvath served as Crown Princess of Jordan for over 30 years. She initiated, sponsored and continues to support many projects and activities in Jordan, mainly in the field of education, in addition to issues pertaining to women and the family, social welfare and health. Much of her work focuses on promoting education, assisting disadvantaged women, encouraging community service and helping people with mental and learning disabilities. In 1974, she founded the Bunayat Centre for Special Education, which teaches life skills to disabled children and provides support to their parents.

Princess Sarvath and her husband continue to represent Jordan at international royal events. In 2013, she rode in the carriage of Queen Elizabeth II at Royal Ascot.

There have been tensions between Princess Sarvath and her sister-in-law, Queen Noor. The tensions between the Queen, who wanted her own son Hamzah to be proclaimed crown prince, and the then-Crown Princess Sarvath were exacerbated by the matter of succession during the last days of King Hussein's life. According to off-the-record briefings by anonymous palace officials in Amman, a rumour was circulated that Princess Sarvath had drawn up plans for a redecoration of the Jordanian royal apartment before King Hussein had even died of cancer. This allegedly occurred while the King was undergoing chemotherapy in the United States and Prince Hassan was running the country in his place. In contrast, other sources state that the Princess only gave orders for some state apartments to be spruced up in preparation to receive a foreign delegation. Still other accounts imply that only a kitchen was renovated for the visit of Germany's then-President, Roman Herzog, who was travelling with his native cook. According to US-based newspaper Pakistan Link, the theory that the Princess' Pakistani roots prevented her husband's accession has been "much publicized in Pakistan".

She received an honorary degree of Doctor of Education from the University of Bath in 2015 to mark her achievements as a longstanding and influential supporter of inspiring young people.

== Organizations ==
(Former) Member

- Council of UNESCO's International Fund for the Promotion of Culture
- Council of Foundation of the International Baccalaureate Organization
- International Board of Voluntary Services Overseas
- International Board of the United World Colleges (present)

Patron

- Young Muslim Women's Association since 1972
- Malath Foundation for Humanistic Care
- Jordanian Charity Association for Phenylketonuria
- Jordanian Osteoporosis Prevention Society

Chairwoman

- El Hassan Bin Talal Award for Academic Excellence committee
- National Selection Committee for the John F. Kennedy School of Government Middle East Educational Fellowship

(Vice) President

- Jordan National Red Crescent Society – Honorary VP from 1994 to 2004
- Arab Society for Learning Difficulties – Honorary President since 2001
- Centre for Phonetics Research at the University of Jordan – President

Founded

- Jordanian United World Colleges National Committee; chair from 1981 to 1995
- Amman Baccalaureate School; has chaired its Board of Trustees since 1981

== Interests ==
Princess Sarvath speaks several languages, including Arabic, English, French and Urdu. The Princess is honorary president of the Jordanian Badminton Federation and was the first woman in Jordan to obtain a black belt in Taekwondo.

== Honours ==
=== National honours ===
- Jordan: Dame Grand Cordon of the Supreme Order of the Renaissance, Special Class

=== Foreign honours ===
- Japan: Dame Grand Cordon of the Order of the Precious Crown
- Netherlands: Dame Grand Cross of the Order of Orange-Nassau
- Netherlands: Recipient of the King Willem-Alexander Inauguration Medal
- Pakistan: Grand Cross of the Order of the Crescent of Excellence
- Sweden: Member Grand Cross of the Royal Order of the Polar Star
- Sweden: Recipient of the 70th Birthday Badge Medal of King Carl XVI Gustaf

=== Awards ===
- (Switzerland) (Ottoman Empire) International Red Cross and Red Crescent Movement: Recipient of the 'Abu Bakr Al Sadik Medal'

==== Foreign awards ====
- Canada: Honorary Degree of Doctor of Laws of the University of New Brunswick
- United Kingdom: Honorary Degree of the University of Bath
