= Subhan Jabrayilov =

Azerbaijani military officer (1983–2020)

- Native name: Sübhan Rahim oğlu Cəbrayılov
- Born: Subhan Rahim oglu Jabrayilov; October 23, 1983; Salyan, Azerbaijani SSR, Soviet Union
- Died: October 19, 2020 (aged 36) Gubadly District, Azerbaijan
- Buried: Sumgait Martyrs' Lane
- Allegiance: Azerbaijani Armed Forces
- Branch: Special Forces of Azerbaijan
- Service years: 2002–2020
- Rank: Non-commissioned officer
- Conflicts: Second Nagorno-Karabakh War †
- Awards: For Faultless Service Medal; Hero of the Patriotic War Medal

Subhan Rahim oglu Jabrayilov (Azerbaijani: Sübhan Rahim oğlu Cəbrayılov) was an Azerbaijani military officer, non-commissioned officer serving in the Azerbaijani Armed Forces. He had taken part in the 2020 Nagorno-Karabakh war, in which he was killed. He had received the title of the Hero of the Patriotic War for his service during the war.

== Early life ==
Subhan Rahim oglu Jabrayilov was born on 23 October 1983, in Salyan District of the Azerbaijan SSR, which was then part of the Soviet Union.

== Military service ==
Subhan Jabrayilov started his military career in 2002. He was a non-commissioned officer (Azerbaijani: Baş gizir) serving in the Land Forces of the Azerbaijani Armed Forces.

Subhan Jabrayilov fought for the freedom of Fuzuli, Zangilan and Gubadli during the 2020 Nagorno-Karabakh war which started on 27 September.

He was killed on 19 October in the battles for Gubadly.

== Awards ==
- Jabrayilov was awarded the title of the Hero of the Patriotic War on 9 December 2020, by the decree of the President Aliyev.
- Jabrayilov was awarded the "For Fatherland" Medal on 9 December 2020, by the decree of the President Aliyev.
- Jabrayilov was awarded the For the Liberation of Jabrayil Medal on 24 December 2020, by the decree of the President Aliyev.

== See also ==
- Anar Aliyev
