= Salma Sobhan =

Bangladeshi lawyer and sister of Princess Sarvath Al Hassan

- সালমা সোবহান
- Born: Salma Rasheeda Akhtar Banu; 11 August 1937; London, United Kingdom
- Died: 30 December 2003 (aged 66); Gulshan, Dhaka, Bangladesh
- Education: University of Cambridge
- Spouse: Rehman Sobhan (m. 1962)
- Parent(s): Mohammed Ikramullah (father); Shaista Suhrawardy Ikramullah (mother)
- Relatives: Muhammad Hidayatullah (uncle); Huseyn Shaheed Suhrawardy (cousin); Princess Sarvath (sister); Naz Ikramullah (sister)

Salma Sobhan (née Rasheda Akhtar Banu; 11 August 1937 – 30 December 2003) was a Bangladeshi lawyer, academic and human rights activist. She became the first woman barrister in Pakistan in 1959. A member of the law faculty of the University of Dhaka, she was a co-founder of Ain-O-Salish Kendra (ASK), a national human rights watchdog. She was also a key figure at the Bangladesh Institute of Law and International Affairs (BILIA).

== Background ==
Sobhan was born in London in 1937. Her father, Mohammed Ikramullah, was the first foreign secretary of Pakistan. Her mother, Begum Shaista Suhrawardy Ikramullah, was one of the first two women members of Pakistan's Constituent Assembly, and later served as Pakistan's delegate to the UN and Ambassador to Morocco.

Her mother was a member of the Suhrawardy family of Calcutta. On her mother's side, Sobhan was a cousin of Huseyn Shaheed Suhrawardy, premier of Bengal and Prime Minister of Pakistan, and on her father's side she was a niece of Muhammad Hidayatullah, Vice President and Chief Justice of India.

She was married to Rehman Sobhan, an economist, in 1962. They had three sons; their eldest son Taimur died in an accident at the age of 18 in 1981. Their elder son Babar works for UNDP and their younger son Zafar Sobhan is the editor-in-chief of the Bangladeshi English daily, the Dhaka Tribune. Sobhan's sister is Princess Sarvath of Jordan. She had a brother named Enam and another sister named Naz.

== Education and early career ==
Sobhan was educated at Westonbirt School in England and studied law at Girton College, Cambridge, in 1958. She was called to the bar from Lincoln's Inn in 1959 and became one of Pakistan's first women barristers. She began working with a law firm in Karachi, M/S Surridge & Beecheno, as a legal assistant to practice in the High Court. After her marriage in 1962, she moved to Dhaka and began teaching in the law faculty at the University of Dhaka and served until 1981. In 1974, she was appointed research fellow at the Bangladesh Institute of Law and International Affairs. She was responsible for editing the Supreme Court Law Reports.

== Human rights and law career ==
Sobhan, along with eight other colleagues, had founded a human rights organization, Ain O Shalish Kendra, in 1986. She served as the executive director of the organization until 2001. For her dedication to the defense of women's rights, she received the Ananya Magazine Award in 2000 and an award from the New York-based Lawyers' Committee for Human Rights (later known as Human Rights First) in 2001. Sobhan was elected to the Board of the Bangladesh Legal Aid and Service Trust (BLAST), as well as that of Bangladesh Rural Advancement Committee (BRAC) and Nijera Kori. In 2001, she was elected to the Board of the United Nations Research Institute For Social Development (UNRISD). She was also a member of three international feminist networks: Asia Pacific Women Law and Development, Women Living under Muslim Laws, and Match Canada.

== Death ==
Salma Sobhan’s health started deteriorating in late 2003 after she was diagnosed with heart failure. On 30 December 2003 around midnight she suffered a heart attack and died on the way to the hospital.

== Publications ==
Sobhan's publications include Legal Status of Women in Bangladesh (1975), Peasants' Perception of Law (1981), No Better Option? Women Industrial Workers (co-authored in 1988).

== Legacy ==
The Protichi Foundation started by Amartya Sen has instituted an award for journalists in her name.
