= Subhan Ali Khan Kamboh =

Subhan Ali Khan Kamboh (born 1766) was an Indian Muslim scholar.

== Life ==
Kamboh specialized in logic, philosophy, literature and Qur'anic exegesis, hadis and fiqh. He also learnt English and Hebrew languages.

He was closely associated with Shaikh Ali Hazin. He wielded influence in Awadh and is said to have been the de facto Prime Minister during Roshan ud Din's Prime Minisrship.

Mirza Ghalib received an invitation to a reception in audience by the ruler's Deputy Prime Minister i.e. Subhan Ali Kamboh but the meeting did not happen because Mirza Ghalib stipulated two pre-conditions to his meeting with the formers: (1), that he be granted 'due honor' and (2), that he should be 'excused from making the customary peshkash '. Benefactors did not like pre-conditions being laid down by the supplicants hence the meeting failed.
