= Subhanpur, Ranga Reddy =

Subhanpur
- Village
- Location in Telangana, India Subhanpur (India)
- Coordinates: 17.1013°N 78.3481°E
- Country: India
- State: Telangana
- District: Ranga Reddy
- Time zone: UTC+5:30 (IST)

Sudhanpur is a village in Maheswaram mandal, Ranga Reddy district, in the Indian state of Telangana.
