= Farooq Sobhan =

Bangladeshi diplomat

- ফারুক সোবহান
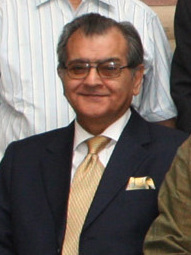
- Sobhan at Rashtrapati Bhavan in New Delhi (2012)

High Commissioner of Bangladesh to India
- In office 19 May 1992 – 28 February 1995
- Preceded by: Faruq Ahmed Choudhury
- Succeeded by: C. M. Shafi Sami

Personal details
- Born: 17 September 1940 (age 86) Calcutta, Bengal Province, British India
- Relatives: Rehman Sobhan (brother)
- Education: St. Paul's School, Darjeeling University of Dhaka; University of Oxford

Farooq Sobhan (born 17 September 1940) is a former Bangladeshi diplomat. He served in various capacities in the Bangladesh government and foreign service. He was Bangladesh's Ambassador to the People's Republic of China (1987–1990) and High Commissioner to Malaysia (1984–1987) and the Republic of India (1992–1995) as well as the Foreign Secretary of Bangladesh (1995–1997).

== Early life and career ==
Sobhan was born in 1940 in Calcutta during British rule into an aristocratic Bengali Muslim family of Khandakars. He did his schooling in St. Paul's School, Darjeeling. He attended the University of Dhaka and the University of Oxford before joining the Foreign Service of Pakistan. He is also the younger brother of Rehman Sobhan, an economist.

Sobhan also served as the chairman of the Board of Investment in with rank and status of a State Minister. As of 2022, Sobhan is the president of the Bangladesh Enterprise Institute, a private think-tank in the country that focuses on private sector development.

Sobhan was executive chairman, Board of Investment and special envoy to the Prime Minister from 1997 to 1999. He served as chairman of the Group of 77 at the UN 1982–1983, and was chairman, UN Commission on TNCs (transnational corporations) from 1991 to 1992. He is a member of the Board of Governors of the South Asia Centre for Policy Studies, based in Kathmandu and was co-chairman of the Coalition for South Asian Co- operation from 1994 to 2001.

Sobhan was a visiting professor at the Elliott School for International Affairs at George Washington University in 2003, where he taught a post-graduate course on South Asia. He is the chairman of the board of trustees of the independent CSR Centre, an organization focused on corporate social responsibility, established in Dhaka in September 2007. He is the chairman of an advisory committee on counter terrorism established in 2006, which includes senior officials of the government.

Sobhan's publications include a book entitled Opportunities for South-South Co-operation and as co-author, Shaping South Asia’s Future: Role of Regional Co-operation.

=== Election for Secretary-General position ===
Sobhan was the principal challenger for Commonwealth Secretary-General when Don McKinnon was elected at the 1999 Commonwealth Heads of Government Meeting. He stood on a platform of changing the emphasis of the Commonwealth Ministerial Action Group from infringements on the Commonwealth's democratic principles to 'any economic or environmental crisis'. The result of the vote (which remains secret), is said to have been thirty-six votes for McKinnon to sixteen for Sobhan, although, continuing the pattern set for Chief Emeka Anyaoku at the 1989 CHOGM, the result was announced as 'unanimous'.
