= Shaista Suhrawardy Ikramullah =

Pakistani diplomat (1915–2000)

Shaista Ikramullah NI
- শায়েস্তা ইকরামউল্লাহ (Bengali) شائستہ اکرام الله (Urdu)
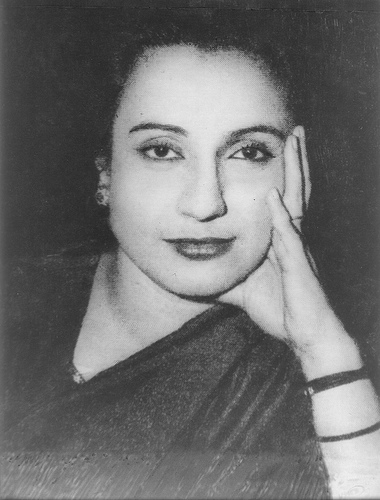
- Portrait of Shaista Suhrawardy

Member of the Constituent Assembly of Pakistan
- In office 10 August 1947 – 24 October 1954
- Constituency: East Bengal

Personal details
- Born: 22 July 1915 Calcutta, Bengal, British India
- Died: 11 December 2000 (aged 85) Karachi, Sindh, Pakistan
- Spouse: Mohammed Ikramullah (m. 1933; died 1963)
- Children: Inam Ikramullah; Naz Ikramullah; Salma Ikramullah; Sarvath Ikramullah
- Parent: Hassan Suhrawardy (father)
- Education: University of Calcutta (B.A); SOAS, University of London (Ph.D)
- Occupation: Politician, diplomat, writer

Begum Shaista Suhrawardy Ikramullah (22 July 1915 – 11 December 2000) was a Pakistani politician, diplomat and author. She joined the Pakistani foreign service in 1948, and was the country's first female civil servant, as well as the first Muslim woman to earn a PhD from the University of London. She was Pakistan's ambassador to Morocco from 1964 to 1967, and a delegate to the United Nations, calling for a more gender-inclusive language in the Universal Declaration of Human Rights.

== Family and education ==
Ikramullah was born as Shaista Akhtar Banu Suhrawardy into the Suhrawardy family to Hassan Suhrawardy and his wife Sahibzadi Shah Banu Begum. Shah Banu Begum was the daughter of Nawab Syed Muhammad Azad and maternal granddaughter of Nawab Abdul Latif.

She studied at Loreto College, Kolkata. She was also the first Muslim woman to earn a PhD from the University of London. Her doctorate thesis, "Development of the Urdu Novel and Short Story", was a critical survey of Urdu literature.

== Marriage and children ==
She married Mohammed Ikramullah in 1933. They had four children:

- Inam Ikramullah
- Naz Ashraf
- Salma Sobhan
- Princess Sarvath of Jordan

== Political career ==
After her marriage, she was one of the first Indian Muslim women in her generation to leave purdah. Muhammad Ali Jinnah inspired her to be involved in politics. She was a leader in the Muslim Women Students' Federation and the All-India Muslim League's Women's Sub-Committee.

In 1945, she was asked by the Government of India to attend the Pacific Relations Conference. Jinnah convinced her not to accept the offer, as he wanted her to go as the representative of the Muslim League and to speak on its behalf.

She was elected to the Constituent Assembly of India in 1946, but never took the seat, as Muslim League politicians did not.

She was one of two female representatives at the first Constituent Assembly of Pakistan in 1947.

In a debate in the Constituent Assembly in 1948, she highlighted feeling of exclusion of the people of East Bengal by saying:

A feeling is growing among the East Pakistanis that Eastern Pakistan is being neglected and treated merely as a colony of West Pakistan.[10]

She was also a delegate to the United Nations, and worked on the Universal Declaration of Human Rights (1948) and the Convention Against Genocide (1951).

She was Pakistan's ambassador to Morocco from 1964 to 1967.

== Publications ==
She wrote for Tehzeeb-e-Niswan and Ismat, both Urdu women's magazines, and later wrote for English-language newspapers. In 1950 her collection of short stories, called Koshish-e-Natamaam, was published. In 1951 her book Letters to Neena was published; it is a collection of ten open letters supposedly written to Indians, who are personified as a woman called Neena. The real Neena was one of her in-laws. After the Partition of India, she wrote about Islam for the government, and those essays were eventually published as Beyond the Veil (1953). Her autobiography, From Purdah to Parliament (1963), is her best-known writing; she translated it into Urdu to make it more accessible. In 1991 her book Huseyn Shaheed Suhrawardy: A Biography, about her uncle, was published. She also was one of the eight writers of the book Common Heritage (1997), about India and Pakistan. In her last days, she completed an English translation of Mirat ul Uroos and an Urdu volume on Kahavat aur Mahavray. In 2005 her collection of women's sayings and idioms in Urdu, called Dilli ki khavatin ki kahavatain aur muhavare, was posthumously published. She also wrote Safarnama, in Urdu.

== Death ==
She died on 11 December 2000, in Karachi, at age 85.

== Awards and recognition ==
In 2002, President of Pakistan posthumously gave her the country's highest civil award, the Nishan-i-Imtiaz (Order of Excellence).
