= Subhanpur, Nawada =

Subhanpur
- Village
- Country: India
- State: Bihar
- District: Nawada
- Metro: Nawada district

Languages
  - Official: Hindi
- Time zone: UTC+5:30 (IST)
- ISO 3166 code: IN-BR
- Website: http://subhanpur.com/

Subhanpur village is located in Kashi Chak Tehsil of Nawada district in Bihar, India. It is situated 6 km away from sub-district headquarter Kashi Chak and 40 km away from the district headquarter Nawada. As per 2009 stats, Subhanpur village is itself a gram panchayat. According to 2011 census information the location code or village code of Subhanpur village is 257666.

The total geographical area of village is 290 hectares. Subhanpur has a total population of 1,459. There are about 260 houses in Subhanpur village. Warisaliganj is the nearest town to Subhanpur which is approximately 12 km away.

== Geographical location ==
Subhanpur is a village in Kashichak Tehsil in Nawada District of Bihar, India. It is located 36 km south-west of the district headquarter Nawada, 48 km from Bihar Sharif, and 120 km from the state capital Patna. Subhanpur Pin code is 805124, and the postal head office is Bhatta. The nearest villages are Tharpos (1 km south), Bhatta (0.8 km north), Dhota (2 km east), Uprama (2 km), Dihri (2.2 km west ), and Dhanpur (1.8 km west). The nearest cities are Bihar Sharif, Nawada, Lakhisarai, Begusarai, Gaya, and Jahanabad.

== Language ==
Hindi is the local Language in Subhanpur.

== Population ==
Subhanpur is a medium size village located in Nawada district, Bihar with total 118 families residing. The Subhanpur village has population of 1,459 of which 807 are males while 652 are females as per Population Census 2011.

In Subhanpur village the population of children with age 0-6 is 148 which makes up 6.97% of total population of village. The average sex ratio of Subhanpur village is 10:8 (Male:Female). Child sex ratio for the Subhanpur as per census is 846, equal to the Bihar average of 846. Subhanpur village has a higher literacy rate compared to other villages in Bihar. In 2011, the literacy rate of Subhanpur village was 62.02% compared to 43.85% in nearby villages. In Subhanpur, male literacy stands at 88.05% while the female literacy rate was 79.72%.

As per the constitution of India and Panchyati Raaj Act, Subhanpur village is administrated by a Sarpanch (Head of Village) and a Mukhiya who are elected representatives of village.

Out of the total population of Subhanpur village, 908 were engaged in work activities. 84% of working population were involved in marginal activity providing livelihood for more than 2 years. 200 workers out of 908 engaged in main work, 596 were cultivators (owner or co-owner) while 112 were agricultural labourers.

== Local business ==
The majority of the population work in agriculture and livestock farming.

=== Rice Mill ===
- Maa Chandi Rice Mill: paddy, Rice, husk, bran

=== Agricultural products ===
- Crops: wheat, rice, gram, sugarcane, mustard, masoor, makai, arhar
- Fruit: mango, guava, banana, papaya, ber and jamoon

=== Animal products ===
- Cow and buffalo milk
- Poultry farming
- Breeding of cattle, goats, and working horses

== Connectivity of Subhanpur ==
Type	Status
Public Bus Service	Available within village
Private Bus Service	Available within village
Railway Station	Available within 5 km distance

== Nearby villages of Subhanpur ==
- Daula Chak
- Bauri
- Dhanpur
- Milki Chak
- Dihri
- Dhanpur Chak
- Sikandarpur
- Bhagwatpur
- Kunanpur
- Thalpos
- Barhauna
