= Subhanpura =

Coordinates: 22.3217°N 73.1550°E

Subhanpura is an urban area in the western side of Vadodara City, in the state of Gujarat, in India. Its PIN code is 390023.

It was a small village, which has merged with the ever growing western part of Vadodara city. Subhanpura is largely residential with a few shopping malls and cinemas. The Subhanpura Jain Sangha is in the western part of the area.

The majority of the population are workers from the nearby Gujarat Refinery and Indian Petrochemicals Corporation Limited.
