= Subhanpur, Kapurthala =

Subhanpur
- Village
- Interactive map of Subhanpur
- Coordinates: 31.466691°N 75.407152°E
- Country: India
- State: Punjab
- District: Kapurthala
- Metro: Kapurthala district

Languages
  - Official: Punjabi
- Time zone: UTC+5:30 (IST)
- ISO 3166 code: IN-PB
- Vehicle registration: PB-09

Subhanpur is a village in Punjab, India. It is a gram panchayat and falls under Kapurthala taluk, Kapurthala district. It is about 13 km from Kapurthala. The total geographical area of Subhanpur is about 101 hectares. The nearest town is Dhilwan and the village has 116 households as per 2011 census. It has more female population (280) than males (265) as per 2011 census.
