= Mohammed Ikramullah =

Pakistani diplomat and politician

Mohammad Ikramullah Hilal-e-Pakistan, KCMG (hon), CIE
- محمد اکرام اللہ
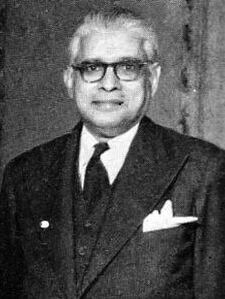
- Born: 15 January 1903; Bhopal, Bhopal State, British India
- Died: 12 September 1963 (aged 60); Karachi, West Pakistan, Pakistan
- Spouse: Shaista Suhrawardy (m. 1933)
- Children: Inam Ikramullah; Naz Ikramullah; Salma Ikramullah; Sarvath Ikramullah

Mohammad Ikramullah (Urdu: محمد اکرام اللہ; 15 January 1903 – 12 September 1963) was a figure in the administration of Pakistan at the time of independence of Pakistan on 14 August 1947. As a member of the provisional government of Pakistan, before the independence, he was Secretary and Advisor at the Ministries of Commerce, Information and Broadcasting, Commonwealth Relations and Foreign Affairs. He was also a member of Muslim League partition committee and a close companion of Quaid-e-Azam Muhammad Ali Jinnah.

After independence, he was appointed the first Foreign Secretary of Pakistan in 1947 by Jinnah himself. He also remained the Ambassador of Pakistan to Canada, France, Portugal and the United Kingdom. He was married to Shaista Suhrawardy Ikramullah, and father of Princess Sarvath of Jordan.

== Biography ==
Ikramullah was born 15 January 1903 in Bhopal, British India, to Urdu-speaking Quraishi family. His father, Khan Bahadur Hafiz Mohammed Wilayatullah belonged to the aristocracy of the Muslim royal state of Bhopal, a large princely state in India. His family is reputed to have hailed originally from the Hijaz and are regarded as both Quraishi and Chishti. Wilayatullah's family served against many significant royal posts for several generations at the Court of the state of Bhopal; where Ikramullah was born in 1903. He joined the Indian Civil Service in 1927. Later, Ikramullah served as Advisor to the preparatory commissions of the United Nations in London and San Francisco, and at its first general assembly, between 1945 and 1946. He was appointed a CIE (Companion of the Order of the Indian Empire) in the 1946 New Year Honours.

In July 1947, when the States Departments were established, Ikramullah was appointed from the old Indian Civil Service as Joint Secretary, States Department, Provisional government of British India prior to independence. Subsequent to the creation of Pakistan in 1947, he immigrated from Bhopal to Karachi, the then federal capital of Pakistan and started the foreign office, Government of Pakistan after being appointed the foreign Secretary of Pakistan by the founder of Pakistan Muhammad Ali Jinnah in October 1947. During the subsequent era, he represented Pakistan in the United Nations many times and also served as the High Commissioner of Pakistan to Canada and the UK, and also as Pakistan's ambassador to Portugal and France. Ikramullah played key roles in establishing the Commonwealth Economic Committee and had been nominated as Secretary-General of the Commonwealth at the time of his death in 1963.

=== Personal life ===
His younger brother, Mohammad Hidayatullah, was Chief Justice of India from 1968 to 1970, Vice President of India from 1979 to 1984, and served as acting President of India twice.

Ikramullah married Shaista Suhrawardy in 1933. He died in 1963.

Diplomatic posts
Preceded by Post established	Foreign Secretary of Pakistan; 1947–1951	Succeeded by Mirza Osman Ali Baig
Preceded by Sikandar Ali Baig	Foreign Secretary of Pakistan (2nd term); 1959–1961	Succeeded by S.K. Dehlavi
