= Amman Baccalaureate School =

Location
- Al Hijaz Street, Dabouq, PO Box 441; Sweileh; Amman, Jordan 11910; Jordan

Information
- Type: Private
- Motto: Let's go Stallions
- Religious affiliation: All
- Established: 1981
- Chairperson: Princess Sumaya bint Hassan
- Enrollment: 1160
- Colors: Black, grey, white, and maroon
- Mascot: Stanley the Stallion
- Website: abs.edu.jo

The Amman Baccalaureate School is a private, fee-paying school and nonprofit organization, licensed by the Jordanian Ministry of Education. It is a coeducational day school and offers the IB Primary Years Programme, and the IB Middle Years Programme, its students for the International Baccalaureate Diploma and IB Career-related programme as school-leaving qualifications. The school is situated on the west side of Amman in Jordan and was established in 1981 by the Hashemite Society for Education, a charitable society registered with the Ministry of Social Development. Its educational and administrative policies are set by the school's Board of Trustees, chaired by Princess Sarvath al-Hassan, with Princess Sumaya bint Hassan serving as Deputy Chair.

== Accreditation ==
The school is accredited by the Council of International Schools and the New England Association of Schools and Colleges, receiving reaccreditation from the latter in 2025. It is also a regional member of the Round Square Conference of Schools.

== Facilities ==
Each school section has its facilities which include labs, ICT rooms, and playgrounds. There is a sports complex and a track and field stadium. The art department displays paintings by celebrity artists. The school has a theater that can seat four hundred.

== Students and faculty ==
Student enrollment is currently around 1160, with over 180 teaching and ancillary staff. 14 nationalities are represented amongst the student population.

== Activities ==
Various student clubs and sports teams are part of the school's student life, as well as a large number of conferences such as the Model United Nations. In 2010 the Model United Nations Club at the Amman Baccalaureate School was accredited and officially became THIMUN affiliated. The Amman Model United Nations conference is located in the Amman Baccalaureate School. A student council acts as a mediator between the student body and the administration.

== Sources ==
- Bosberry-Scott, Wendy (2012). IB World Schools Yearbook 2012. John Catt Educational Ltd. p. 70. ISBN 978-1-908095-35-0.
