= Mohammad Hidayatullah =

Vice President of India from 1979 to 1984

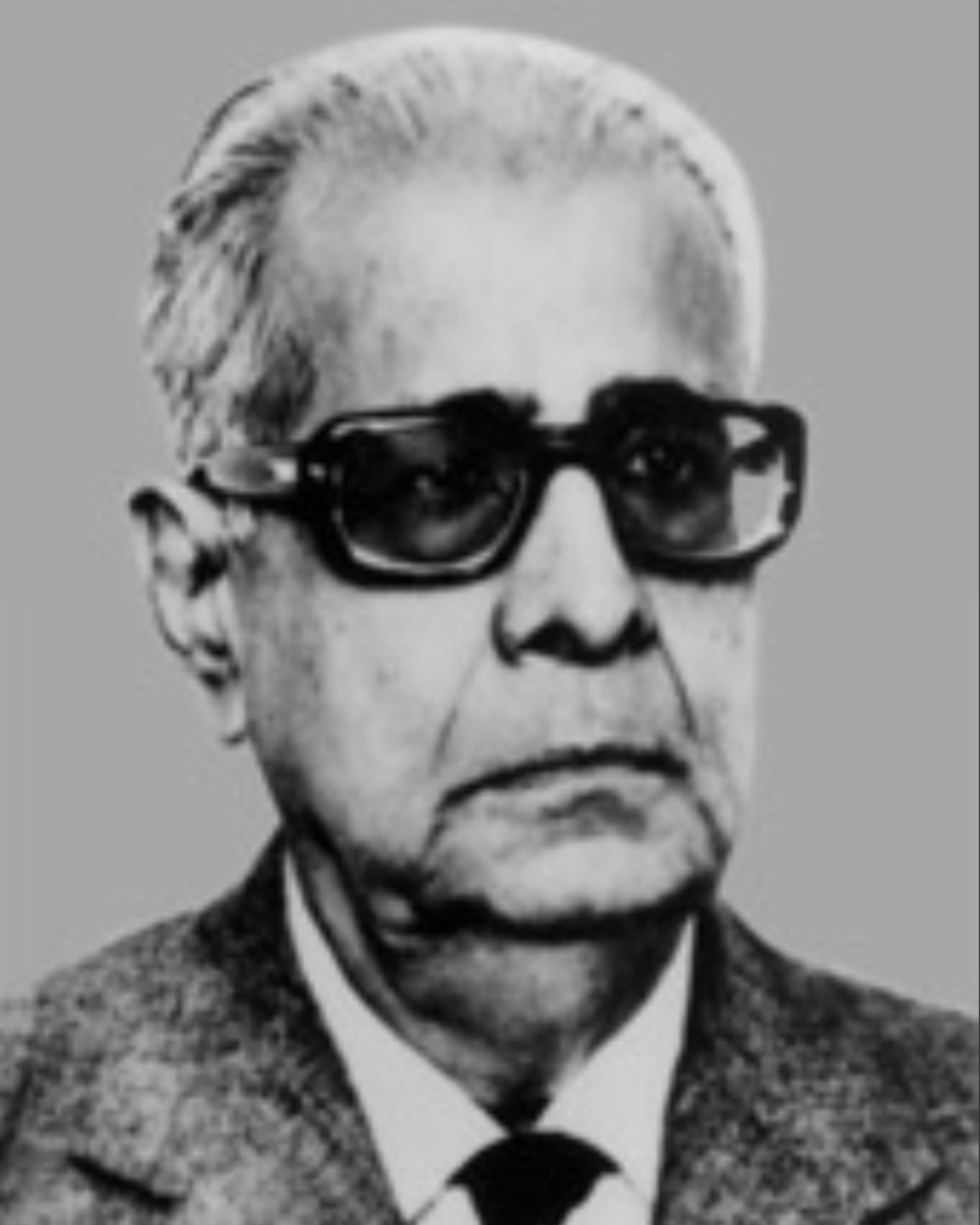
- Portrait, c. 1980

Acting (interim) President of India
- Interim; 20 July 1969 – 24 August 1969
- Prime Minister: Indira Gandhi
- Vice President: Vacant
- Preceded by: V. V. Giri (interim)
- Succeeded by: V. V. Giri

Vice President of India
- In office 31 August 1979 – 30 August 1984
- President: Neelam Sanjiva Reddy; Zail Singh
- Prime Minister: Charan Singh; Indira Gandhi
- Preceded by: B. D. Jatti
- Succeeded by: Ramaswamy Venkataraman

Chief Justice of India
- In office 25 February 1968 – 16 December 1970
- Appointed by: Zakir Husain
- Preceded by: Kailas Nath Wanchoo
- Succeeded by: J. C. Shah

Judge of the Supreme Court of India
- In office 1 December 1958 – 24 February 1968
- Nominated by: Sudhi Ranjan Das
- Appointed by: Rajendra Prasad

Chief Justice of Madhya Pradesh High Court
- In office 1 November 1956 – 30 November 1958
- Appointed by: Rajendra Prasad
- Preceded by: Office established
- Succeeded by: Ganesh Prasad Bhutt

Chief Justice of Nagpur High Court
- In office 3 December 1954 – 31 October 1956
- Appointed by: Rajendra Prasad
- Preceded by: B. P. Sinha
- Succeeded by: Office abolished

Judge of Nagpur High Court
- In office 27 June 1946 – 2 December 1954
- Appointed by: Lord Wavell
- Chief Justice: Frederick Louis Grille

Personal details
- Born: 17 December 1905 Betul, Central Provinces and Berar, British India (present-day Madhya Pradesh, India)
- Died: 18 September 1992 (aged 86) Bombay, Maharashtra, India (present-day Mumbai)
- Party: Independent
- Spouse: Pushpa Shah
- Education: Nagpur University; Trinity College, Cambridge; Lincoln's Inn
- Occupation: Lawyer; politician; academician

Mohammad Hidayatullah, (17 December 1905 – 18 September 1992) was an Indian jurist and statesman who served as interim President of India in 1969. He concurrently served as Chief Justice of India from 1968 to 1970 and then as Vice President of India from 1979 to 1984.

== Early life and education ==
Hidayatullah was born in 1905 in the well-known family of Khan Bahadur Hafiz Mohammed Wilayatullah. His grandfather Munshi Kudartullah was an advocate in Benares. His father was a poet of all-India repute who wrote poems in Urdu and it was probably from him that Justice Hidayatullah got his love for language and literature. Wilayatullah was Gold medallist of Aligarh Muslim University in 1897 - besting famous mathematician Sir Ziauddin Ahmad, a favourite of Sir Syed Ahmed Khan. Wilayatullah served in ICS until 1928 and as a member of the Central Legislative Assembly from 1929 to 1933. Hidaytullah's elder brothers Mohammed Ikramullah (ICS, later Foreign Secretary, Pakistan) and Ahmedullah (ICS, retired as Chairman, Tariff Board) were scholars as well as sportsmen. He on the other hand excelled in Urdu poetry.

After completing primary education at the Government High School of Raipur in 1922, Hidayatullah attended Morris College in Nagpur, where he was nominated as the Phillip's Scholar in 1926. When he graduated in 1926, he was awarded the Malak Gold Medal. Following the trend of Indians studying British law abroad, Hidayatullah attended Trinity College at the University of Cambridge from 1927 to 1930 and obtained B.A. and M.A. Degrees from there. Here he secured the 2nd order of merit and was awarded a gold medal for his performance in 1930. He was called to the Bar from Lincoln's Inn when he was just 25 years old. He was awarded LL.D. (Honoris Causa) from University of the Philippines and D. Litt. (Honoris Causa) from University of Bhopal (now Barkatullah University) and University of Kakatiya. While at Cambridge, Hidayatullah was elected and served as the President of the Indian Majlis in 1929. Also while here, he pursued English and Law Tripos from the renowned Lincoln's Inn. In addition he secured a place of Barrister-at-Law in 1930.

== Career ==
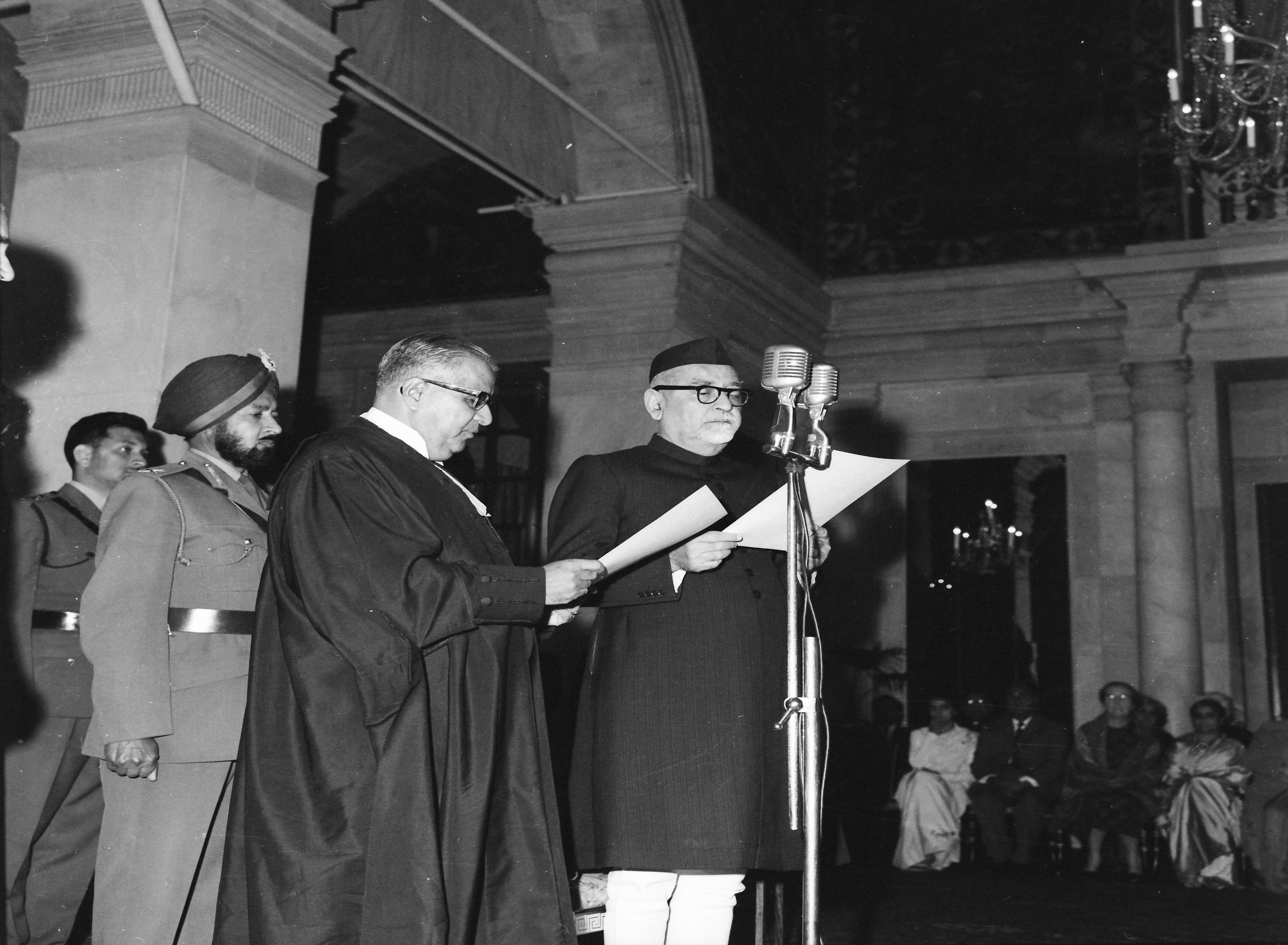
President Dr. Zakir Husain at the swearing in ceremony of Justice M. Hidayatullah, at Rashtrapati Bhavan

After graduation, Hidayatullah returned to India and enrolled as an advocate of the High Court of Central Provinces and Berar at Nagpur on 19 July 1930. He also taught Jurisprudence and Mahomedan Law in the University College of Law at Nagpur and was also the Extension Lecturer in English literature. On 12 December 1942, he was appointed Government Pleader in the High Court at Nagpur. On 2 August 1943, he became the Advocate General of Central Provinces and Berar (now Madhya Pradesh) and continued to hold the said post till he was appointed as an Additional Judge of that High Court in 1946. He had the distinction of being the youngest Advocate General of an Indian state, Madhya Pradesh.

On 27 June 1946, Hidayatullah was appointed as Additional Judge of that High Court of Central Provinces and Berar and on 13 September 1946 he was appointed as permanent judge of said High Court where he served until being elevated to Chief Justice of the Nagpur High Court in 1954 on 3 December 1954, being the youngest Chief Justice of a High Court. In November 1956, he was then appointed as the Chief Justice of Madhya Pradesh High Court. On 1 December 1958, he was elevated as a justice to the Supreme Court of India. In his time he was the youngest judge of the Supreme Court of India. After serving as a judge for nearly 10 years, he was appointed as the Chief Justice of India on 28 February 1968 – becoming the first Muslim Chief Justice of India.

He retired from this position on 16 December 1970. Over the course of his career on the Supreme Court, Hidayatullah authored 461 judgments and sat on 1,220 benches.

== President of India (1969) ==
During his term as the Chief Justice of India, the then-President of India, Zakir Husain died suddenly, while still in office, on 3 May 1969. Then Vice President of India Mr. V. V. Giri became the acting President. Later, Giri resigned from both offices as acting president and Vice-President to become a candidate in the 1969 Presidential Election. Hidayatullah then served as the President of India for a short period from 20 July to 24 August. The visit of President of the United States Richard Nixon to India made his presidential term historic.

=== Vice Presidential election ===
After his retirement, Hidayatullah was elected as the Vice-President of India by a consensus among different parties and occupied that high office with distinction from 1979 to August 1984. During his tenure as the Vice-President, he won the respect of all concerned for his impartiality and independence.

In 1982, when the then President Zail Singh went to the U.S. for medical treatment, Vice-President Hidayatullah officiated as president from 6 October 1982 to 31 October 1982. Thus, he officiated as acting president twice.

Hidayatullah was requested by certain leaders to contest for President in the 1982. He, however, declined politely, declined the offer, saying that contesting an election was inconsistent, both within personal values and public image.

Having served at all of these positions made Hidayatullah unique among other members of Indian history. He became the only person to have served in all three offices of Chief Justice of India, President of India, and the Vice President of India.

During his long tenure in the Supreme Court he was a party to a number of landmark judgments including the judgment in Golaknath v. State of Punjab which took the view that the Parliament had no power to cut down the Fundamental Rights by constitutional amendment. His judgment in the case of Ranjit D. Udeshi dealing with the law of obscenity, displayed a flair for literature and is particularly of note.

=== Career in Nagpur ===
Before being elevated as a judge to High Court, Hidayatullah was involved in local and state affairs. The following are some of the committee positions he held:

- Member of the Nagpur Municipal Committee (1931–1933)
- Member of the Nagpur University's Executive and Academic Councils (1934–1953)
- Member of the Nagpur Improvement Trust (1943–1945)
- Member of the Nagpur Bar Council (1943–1946)
- Chief Commissioner of the Madhya Pradesh Bharat Scouts and Guides (1950–1953)

Many of these positions, as well as those of High Court Justice were held prior to Indian Independence, they were all considered service to Great Britain, thus Hidayatullah was conferred the honour as an Officer of the Order of the British Empire by King George VI in the 1946 King's Birthday Honours.

=== Teaching and other associations ===
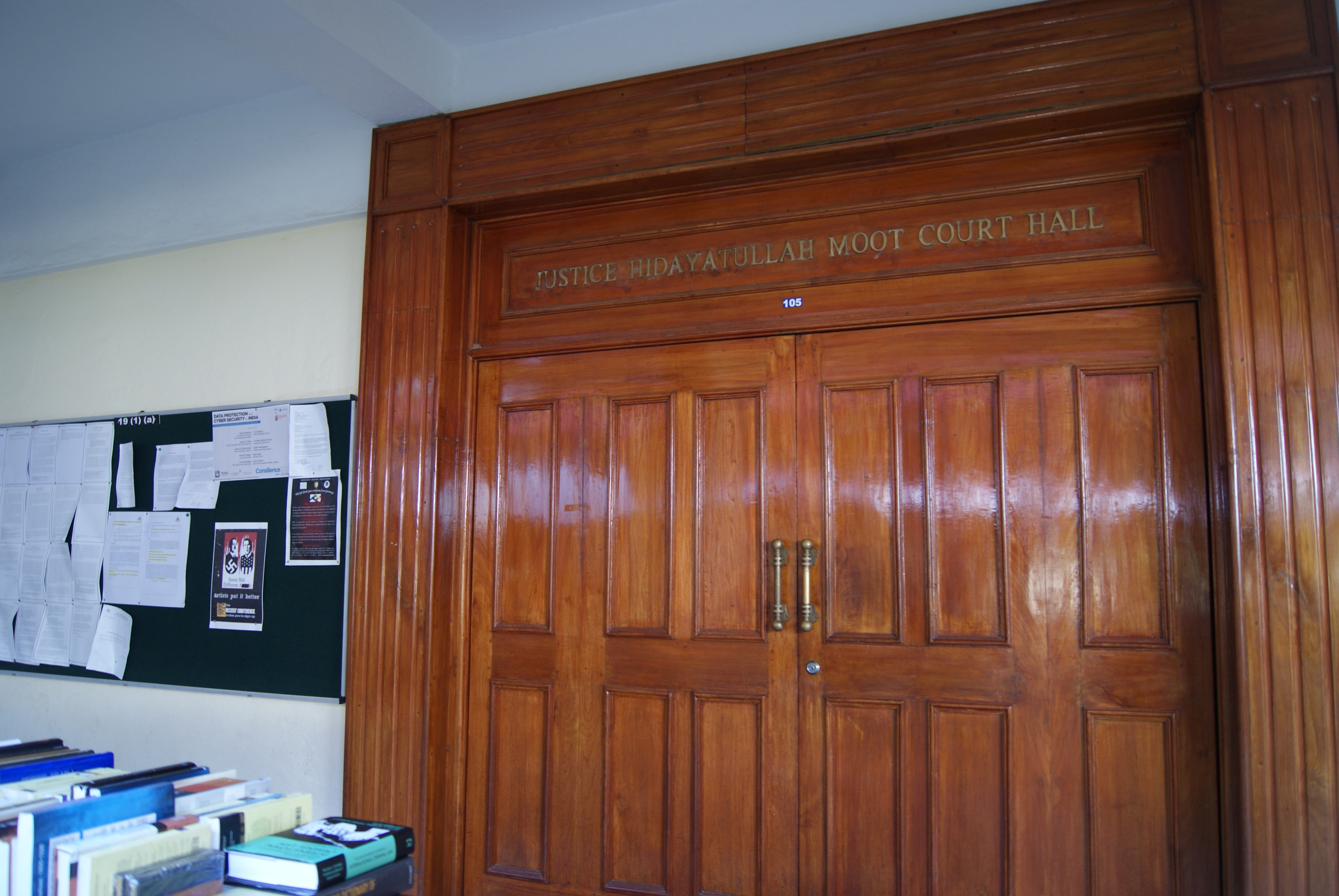
The entrance to the Justice Hidayatullah Moot Court Hall, named after Mohammad Hidayatullah, in the National Law School of India University in Bangalore

Having received an education at one of the premier legal institutions of the time, Hidayatullah was able to segue into an academic career not long after returning to India. In 1935, he took a teaching post at University College of Law, where he taught until 1943. Later he served as Dean of the Faculty of Law at Nagpur University from 1949 to 1953. In addition, he served as Faculty of Law at various other institutions throughout the 1950s: Sagar University, Court Vikram University, and the Aligarh Muslim University. He was Pro-Chancellor of the Delhi University from 1968 to 1970, Chancellor of the Jamia Millia Islamia from 1969 to 1985, Chancellor of the Delhi and Punjab Universities between 1979 and 1984 and Chancellor of the Hyderabad University from 1986 to 1990. He was the President of the Indian Law Institute from 1963 to 1970, President of the International Law Association (Indian Branch) from 1968 to 1970 and of the Indian Society of International Law in 1969–70.

He was, at one time, a Member of the Executive Council of the World Assembly of Judges and of the Managing Committee of the British Institute of International and Comparative Law. He was a Member of the International Council of Former Scouts and Guides, Brussels, and Chief Scout of the Boy Scouts Association of India. Post-retirement, Hidayatullah renewed his interest in Boy Scouts and served as Chief Scout of the All India Boy Scouts Association from 1982 to 1992. He held the posts of the President of Bombay Natural History Society and of the Patron of Schizophrenic Research Foundation of India and Commonwealth Society of India. He was also a Member of the World Association for Orphans and Abandoned Children and a Settlor of the Jawaharlal Nehru-Cambridge University Trust. He also represented India in International Conferences held in different countries and cities, such as, Washington, London, Geneva, Sydney, the Hague, Tokyo, Stockholm, Belgrade, Cairo and Bangkok.

=== Scholar and linguist ===
Hidayatullah was a scholar in Hindi, English, Urdu, Persian and French. He had working knowledge of some other Indian languages including Sanskrit and Bengali.

== Institutions ==
Hidayatullah was the president of Indian Law Institute, International Law Association (Indian Branch), Indian Society of International Law from 1968 to 1970. He also presided the Indian Red Cross Society in 1982. He was closely associated with Hunger Project of USA, World Association of Orphans and Abandoned Children (Geneva), and Independent Commission on International Humanitarian Issues (1982–84).

The Hidayatullah National Law University at Naya Raipur is named after him.

== Books ==
- Democracy in India and the Judicial Process, 1966 by Asia Publishing House (1967).
- The South-West Africa Case, Published 1967 by Asia Publishing House (1966).
- Judicial Methods Published for the Institute of Constitutional and Parliamentary Studies by National Publishing House (1970).
- A Judge's Miscellany, N. M. Tripathi (1972).
- USA and India: All India Reporter (1977).
- A Judge's Miscellany (Second Series) N. M. Tripathi(1972).
- The Fifth and Sixth Schedules to the Constitution of India, Ashok Pub. House
- My own Boswell (Autobiography) Arnold-Heinemann (1980).
- Editor, Mulla's Mohammedan Law
- Constitutional law of India: Bar Council of India Trust (1984).
- Right to property and the Indian Constitution: Calcutta University (1984).
- Justice Hidayatullah on commercial laws: Deep & Deep (1982).

== Awards and honours ==
=== National honours ===
- British India:
  - Order of the British Empire, Officer (1946)

=== Foreign honours ===
- Yugoslavia:
  - Order of Yugoslav Flag with Sash (1970)

=== Key to the City ===
- Manila, Philippines:
  - Key to the City (1971)

=== Other awards ===
- Medallion and Plaque of Merit Philconsa, Manila, 1970 and
- Knight of Mark Twain, 1971;
- Honoured with "Proud Past Alumni" in the list of 42 members, from "Allahabad University Alumni Association", NCR, Ghaziabad (Greater Noida) Chapter 2007-2008 registered under society act 1860 with registration no. 407/2000.
- Honorary Bencher of Lincoln's Inn, 1968; President of Honour, Inns of Courts Society, India.
- War Service Badge, 1948;
- Shiromani Award, 1986;
- Architects of India Award, 1987;
- Dashrathmal Singhvi Memorial Award of the Banaras Hindu University.

Between 1970 and 1987, as many as 12 Indian universities and the University of the Philippines conferred upon him the honorary degree of Doctor of Law or Doctor of Literature.

== Legacy ==
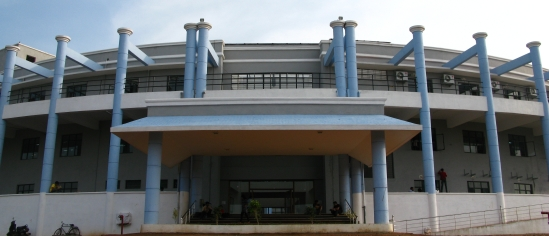
Hidayatullah National Law University

In his honour, the Hidayatullah National Law University was established in 2003, in his home town of Raipur, in the state of Chhattisgarh. University also organises Justice Hidayatullah Memorial National Moot Court Competition (HNMCC), which was rebranded to Justice Hidayatullah Memorial International Moot Court Competition (HIMCC) in 2024, in his memory.

== Personal life ==
In 1948, Hidayatullah married Pushpa Shah, who was from a Jain family. Her father's name was A. N. Shah who was chairman of the Income Tax Appellate Tribunal. She was the eldest daughter in her family. She married Hidayatullah on 5 May 1948.

Their son, Arshad Hidayatullah, is a Senior Counsel at the Supreme Court of India.

== See also ==
- Chief Justice of India
- President of India
- Hidayatullah National Law University

Legal offices
Preceded by Kailas Nath Wanchoo	Chief Justice of India; 1968–1970	Succeeded by Jayantilal Chhotalal Shah
Political offices
Preceded by Varahagiri Venkata Giri; Acting	President of India; Acting; 1969	Succeeded by Varahagiri Venkata Giri
Preceded by Basappa Danappa Jatti	Vice President of India; 1979–1984	Succeeded by Ramaswamy Venkataraman
