= List of guests at the enthronement of Naruhito =

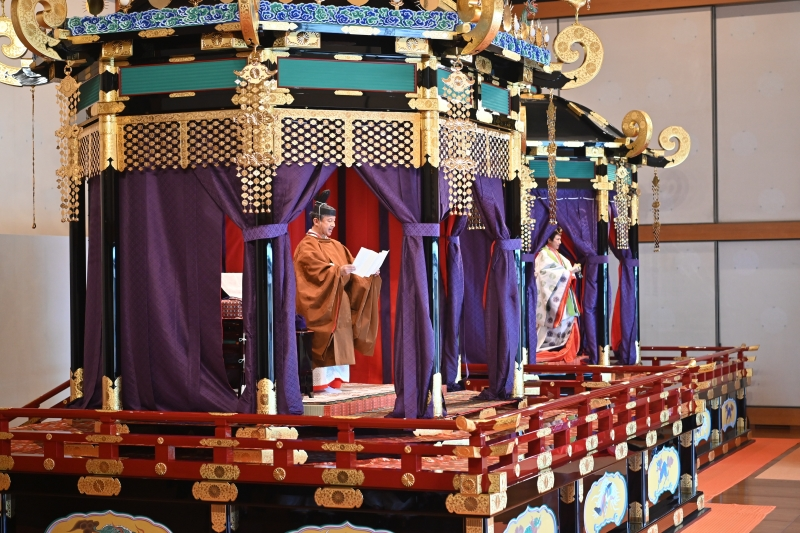
The Emperor and Empress during the enthronement ceremony

The enthronement of Emperor Naruhito and Empress Masako was attended by around 3,000 guests from Japan and abroad, who were present for a proclamation ceremony (Japanese: 即位礼正殿の儀, romanized: Sokui-Rei-Seiden-no-Gi) at the Tokyo Imperial Palace on 22 October 2019.

Representatives of 183 countries (out of 194 invited by the Japanese government) confirmed their attendance at the ceremony. They included 14 monarchs, 51 presidents and eight prime ministers. Visiting foreign guests were hosted at the Hotel New Otani in Tokyo, and were also invited to attend bilateral meetings with the concurrent prime minister, Shinzo Abe, and a state banquet hosted by the new emperor.

== Japan ==
=== Imperial Family ===
Descendants of Akihito

- The Crown Prince and Crown Princess Akishino, the Emperor's brother and sister-in-law
  - Princess Mako of Akishino, the Emperor's niece
  - Princess Kako of Akishino, the Emperor's niece
- Princess Sayako, Mrs Yoshiki Kuroda and Yoshiki Kuroda, the Emperor's sister and brother-in-law

Other descendants of Emperor Shōwa

- The Prince and Princess Hitachi, the Emperor's paternal uncle and aunt
- Princess Atsuko, Mrs Takamasa Ikeda, the Emperor's paternal aunt
- Princess Takako, Mrs Hisanaga Shimazu and Hisanaga Shimazu, the Emperor's paternal aunt and uncle

Other descendants of Emperor Taishō

- Princess Yasuko, Mrs Tadateru Konoe and Tadateru Konoe, the Emperor's first cousin once removed and her husband
- Princess Tomohito of Mikasa, widow of the Emperor's first cousin once removed
  - Princess Akiko of Mikasa, the Emperor's second cousin
  - Princess Yōko of Mikasa, the Emperor's second cousin
- Princess Masako, Mrs Sōshitsu Sen and Sōshitsu Sen XVI, the Emperor's first cousin once removed and her husband
- The Princess Takamado, widow of the Emperor's first cousin once removed
  - Princess Tsuguko of Takamado, the Emperor's second cousin
  - Princess Noriko, Mrs Kunimaro Senge, the Emperor's second cousin
  - Princess Ayako, Mrs Kei Moriya and Kei Moriya, the Emperor's second cousin and her husband

Owada family

- Hisashi and Yumiko Owada, the Empress's parents

=== Heads of the three branches of government ===
- Shinzo Abe, Prime Minister of Japan, and his wife Akie Abe
  - Yoshirō Mori, former Prime Minister of Japan (2000–2001)
  - Junichiro Koizumi, former Prime Minister of Japan (2001–2006)
  - Yasuo Fukuda, former Prime Minister of Japan (2007–2008)
  - Tarō Asō, former Prime Minister of Japan (2008–2009)
  - Yukio Hatoyama, former Prime Minister of Japan (2009–2010)
  - Naoto Kan, former Prime Minister of Japan (2010–2011)
  - Yoshihiko Noda, former Prime Minister of Japan (2011–2012)
- Tadamori Ōshima, Speaker of the House of Representatives
- Akiko Santō, President of the House of Councillors
- Naoto Ōtani, Chief Justice of the Supreme Court

== Other royalty ==
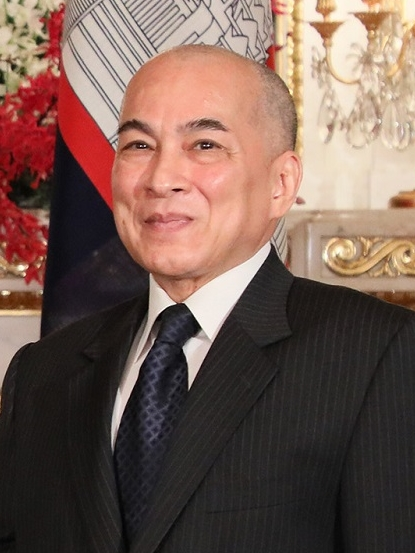
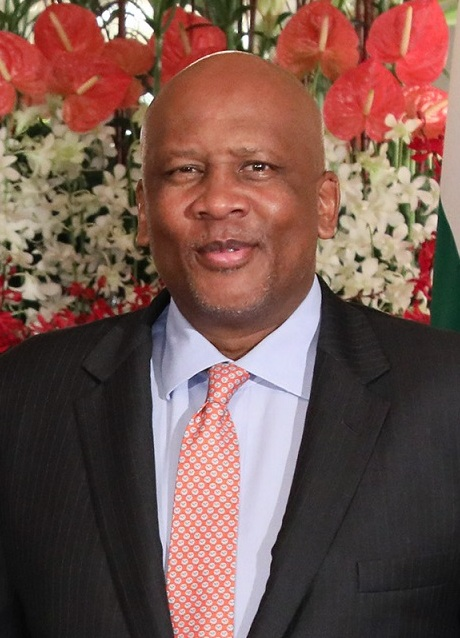
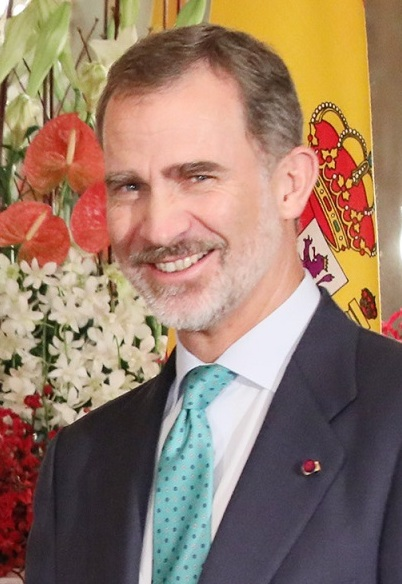
Thirteen reigning monarchs, including the Kings of Cambodia (left), Lesotho (middle) and Spain (right), attended the enthronement ceremony.
- The Crown Prince of Bahrain (representing the King of Bahrain)
  - Sheikh Salman bin Khalifa Al Khalifa of Bahrain
- The King and Queen of Belgium
- The King and Queen of Bhutan
- The Sultan of Brunei
  - Prince Abdul Mateen of Brunei
- The King of Cambodia
  - Princess Norodom Arunrasmy of Cambodia
- The Crown Prince and Crown Princess of Denmark (representing the Queen of Denmark)
- The King and Inkhosikati LaMashwama of Eswatini
- The Crown Prince of Jordan (representing the King of Jordan)
- Sheikh Nasser Al-Mohammed Al-Sabah, former Prime Minister of Kuwait (representing the Emir of Kuwait)
- The King and Queen of Lesotho
- The Hereditary Prince of Liechtenstein (representing the Prince of Liechtenstein)
- The Grand Duke of Luxembourg
- The Yang di-Pertuan Agong and Raja Permaisuri Agong of Malaysia
- The Prince of Monaco
- Prince Moulay Rachid of Morocco (representing the King of Morocco)
- The King and Queen of the Netherlands
- The Crown Prince of Norway (representing the King of Norway)
- Sayyid Asa'ad bin Tariq Al Said, Deputy Prime Minister of Oman (representing the Sultan of Oman)
- The Emir of Qatar
- Prince Turki bin Mohammed Al Saud of Saudi Arabia (representing the King of Saudi Arabia)
- The King and Queen of Spain
- The King of Sweden
  - The Crown Princess of Sweden
- The King and Queen of Tonga
- Sheikh Hazza bin Zayed Al Nahyan of Abu Dhabi (representing the President of the United Arab Emirates)
- The Prince of Wales (representing the Queen of the United Kingdom)

== International ==
=== Heads of state and government ===
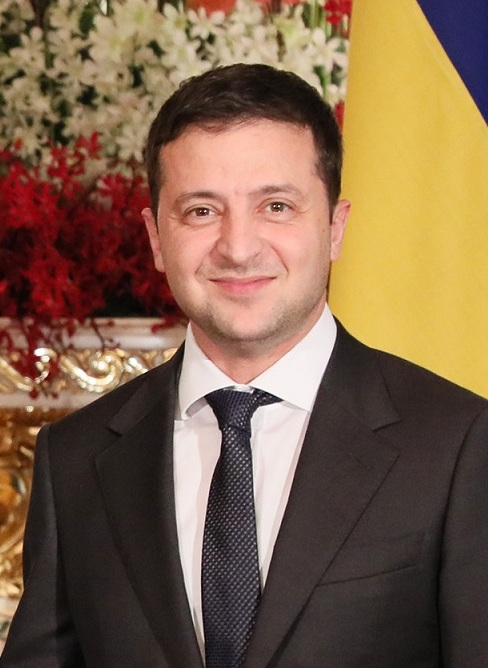
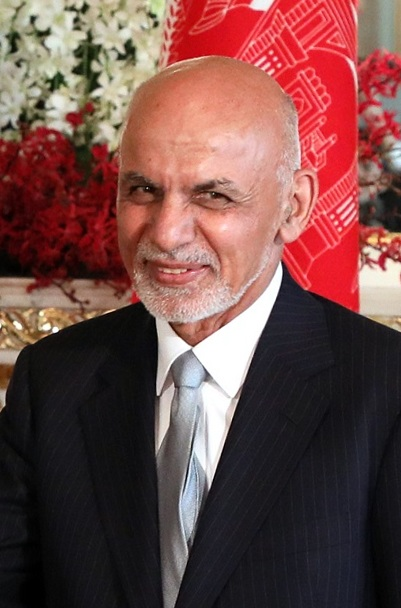
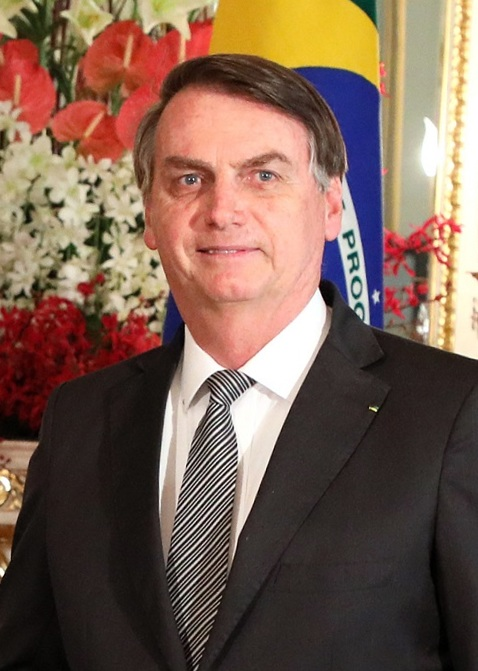
Ukrainian President Volodymyr Zelenskyy (left), Afghan President Ashraf Ghani (middle) and Brazilian President Jair Bolsonaro (right) attended the enthronement ceremony.
- (Islamic Republic of Afghanistan) Ashraf Ghani, President of Afghanistan, and First Lady Rula Ghani
- Ilir Meta, President of Albania
- Armen Sarkissian, President of Armenia, and First Lady Nouneh Sarkissian
- Alexander Van der Bellen, President of Austria, and First Lady Doris Schmidauer
- Mohammad Abdul Hamid, President of Bangladesh, and First Lady Rashida Hamid
- Patrice Talon, President of Benin
- Željko Komšić, Chairman of the Presidency of Bosnia and Herzegovina, and Sabina Komšić
- Jair Bolsonaro, President of Brazil
- Rumen Radev, President of Bulgaria, and First Lady Desislava Radeva
- Joseph Ngute, Prime Minister of Cameroon
- Jorge Carlos Fonseca, President of Cape Verde
- Azali Assoumani, President of the Comoros
- Andrej Babiš, Prime Minister of the Czech Republic, and Monika Herodesová
- Abdoulkader Kamil Mohamed, Prime Minister of Djibouti
- Kersti Kaljulaid, President of Estonia
- Jioji Konrote, President of Fiji, and First Lady Sarote Faga Konrote
- Sauli Niinistö, President of Finland, and First Lady Jenni Haukio
- (Georgia (country)) Salome Zourabichvili, President of Georgia
- Frank-Walter Steinmeier, President of Germany, and First Lady Elke Büdenbender
- Jimmy Morales, President of Guatemala, and First Lady Patricia Marroquín
- János Áder, President of Hungary, and First Lady Anita Herczegh
- Guðni Th. Jóhannesson, President of Iceland, and First Lady Eliza Reid
- Ram Nath Kovind, President of India, and First Lady Savita Kovind
- Alassane Ouattara, President of Ivory Coast, and First Lady Dominique Ouattara
- Uhuru Kenyatta, President of Kenya, and First Lady Margaret Kenyatta
- Hashim Thaçi, President of Kosovo
- Sooronbay Jeenbekov, President of Kyrgyzstan
- Egils Levits, President of Latvia, and First Lady Andra Levite
- Gitanas Nausėda, President of Lithuania, and First Lady Diana Nausėdienė
- Ibrahim Mohamed Solih, President of Maldives, and First Lady Fazna Ahmed
- George Vella, President of Malta, and First Lady Miriam Grima
- Hilda Heine, President of the Marshall Islands
- David Panuelo, President of the Federated States of Micronesia
- Igor Dodon, President of Moldova, and First Lady Galina Dodon
- Ukhnaagiin Khürelsükh, Prime Minister of Mongolia, and Luvsandorjiin Bolortsetseg
- Milo Đukanović, President of Montenegro, and First Lady Lidija Kuč
- Aung San Suu Kyi, State Councillor of Myanmar
- Lionel Aingimea, President of Nauru
- Bidya Devi Bhandari, President of Nepal
- Mahamadou Issoufou, President of Niger, and First Lady Aïssata Issoufou Mahamadou
- Arif Alvi, President of Pakistan, and First Lady Samina Alvi
- Mahmoud Abbas, President of Palestine
- Thomas Remengesau Jr., President of Palau
- Laurentino Cortizo, President of Panama, and First Lady Yazmín Colón de Cortizo
- Rodrigo Duterte, President of the Philippines, and partner Honeylet Avanceña
- Klaus Iohannis, President of Romania, and First Lady Carmen Iohannis
- Tuimalealiʻifano Vaʻaletoʻa Sualauvi II, O le Ao o le Malo of Samoa, and Masiofo Faʻamausili Leinafo
- Ana Brnabić, Prime Minister of Serbia
- Halimah Yacob, President of Singapore, and First Gentleman Mohammed Abdullah Alhabshee
- Zuzana Čaputová, President of Slovakia
- Borut Pahor, President of Slovenia
- Maithripala Sirisena, President of Sri Lanka, and First Lady Jayanthi Pushpa Kumari
- Prayut Chan-o-cha, Prime Minister of Thailand, and Naraporn Chan-o-cha
- Faure Gnassingbé, President of Togo
- Gurbanguly Berdimuhamedow, President of Turkmenistan
- Volodymyr Zelenskyy, President of Ukraine, and First Lady Olena Zelenska
- Nguyễn Xuân Phúc, Prime Minister of Vietnam

=== Deputies to heads of state ===
==== Governors-general ====
The governors-general represent the head of state in the Commonwealth realms (countries in personal union with the British monarch).

- Sir Rodney Williams, Governor-General of Antigua and Barbuda, and Sandra, Lady Williams
- General David Hurley, Governor-General of Australia
- Dame Sandra Mason, Governor-General of Barbados
- Sir Colville Young, Governor-General of Belize
- Sir Tom Marsters, Queen's Representative to the Cook Islands (Note: The Cook Islands is in free association with New Zealand, but is recognised by Japan as an independent state (see Foreign relations of the Cook Islands).)
- Dame Patsy Reddy, Governor-General of New Zealand
- Sir Bob Dadae, Governor-General of Papua New Guinea
- Dame Susan Dougan, Governor-General of Saint Vincent and the Grenadines
- Sir David Vunagi, Governor-General of Solomon Islands, and Mary, Lady Vunagi

==== Other ====
- Gabriela Michetti, Vice President of Argentina
- Wang Qishan, Vice President of the People's Republic of China, and Second Lady Yao Mingshan
- Roberto Morales Ojeda, Vice President of the Council of State of Cuba
- Otto Sonnenholzner, Vice President of Ecuador
- Félix Ulloa, Vice President of El Salvador
- Ma'ruf Amin, Vice President of Indonesia
- Lee Nak-yon, Prime Minister of South Korea
- Phankham Viphavanh, Vice President of Laos
- Hugo Velázquez Moreno, Vice President of Paraguay, and Second Lady Lourdes Samaniego González
- Vincent Meriton, Vice President of Seychelles

=== Former state leaders ===
- Eduardo Frei Ruiz-Tagle, former President of Chile (1994–2000), and former First Lady Marta Larraechea
- Mulatu Teshome, former President of Ethiopia (2013–2018)
- Nicolas Sarkozy, former President of France (2007–2012)
- Nursultan Nazarbayev, former President (1990–2019) and Chairman of the Security Council of Kazakhstan
- Aníbal Cavaco Silva, former President of Portugal (2006–2016), and former First Lady Maria Cavaco Silva

=== Speakers of legislatures ===
- Ogtay Asadov, Speaker of the National Assembly of Azerbaijan
- (Croatia) Željko Reiner, Deputy Speaker of the Croatian Sabor (parliament)
- Gaudencio Mohaba Mesu, President of the Chamber of Deputies of Equatorial Guinea
- Faustin Boukoubi, President of the National Assembly of Gabon
- Mariam Jack-Denton, Speaker of the National Assembly of The Gambia
- Saloum Cissé, First Vice-President of the National Assembly of Guinea
- (Republic of Ireland) Denis O'Donovan, Cathaoirleach of Seanad Éireann (president of the Senate of Ireland)
- Elisabetta Casellati, President of the Senate of the Republic of Italy
- Tom Tavares-Finson, President of the Senate of Jamaica
- Christine Razanamahasoa, President of the National Assembly of Madagascar
- Issaka Sidibé, President of the National Assembly of Mali
- Verónica Macamo, President of the National Assembly of Mozambique
- Ilyas Umakhanov, Deputy Speaker of the Federation Council of Russia
- Abass Bundu, Speaker of the House of Parliament of Sierra Leone
- Mahmadsaid Ubaydulloyev, Chairman of the Majlisi Milli of Tajikistan
- Tanzila Norbaeva, Chairwoman of the Senate of Uzbekistan

=== Diplomats ===
- Mohamed El Amine Bencherif, Ambassador of Algeria to Japan
- Ruslan Esin, Ambassador of Belarus to Japan
- Nardi Suxo, Ambassador of Bolivia to Austria
- Nkoloi Nkoloi, Ambassador of Botswana to Japan
- Frank Hsieh, Representative of the Republic of China (Taiwan) to Japan
- Didier Ramazani Bin Kithima, Ambassador of the Democratic Republic of the Congo to Japan
- Félix Ngoma, Ambassador of the Republic of the Congo to Japan
- (Timor-Leste) Nuno Alvares Moniz Marquez Alves, Chargé d'affaires of East Timor to Japan
- Estifanos Afeworki Haile, Ambassador of Eritrea to Japan
- Alejandro Palma Cerna, Ambassador of Honduras to Japan
- Khalil Al-Mousawi, Ambassador of Iraq to Japan
- Yaffa Ben-Ari, Ambassador of Israel to Japan
- Nidal Yehya, Ambassador of Lebanon to Japan
- Blamoh Nelson, Ambassador of Liberia to Japan
- Ahmed Muftah Ruhuma Naili, Chargé d'affaires of Libya to Japan
- Grenenger Msulira Banda, Ambassador of Malawi to Japan
- El Hacen Mohamed Eleyatt, Ambassador of Mauritania to Japan
- Miao Kwong Lee Hong Cheong, Ambassador of Mauritius to China
- Morven M. Luswenyo, Ambassador of Namibia to Japan
- Mohammed Gana Yisa, Ambassador of Nigeria to Japan
- Venetia Sebudandi, Ambassador of Rwanda to Japan
- Edwin Laurent, Ambassador of Saint Lucia to the Republic of China (Taiwan)
- Yahya Abdelghalil Mahmoud Khalil, Ambassador-designate of Sudan to Japan
- Patty Chen, Ambassador of Suriname to China
- Mohamed Elloumi, Ambassador of Tunisia to Japan
- César Ferrer, Ambassador of Uruguay to Japan
- Seiko Ishikawa, Ambassador of Venezuela to Japan
- Bashir Mohammed Ali Qasim, Ambassador of Yemen to Japan

=== Other national representatives ===
- Maria Ubach i Font, Minister of Foreign Affairs of Andorra
- Frederico Cardoso, Chief of Staff of the Presidency of Angola
- Elwood Donaldson, Special Representative at the Department of Foreign Affairs of The Bahamas
- Alpha Barry, Minister of Foreign Affairs and Regional Cooperation of Burkina Faso
- Ezéchiel Nibigira, Minister of External Relations and International Cooperation of Burundi
- Richard Wagner, Chief Justice of Canada
- Achta Saleh Damane, Secretary of State for Foreign Affairs of Chad
- Carlos Holmes Trujillo, Minister of Foreign Affairs of Colombia, and Alba Lucía Anaya
- Claudia Dobles Camargo, First Lady of Costa Rica
- Andri Moustakoudes, First Lady of Cyprus
- María de los Ángeles García, wife of foreign affairs minister Miguel Vargas of the Dominican Republic
- Khaled al-Anani, Minister of Antiquities of Egypt
- Rebecca Akufo-Addo, First Lady of Ghana
- Panagiotis Pikrammenos, Deputy Prime Minister of Greece, and Athina Noutsou
- Dawn Hastings-Williams, Minister of State of Guyana
- Bocchit Edmond, Minister of Foreign Affairs and Worship of Haiti
- Cardinal Francesco Monterisi, papal envoy of the Holy See (cardinal-deacon of San Paolo alla Regola)
- Laya Joneydi, Vice President for Legal Affairs of Iran
- Ruateki Tekaiara, Minister of Infrastructure and Sustainable Energy of Kiribati
- Olga Sánchez Cordero, Secretary of the Interior of Mexico
- Denis Moncada, Minister of Foreign Affairs of Nicaragua, and María Delia Guadamuz Núñez
- Boss Mustapha, Secretary to the Government of the Federation of Nigeria
- Andrej Žernovski, Deputy Minister of Foreign Affairs of North Macedonia
- Badr bin Hamad Al Busaidi, Secretary General of the Ministry of Foreign Affairs of Oman
- Faustina K. Rehuher-Marugg, Minister of State of Palau
- Francesco Petrozzi, Minister of Culture of Peru
- Agata Kornhauser-Duda, First Lady of Poland
- Mark Brantley, Minister of Foreign Affairs of Saint Kitts and Nevis
- Nicola Renzi, Secretary for Foreign and Political Affairs of San Marino
- Amadou Hott, Minister of Economy, Planning and International Cooperation of Senegal
- Abdulkadir Ahmed Kheyr Abdi, Minister of State for Foreign Affairs of Somalia
- Candith Mashego-Dlamini, Deputy Minister of International Relations and Cooperation of South Africa
- Kuol Manyang Juuk, Minister of Defense and Veterans Affairs of South Sudan
- Viola Amherd, Federal Councillor and Head of the Federal Department of Defence, Civil Protection and Sport of Switzerland
- George Mkuchika, Minister of State in the President's Office for Public Service and Good Governance of Tanzania
- Mehmet Ersoy, Minister of Culture and Tourism of Turkey
- Simon Kofe, Minister for Justice, Communication and Foreign Affairs of Tuvalu
- Ephraim Kamuntu, Minister of Tourism, Wildlife and Antiquities of Uganda
- Elaine Chao, Secretary of Transportation of the United States
- Rodolfo Nin Novoa, Minister of Foreign Affairs of Uruguay
- Joseph Malanji, Minister of Foreign Affairs of Zambia
- Simbarashe Mumbengegwi, former Minister of Foreign Affairs of Zimbabwe

=== Other subnational representatives ===
- Carrie Lam, Chief Executive of Hong Kong (China)
- Fernando Chui, Chief Executive of Macau (China), and Winnie Fok

== International organisations ==
- Federica Mogherini, High Representative of the European Union for Foreign Affairs and Security Policy
- Maria Luiza Ribeiro Viotti, Chef de Cabinet to the Secretary-General of the United Nations

== Absences ==
- The Emperor Emeritus and Empress Emerita, including the Princess Mikasa did not attend the enthronement ceremony itself, participating only at a tea party reception held by the Emperor for foreign royalty the following day.
- The governments of Syria and North Korea, the latter of which does not maintain diplomatic relations with Japan, were not invited by the Ministry of Foreign Affairs to attend.
