= Princess Tsuguko of Takamado =

Japanese princess (born 1986)

Princess Tsuguko
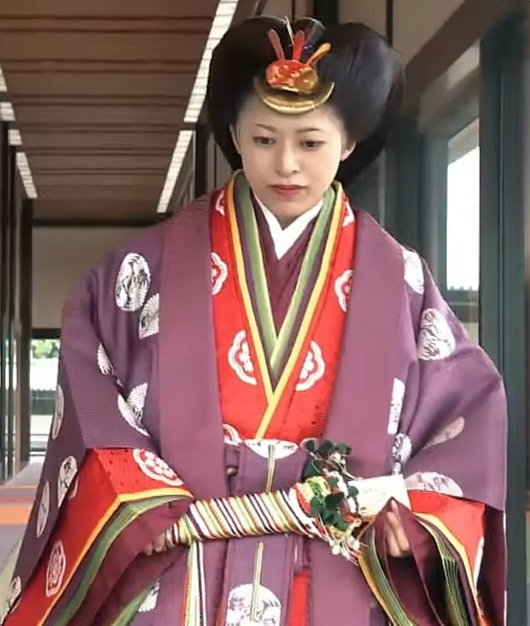
- Tsuguko in 2019
- Born: 8 March 1986 (age 40); Aiiku Hospital, Minami-Azabu, Tokyo, Japan
- House: Imperial House of Japan
- Father: Norihito, Prince Takamado
- Mother: Hisako Tottori

Princess Tsuguko of Takamado (承子女王, Tsuguko Joō; born 8 March 1986) is a member of the Imperial House of Japan, paternal second cousin of Emperor Naruhito and the eldest daughter of Norihito, Prince Takamado, and his wife Hisako, Princess Takamado.

== Biography ==
=== Childhood and education ===
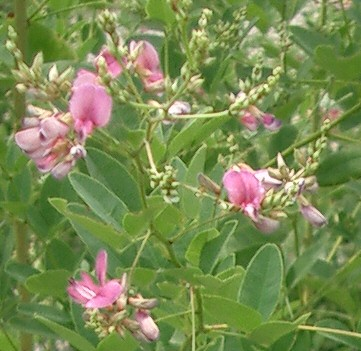
Japanese clovers, Lespedeza, designated imperial personal emblem of Tsuguko

Princess Tsuguko was born on 8 March 1986 at Aiiku Hospital in Minami-Azabu, Tokyo as the first daughter and child of Norihito, Prince Takamado and his wife Hisako, Princess Takamado (née Tottori). She has two younger sisters: Noriko (born 1988) and Ayako (born 1990), both of whom are no longer members of the Japanese Imperial Family.

She graduated from Gakushuin Primary School, Gakushuin Girls' Junior and Senior High School. After that, she entered the Faculty of Intercultural Studies of Gakushuin Women's College, but dropped out in March 2005. She attended the University of Edinburgh in Scotland from 13 April 2004 to 1 July 2008, where she studied criminal psychology and sociology, but dropped out.

In March 2013, Princess Tsuguko graduated from the School of International Liberal Studies at Waseda University with a bachelor's degree. She works at the Japan Committee for UNICEF from April 2013.

== Public life and duties ==
=== 2006–2010 ===
Princess Tsuguko participates frequently in the activities of the Imperial family: she came of age on 8 March 2006, when she turned 20. To mark the occasion, she was awarded the 2nd class of the Order of the Precious Crown and attended a press conference in her honor. Since then, she has been able to take part in activities on behalf of the Imperial Family. In 2006, Princess Tsuguko represented the Imperial family at the Silver Wedding anniversary celebrations of Grand Duke Henri and Grand Duchess Maria Teresa of Luxembourg.

=== 2011–2013 ===
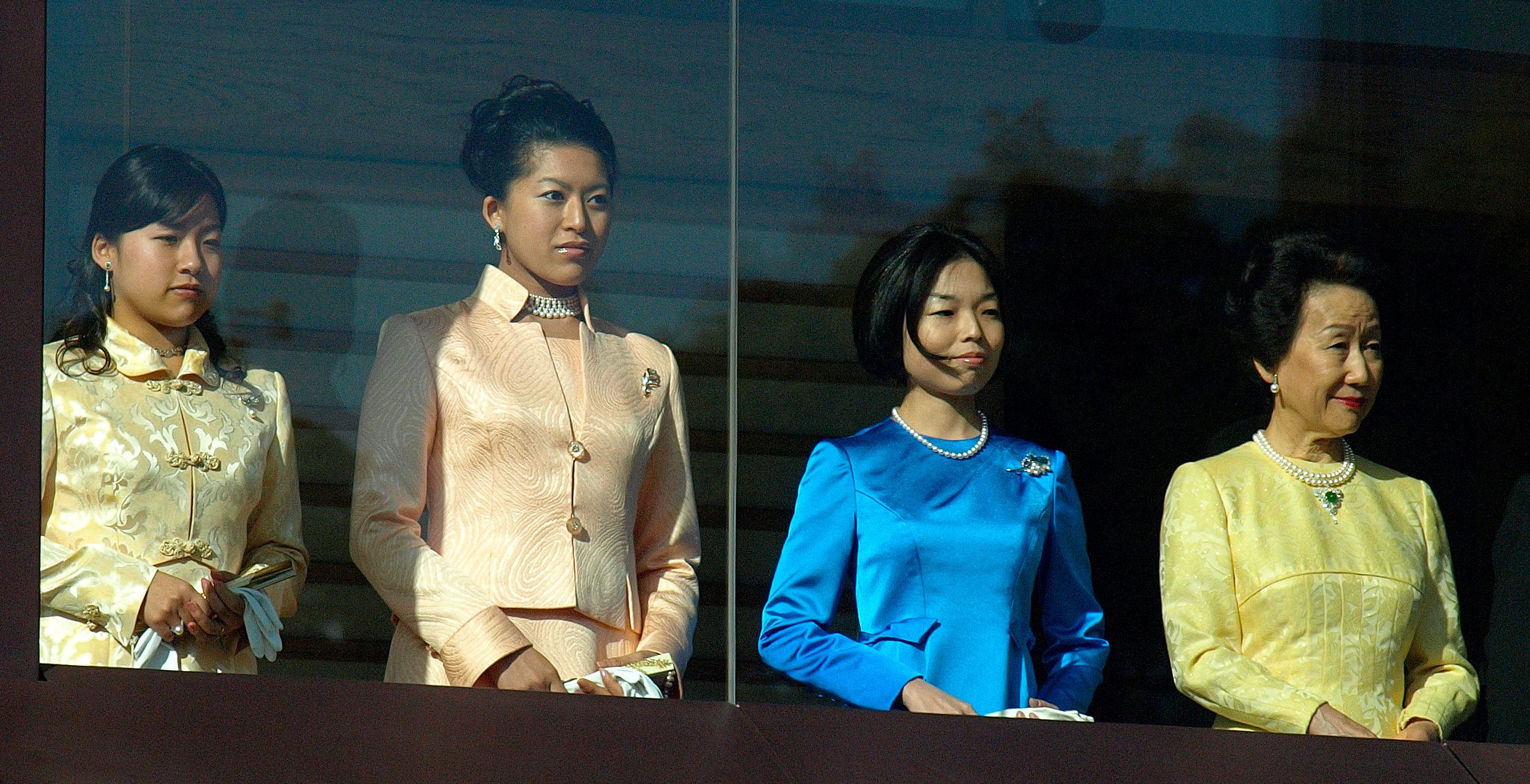
Princess Tsuguko with her sister Princess Ayako, her cousin Princess Akiko and Hanako, Princess Hitachi, at New Year celebrations on 2 January 2011

In August 2011, she attended the "28th Tokyo Disabilities Comprehensive Art Exhibition" held in the main store of the Seibu Department Stores located in Ikebukuro, Toshima, Tokyo, with her mother Hisako.

In February 2012, she and her mother, as well as Takako, former Princess Suga (a sister of Emperor Emeritus Akihito) attended the Japan Grand Prix International Orchid Festival 2012 in Tokyo and met with members of the Oman Embassy in Japan. On 8 April 2012, Princess Tsuguko visited and toured the Arab Charity Bazaar organized by the "Society of the Wives of the Arab Ambassadors in Japan (SWAAJ)" in Tokyo.

In August 2013 she paid an unofficial visit to Sri Lanka at the invitation of the then-President Mahinda Rajapaksa: on 20 August 2013, she met the president for a courtesy call; on the same day, she met the also visiting Princess Sirindhorn of Thailand and together they toured the Temple of the Tooth in Kandy and attended the local Kandy Esala Perahera Festival. Princess Tsuguko visited the Malwathu Maha Viharaya Monastery in Kandy; on 22 August 2013, she took a helicopter tour of the Minneriya National Park in North Central Province and of the historical city of Anuradhapura; In September 2013, she attended the final of the Grass Ski World Championships in Shichikashuku, Miyagi Prefecture.

=== 2014–2019 ===
On 14 February 2014 Princess Tsuguko attended the Japan Grand Prix International Orchid Festival 2014 at the Tokyo Dome, in Tokyo. On the occasion, she met Wasantha Karannagoda, then-Ambassador of Sri Lanka to Japan. On 13 December 2014, The Princess attended the finals of the 94th Emperor's Cup All-Japan Soccer Championship Tournament at Nissan Stadium in Yokohama, Kanagawa Prefecture, awarding the winning team.

In March 2015, the Princess and her mother met Crown Prince Frederik and his wife Crown Princess Mary of Denmark during their state visit to Japan and attended some official events with them. In May 2015, she visited Watari Town, Watari District, Miyagi Prefecture, which had been damaged because of the 2011 Tōhoku earthquake and tsunami, with her mother Hisako. She visited and inspected the 2nd Regional Coast Guard Headquarters of the Japan Coast Guard. After that, she also visited the Marine Rescue Miyagi, the regional organization of Marine Rescue Japan (her mother Hisako officiates as honorary president), laid flowers to the victims and gave a message of sympathy to the members. Between 1 August and 2 August 2015, Princess Tsuguko visited Ishikawa Prefecture to attend the 43rd All Japan Amateur Orchestra Festival.

In January 2018, she succeeded her mother as "Honorary President of the All Japan Archery Federation" and the following month, in February, she became "Honorary Chairman of the Japan Squash Association".

On 22 March 2018, she attended a ceremonial reception at the Delegation of the European Union to Japan in Minato, Tokyo on the occasion of the celebration of the 25th anniversary of diplomatic relations between the Republic of Croatia and Japan. On 22 May 2018, Princess Tsuguko attended a "Panel for Life" event held at Haneda Airport, Tokyo, and gave a speech about her experience with animals. The Princess attended the "60th All Japan Hospital Association conference" on 6 October 2018 at Grand Nikko Tokyo Daiba, Tokyo. On 25 November 2018, Tsuguko attended the "47th All Japan Squash Championships Final" in Yokohama, Kanagawa Prefecture.

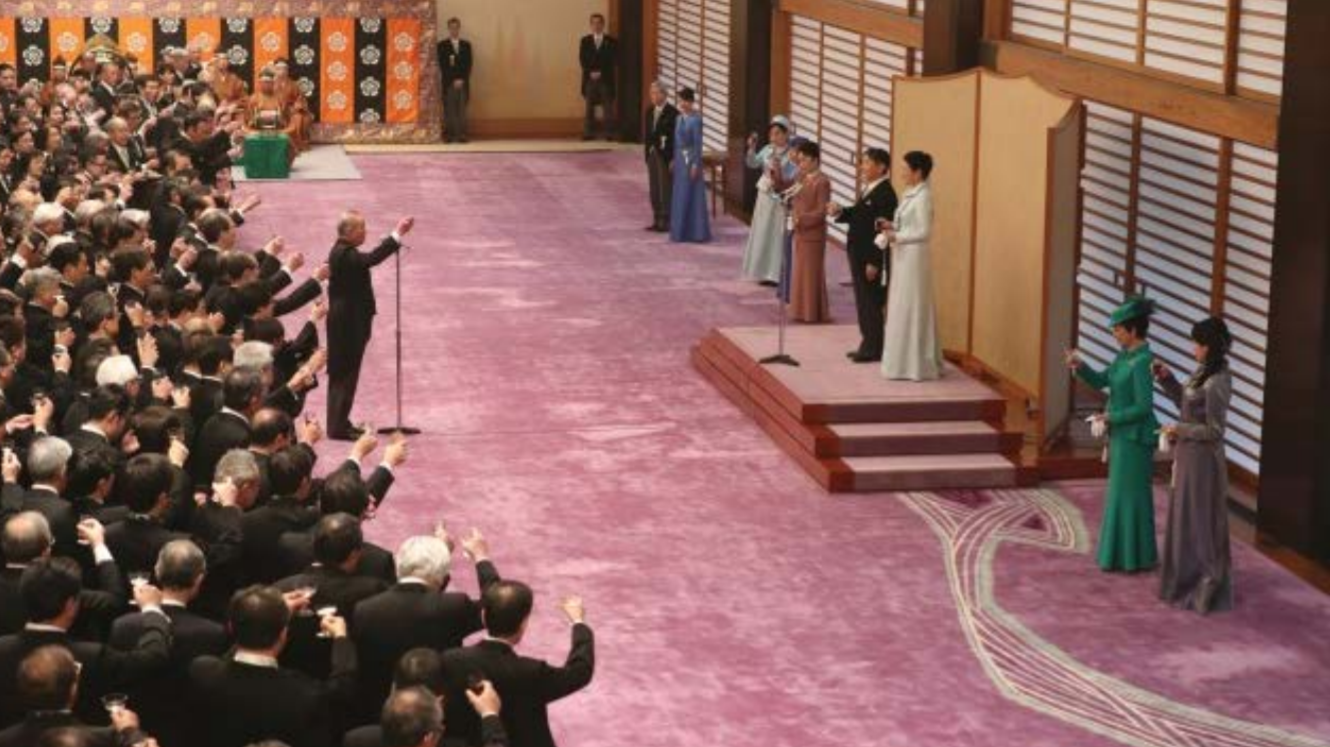
Members of the Imperial Family during the enthronement ceremonies of Emperor Naruhito. Tsuguko, in purple, is to Empress Masako's left; December 2019

Princess Tsuguko attended the "Japan Grand Prix International Orchid and Flower Show" at the Tokyo Dome stadium, Tokyo on 15 February 2019. On 28 April 2019, she attended a ceremony to unveil the completion of the "Yume no Shima Park" archery range in a Tokyo district. On 10 August 2019, Princess Tsuguko visited Yatsushiro, Kumamoto Prefecture, to attend the "Archery finals of the Inter-High School General Sports Championships". On 4 and 5 October 2019, Princess Tsuguko visited Kasama, Ibaraki Prefecture to attend the "74th National Sports Festival". On 17 November 2019, Princess Tsuguko attended the "48th All Japan Squash Championships Final" at Tressa Yokohama Mall in Yokohama, Kanagawa Prefecture, as Honorary President of Japan Squash Association. On 21 November 2019, The Princess and her mother attended the opening and reception of the "Nuns Healing Hearts" photo exhibition at Mitsubishi Ichigokan Museum in Tokyo. The exhibit was connected to the 2019 visit of Pope Francis to Japan. On 5 December 2019, Tsuguko visited the National Art Center in Minato, Tokyo for the exhibition "Treasures from Budapest: European and Hungarian Masterpieces from the Museum of Fine Arts, Budapest and the Hungarian National Gallery" together with the Prime Minister of Hungary, Viktor Orbán.

=== 2021–2023 ===
On 27 and 28 February 2021, Princess Tsuguko attended the "Kyoto Congress Youth Forum", in Kyoto. On 21 August 2021, Princess Tsuguko virtually attended the awards and closing ceremony of the archery competition of the "Inter-High School Championships" in Fukui Prefecture, as Honorary President of the All Japan Archery Federation. The Princess attended the "1st Global Youth Forum for a Culture of Lawfulness" in Tokyo on 9 and 10 October 2021.

Princess Tsuguko, as Honorary President, attended the "2022 Inter-High School Archery Competition" in Marugame, Kagawa Prefecture, on 10 August 2022. On 21 September 2022, Princess Tsuguko attended the "Peace Symposium Tokyo 2022" in Tokyo. Later that same day, she attended a reception with Rahm Emanuel, United States ambassador to Japan. Princess Tsuguko attended the state funeral of former Prime Minister Shinzo Abe on 27 September 2022 in Tokyo with her mother, Hisako, Princess Takamado. On 4 October 2022, Princess Tsuguko opened the "Yamanashi Jewelry Exhibition" at the Embassy of Oman in Tokyo, on the occasion of the 50th anniversary of the establishment of diplomatic relations between Oman and Japan. From 8 to 9 October 2022, Princess Tsuguko visited Tochigi Prefecture for the "77th National Sports Festival". The Princess attended the "2nd Global Youth Forum for a Culture of Lawfulness" in Kyoto on 3 and 4 December 2022. On 18 December 2022, she attended the "2022 Empress's Cup All Japan Volleyball Championship Final" at the Tokyo Metropolitan Gymnasium in Shibuya, Tokyo.

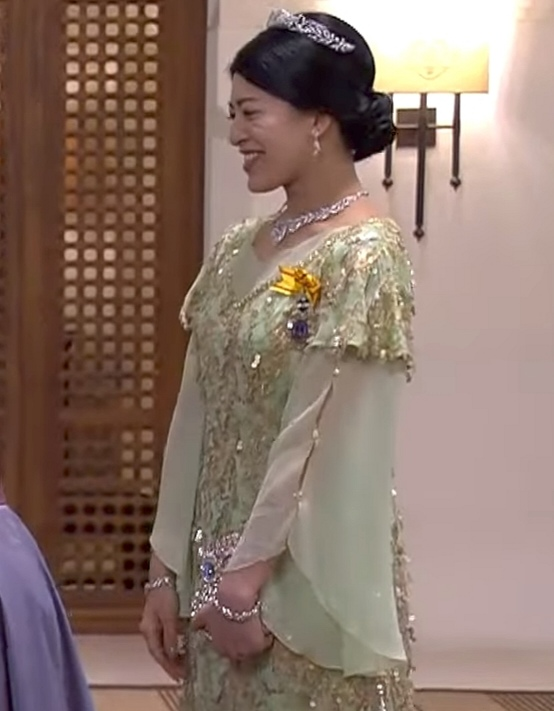
Princess Tsuguko during the wedding reception of Crown Prince Hussein of Jordan and Rajwa Al Saif, June 2023

On 5 March 2023, Princess Tsuguko attended the celebrations marking the 30th anniversary of the establishment of diplomatic relations between Croatia and Japan at the Embassy of the Republic of Croatia in Shibuya, Tokyo. On 11 April 2023, the Princess and her mother Hisako, Princess Takamado met King Abdullah II and Crown Prince Hussein of Jordan during their state visit in Japan from 7 to 12 April. On 11 May 2023, Princess Tsuguko joined the rest of the Imperial Family with her mother to attend the first Spring Garden Party of the Reiwa era at the Akasaka Imperial Gardens, Tokyo. From 29 May to 3 June 2023, Princess Tsuguko and her mother paid an official visit to Jordan to attend the wedding of Hussein, Crown Prince of Jordan, and Rajwa Al Saif. On 30 May 2023, Tsuguko visited a Palestinian refugee camp in Amman, the capital of Jordan, together with her mother. Tsuguko and her mother also visited "UNICEF supported Makani centre" in Amman. On 31 May 2023 Tsuguko attended the ceremony to announce the creation and establishment of the Jordanian-Japanese Friendship Association at the Four Seasons Hotel in Amman. At the event, she met Prince El Hassan bin Talal of Jordan, his wife Princess Sarvath El Hassan, their daughter Princess Sumaya bint El Hassan and Princess Wijdan Al Hashemi; on the same day, Tsuguko visited "BirdLife International Middle East" at The Royal Society for the Conservation of Nature, the partner of BirdLife in Jordan; on 1 June 2023, Princess Tsuguko and her mother attended the wedding of Crown Prince Hussein and Princess Rajwa at Zahran Palace. On 2 June 2023, Tsuguko and her mother visited a Japanese complementary school in Jordan, on 3 June 2023, Princess Tsuguko and her mother returned to Japan. This was her first official visit abroad, as previous visits to foreign countries by the Princess have been considered private by the Imperial Household Agency.
On 10 August 2023, Princess Tsuguko attended the "2023 National High School (Inter-High) Archery Competition" in Obihiro, Hokkaido Prefecture, as patroness of the "All Japan Archery Federation". On 30 September 2023, Princess Tsuguko attended the "FIVB Paris Olympic Qualifier/World Cup Volleyball 2023 Men's Japan vs Finland" match at Yoyogi National Gymnasium, in Tokyo. From 13 to 15 October 2023, the Princess visited Kagoshima Prefecture for the special National Sports Festival. She visited the cities of Hioki, Makurazaki and Amami.

=== 2024–present ===
On 6 January 2024, Princess Tsuguko attended the "9th All Japan Brass Symphony Competition Finals" at Fuchu-no-mori Art Theater, in Tokyo. On 8 January 2024, she attended the "76th All Japan High School Volleyball Championship Women's Final" at Tokyo Metropolitan Gymnasium, in Tokyo. On 7 February 2024, The Princess attended the "Japan Grand Prix International Orchid and Flower Show 2024 - Festival of Flowers & Greenery" at Tokyo Dome City Prism Hall, in Tokyo. On 5 April 2024, she and her mother attended the "2024 Cherry Blossom Charity Ball" organised by the International Ladies Benevolent Society (ILBS) at Hotel Okura, in Tokyo. On 17 April 2024, Princess Tsuguko and her mother Princess Hisako visited Meiji Jingu in Shibuya, Tokyo to commemorate the 110th anniversary of Empress Shoken's death. On 7 August 2024, she attended the 57th National High School Archery Championship finals, and awards and closing ceremony at Kakidomari Stadium in Nagasaki, Nagasaki Prefecture, as President of the "All Japan Archery Federation". On the occasion of her visit to the Prefecture, on the same day she visited the Nagasaki Peace Memorial Hall. From 7 to 8 October 2024, Princess Tsuguko visited Saga Prefecture to attend the 78th National Sports Festival. Between 24 November and 27 November 2024, she attended the mourning and funeral events for her grandmother Princess Mikasa who died on 15 November. She was present at the "Renso no Gi" funeral at Toshimagaoka Cemetery on 26 November and the day-one grave visit on 27 November.

On 12 January 2025, Princess Tsuguko attended the "10th All Japan Brass Symphony Competition Finals" at the Kawasaki Sports Complex, in Kawasaki, Kanagawa Prefecture. On 5 February 2025, she attended the "Japan Grand Prix International Orchid and Flower Show 2025 - Festival of Flowers & Greenery" at the Tokyo Dome City Prism All, in Bunkyo, Tokyo. Between 14 and 15 February 2025, Princess Tsuguko visited Kyoto Prefecture to attend the "3rd Global Youth Forum for a Culture of Lawfulness" at the Kyoto International Conference Center in Kyoto City. On 25 February 2025, she and her mother attended the funeral of Tsuneo Watanabe (director and editor of Yomiuri Shimbun Holdings) at the Imperial Hotel, in Tokyo. On 14 March 2025, she attended the BirdLife Spring Gala 2025 at Hotel New Otani in Osaka City, Osaka Prefecture together with her mother. On 24 March 2025, Princess Tsuguko attended a concert and reception on the occasion of the celebrations for the 60th anniversary of establishment of diplomatic relations between Japan and South Korea. On 4 April 2025, she was present for the second time at the "2025 Cherry Blossom Charity Ball" sponsored by the International Ladies Benevolent Society at Hotel Okura. On 26 April 2025, Princess Tsuguko attended the Ikebana International 13th World Convention 2025 at Kyoto International Conference Center in Kyoto. On 19 May 2025, The Princess toured the Osaka-Kansai Expo 2025 at its headquarters in Osaka City, Osaka Prefecture, also attending a cultural event hosted by President Santiago Peña and First Lady Leticia Ocampos of Paraguay at the Paraguayan Pavilion. On 22 May 2025, she attended the Japan-Hungary Diplomatic Memorial Concert at Hakuju Hall in Shibuya, Tokyo, regarding the anniversary of the establishment of diplomatic relations between the two countries; at the event she met also President Tamás Sulyok of Hungary. On 27 May 2025, Princess Tsuguko attended the welcoming ceremony and reception dinner for President Halla Tómasdóttir of Iceland. On 30 June 2025, she granted an audience to the short-term foreign researchers sent by Japanese administrative officials to the United Kingdom at the Takamado Residence in Tokyo. On 1 July 2025, Princess Tsuguko and her mother visited Ishikawa Prefecture to see reconstructions' efforts and damages caused by the Noto Peninsula earthquake. On 8 August 2025, she visited Yamaguchi Prefecture to attend the 58th National High School Archery Championship finals at Atago Sports Complex, in Iwakuni. She visited Osaka Prefecture for the Osaka-Kansai Expo 2025 again between 21 and 22 August 2025, also attending the UN National Day and touring the UN Pavilion with António Guterres on the 22nd.

== Role for UNICEF ==
In addition to activities on behalf of the Imperial Family, Tsuguko has been working at the Japan Committee for UNICEF since April 2013 and plays an active role in representing it:

On 19 February 2018, Princess Tsuguko traveled to Kumamoto Prefecture to attend a conference on sports and children's rights and acted as a lecturer. Her lecture was attended by 100 participants who asked her questions about the work of UNICEF. Princess Tsuguko, in her UNICEF role, met King Carl XVI Gustaf and Queen Silvia of Sweden during their state visit to Japan from 22 to 25 April 2018 at "UNICEF House" in Tokyo where she gave them a tour of the exhibition on the international work of UNICEF and introduced them to the work of the Japanese branch of UNICEF. She, as a UNICEF employee, visited East Timor between 10 and 14 September 2018. She participated in some events related to the association in Gleno. Princess Tsuguko visited a school in Midorioka, Ibaraki Prefecture, on 28 November 2018, to talk to the children of the school about the importance of water and the need not to waste it; she also spoke about the problems that children from the most remote areas of the world have in being able to use it.

From 20 to 21 May 2019 she visited Wakayama Prefecture as a part of a UNICEF visit: on the 20th, she visited Wakayama Prefectural office; and on the 21st, she visited Sunayama Elementary School: she lectured the children in attendance about UNICEF's work across Japan and gave them resistance exercises with weights. The Princess visited Switzerland as a part of a UNICEF tour from 25 to 29 September 2019: she traveled due to workshop for staff of Japanese offices hosted by UNICEF Headquarters in Switzerland. On 1 November 2019, Tsuguko traveled to Chuo University Tama Campus in Hachioji, Tokyo to participate in the conference "The Current Status and Challenges of Immunization in Africa and Asia" organized by the UNICEF and her. Tsuguko spoke to the children present about the importance of vaccines and the consequences of not getting them.

From 11 to 13 May 2022, Princess Tsuguko visited Miyazaki Prefecture as part of a UNICEF tour. She gave a presentation to elementary and middle classes at a local school on the conditions of children around the world, then visited government offices of the Prefecture, and met with members of Miyazaki's UNICEF group. She visited Ehime Prefecture as a UNICEF employee from 8 to 9 September 2022: on the 8th, she visited the Prefectural office in Matsuyama and met with Governor; on the 9th, she went to an elementary school in Matsuyama, where she spent time with the children, which she explained the current situation of children all over the world suffering from war and poverty. On 22 November 2022, the Princess gave a lecture on international development to students at Chuo University, Tokyo. Princess Tsuguko spoke about UNICEF's role in the world, exchanged ideas and answered students' questions and gave the closing remarks of the seminar.

Princess Tsuguko and members of "UNICEF Caravan campaign" visited Saitama Prefecture and its prefectural office on 23 May 2023, as part of a series of events organised by UNICEF of Saitama Prefecture. On 24 May 2023, she, accompanied by UNICEF, visited the governor of Tochigi Prefecture in Tochigi, Tochigi Prefecture, to talk about the work of UNICEF's Tochigi branch. From 7 to 8 June 2023, Princess Tsuguko visited Kanagawa Prefecture with the UNICEF Caravan campaign: she gave lectures on UNICEF in local schools and later met with the Governor of the Prefecture and the Superintendent of Education. On 19 October 2023, Princess Tsuguko and Japan Committee for UNICEF visited Yamagata Prefecture, where the Princess gave lectures and presented presentations to students from some local schools, and acted as a guide. From 24 to 25 October 2023, she visited Fukushima Prefecture to meet Fukushima's governor and to participate in some UNICEF-related events at Omori Elementary School and Sukagawa Toyo High School. On 8 November 2023, Princess Tsuguko, in her UNICEF role, visited Morioka, Iwate Prefecture, to inspect the Prefectural Office and to give lessons in local schools.

On 11 May 2024, she attended a networking event for UNICEF campus members at Chuo University: she spoke of her experiences with the UNICEF and proposed various methods to reduce poverty. From 27 to 28 May 2024, Princess Tsuguko, as a UNICEF employee, visited Ishikawa Prefecture for UNICEF events: on the 27th, she met with the Governor of the Prefecture to talk about UNICEF and its purpose; on the 28th, she visited two schools in Kanazawa to talk to the children present about the situation of children in developing countries. On 28 June 2024, she attended a virtual conference at Chuo University Tama Campus, about how to apply possible charitable (and/or UNICEF-provided) solutions in African poor countries. Tsuguko provided her explanations and proposed solutions to the problems. From 17 to 18 October 2024, she, as a UNICEF employee, visited Kyoto Prefecture: on the 18th, she held a class for children at Kyotanba Town Mizuho Junior High School in Kyōtamba, where she talked about the importance of children's rights globally and the need to respect them. Between 12 and 13 November 2024, Princess Tsuguko visited Nara Prefecture together with UNICEF: on the 12th, she met with vice governor Takeo Fukutani at the Nara prefecture office and others; on the 13th, she presented a conference regarding UNICEF and children of the world for the students at Masugakita Primary School in Kashihara, and at Shirakashi School.

== Health ==
In mid-July 2022, Princess Tsuguko tested positive for COVID-19. The Imperial Household Agency reported that she was asymptomatic and would recover at home.

== Honours ==
Mon of the Takamado branch of the Imperial Family

=== National honours ===
- Member 2nd Class (Peony) of the Order of the Precious Crown -

=== Honorary positions ===
- Honorary President of the All Japan Archery Federation
- Honorary Chairman of Japan Squash Association
