= Damane =

Damane may refer to:

== People ==
- Achta Saleh Damane, Chadian journalist and politician
- David Aron Damane, American actor and writer
- Damane Duckett (born 1981), American football offensive tackle
- Damane Zakaria (died 2022), Central African warlord

== Fiction ==
- Damane (The Wheel of Time), a term in the Wheel of Time novel series by Robert Jordan
- "Damane" (The Wheel of Time episode), a 2023 TV episode
