= Wedding of Hussein, Crown Prince of Jordan, and Rajwa Al Saif =

2023 royal wedding

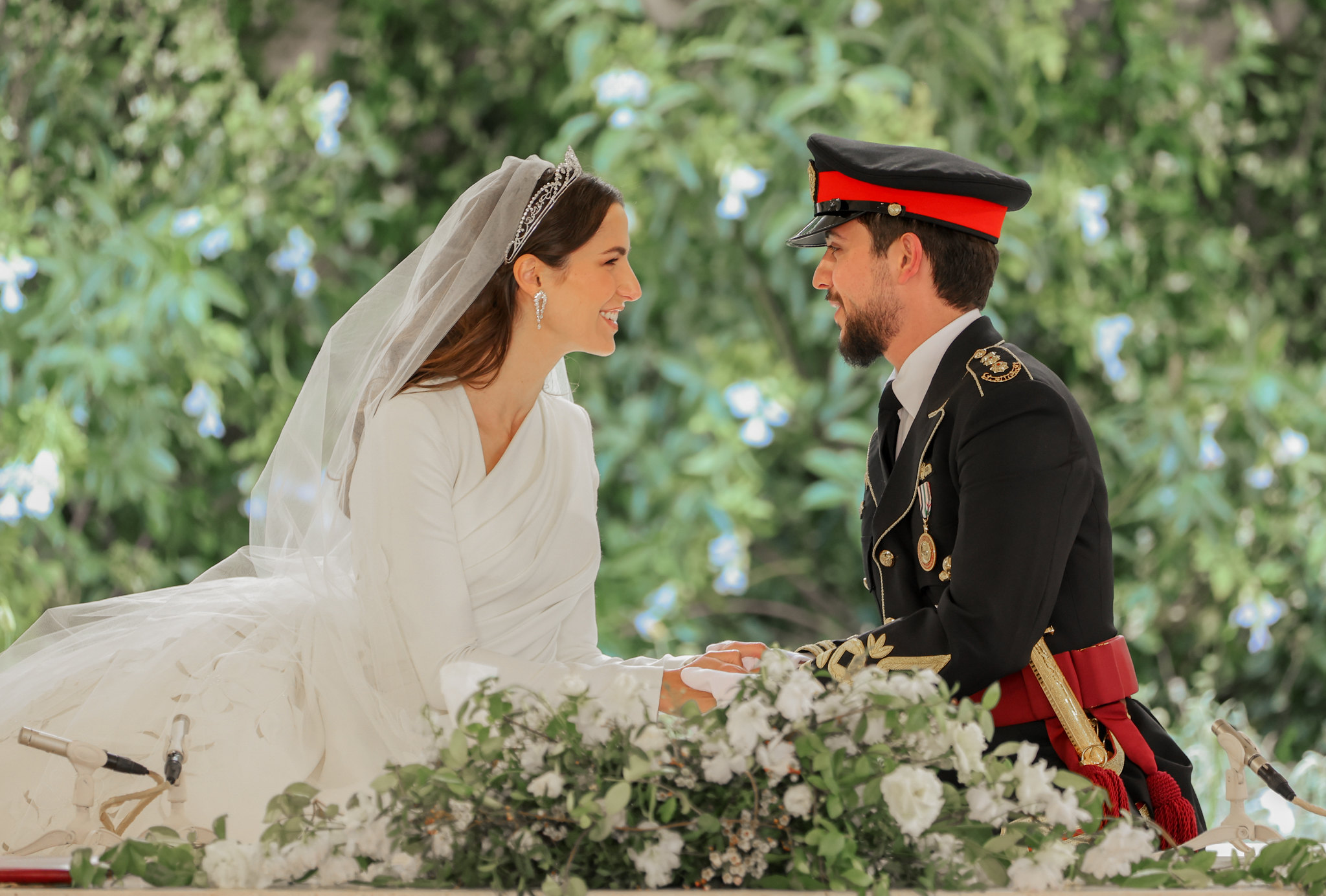
- Date: 1 June 2023
- Venue: Zahran Palace
- Location: Amman, Jordan
- Participants: Hussein, Crown Prince of Jordan; Rajwa Al Saif

The wedding of Hussein, Crown Prince of Jordan, and Rajwa Al Saif took place at Zahran Palace in Amman, Jordan on 1 June 2023.

Hussein is the eldest son of King Abdullah II and Queen Rania, and heir apparent to the Jordanian throne. Al Saif is the youngest daughter of Saudi businessman Khaled Al-Saif and Azza Al Sudairi.

== Engagement ==
The couple's engagement was announced by the Royal Hashemite Court on Twitter on 17 August 2022. The engagement ceremony took place at the home of Al Saif's father in Riyadh and was attended by members of the Jordanian royal family, namely the King and Queen, Prince El Hassan bin Talal, Prince Hashem bin Abdullah, Prince Ali bin Al Hussein, Prince Hashim bin Al Hussein, Prince Ghazi bin Muhammad, Prince Rashid bin El Hassan, and members of the Al Saif family. For the engagement ceremony, Al Saif wore an embroidered abaya from Lebanese brand Orient 499 with a bronze belt borrowed from Hussein's mother, Queen Rania. Queen Rania also lent Al Saif a pair of white gold and yellow diamond Stephen Webster earrings for one of the engagement portraits.

Crown Prince Hussein presented Al Saif with a pear-cut diamond Harry Winston ring.

Queen Rania shared her congratulations on Instagram, stating "I didn't think it was possible to hold so much joy in my heart! Congratulations to my eldest Prince Hussein and his beautiful bride-to-be, Rajwa".

On 31 December 2022, the Royal Hashemite Court announced that the wedding would take place on 1 June 2023. It was later revealed that the wedding would take place at Zahran Palace.

The Royal Hashemite Court also released an official logo for the wedding, which is the Arabic characters for "we rejoice". The log also contained the date of the wedding, which was the first of June 2023.

== Pre-wedding celebrations ==
On 22 May 2023, Queen Rania hosted a traditional Henna party in honour of Al Saif at Madareb Bani Hashem. Female members of both families attended. Al Saif wore a bespoke dress by Saudi designer Honayda Serafi. Traditional Jordanian and Saudi songs were performed by Nedaa Shrara, Diana Karazon and Zain Awad, with performances by the Haleem Musical Group, Al Salt Girls Band and Misk Dance Company. The party was followed by a dinner hosted by Queen Rania, who gave a speech commending her soon-to-be daughter in law.

On 31 May 2023, Hussein's first cousin, Prince Omar bin Faisal, hosted a groom's shower attended by male relatives and friends. That evening, King Abdullah II hosted a banquet in honour of the wedding at Madareb Bani Hashem. Many tribal chiefs, businessmen, and public figures attended the dinner.

== Wedding ==
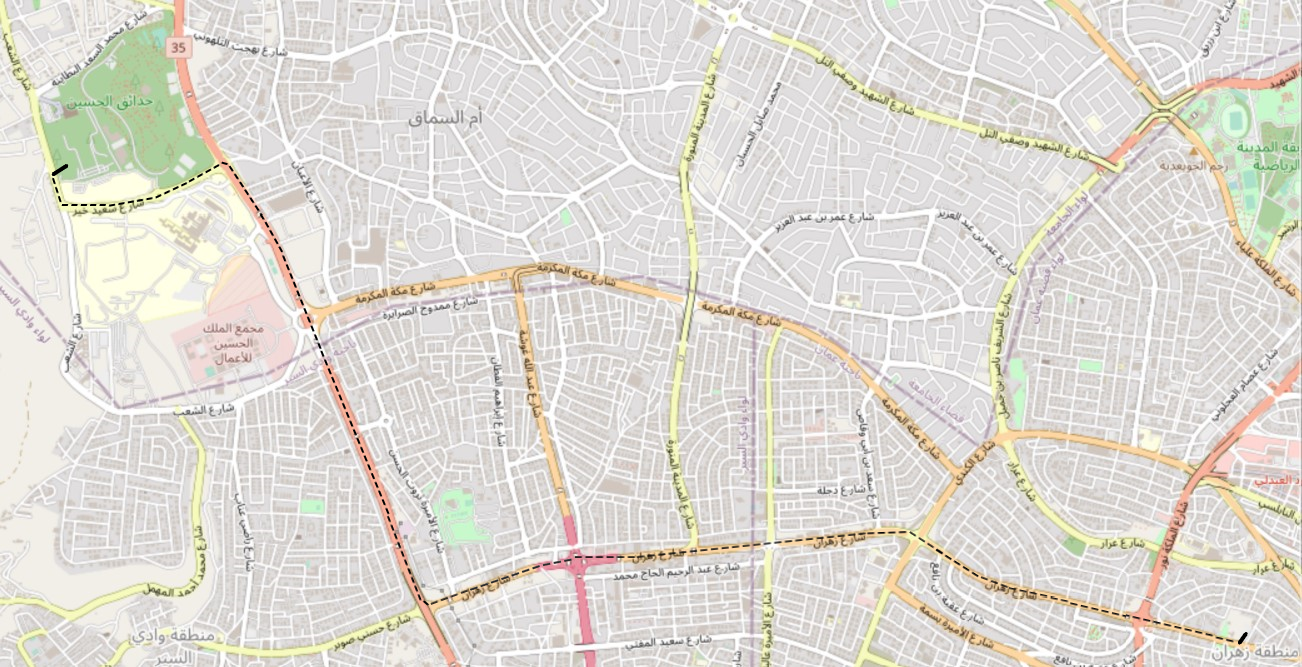
Map of the procession route at the wedding

The wedding took place at 4:00 pm local time on 1 June 2023, at Zahran Palace.

Upon her marriage, Rajwa Al Saif was bestowed the style and title of "Her Royal Highness Princess Rajwa Al Hussein". The bride and groom then rode in a procession through the streets before reaching Al Husseiniya Palace, where a state banquet was held with 1,700 guests.

On her wedding day, Al Saif wore a dress with an asymmetrical neckline and a detachable train by Elie Saab. She also wore diamond earrings and a tiara that secured her elaborate veil. The bride was escorted to the place of the marriage on the arm of her brother-in-law, Prince Hashem bin Abdullah. For the state banquet, Al Saif wore the same tiara and earrings with a bespoke Dolce & Gabbana white cap-sleeve ballgown and opera gloves.

== Guests ==
A video showing the procession of Crown Prince Hussein and Princess Rajwa following their wedding.

=== Relatives of the groom ===
==== Jordanian royal family ====
- The King and Queen, the groom's parents
  - Princess Iman bint Abdullah and Jameel Alexander Thermiótis, the groom's sister and brother-in-law
  - Princess Salma bint Abdullah, the groom's sister
  - Prince Hashem bin Abdullah, the groom's brother
- Princess Muna Al Hussein, the groom's paternal grandmother
  - Prince Faisal bin Al Hussein and Princess Zeina Faisal, the groom's paternal uncle and aunt
  - Princess Aisha bint Al Hussein, the groom's paternal aunt
  - Princess Zein bint Al Hussein, the groom's paternal aunt
- Princess Alia bint Al Hussein, the groom's paternal half-aunt
- Prince Ali bin Al Hussein and Princess Rym Ali, the groom's paternal half-uncle and aunt
- Prince Hashim bin Al Hussein and Princess Fahdah Hashim, the groom's paternal half-uncle and aunt
- Princess Raiyah bint Al Hussein and Faris Ned Donovan, the groom's paternal half-aunt and uncle
- Princess Firyal Muhammad, ex-wife of the groom's paternal great-uncle
  - Prince Talal bin Muhammad and Princess Ghida Talal, the groom's paternal first cousin once removed and his wife
  - Prince Ghazi bin Muhammad and Princess Miriam Ghazi, the groom's paternal first cousin once removed and his wife
- Princess Taghrid Muhammad, the groom's paternal great-aunt
- Prince El Hassan bin Talal and Princess Sarvath El Hassan, the groom's paternal great-uncle and great-aunt
  - Princess Rahma bint El Hassan, the groom's paternal first cousin once removed
  - Princess Sumaya bint El Hassan, the groom's paternal first cousin once removed
  - Prince Rashid bin El Hassan and Princess Zeina Rashid, the groom's paternal first cousin once removed and his wife
- Princess Basma bint Talal, the groom's paternal great-aunt

==== Al-Yassin family ====
- Ilham Al-Yassin, the groom's maternal grandmother
  - Dina Al-Yassin and Sherif Zoubi, the groom's maternal aunt and uncle
  - Majdi Al-Yassin and Rym Haurani, the groom's maternal uncle and aunt

=== Relatives of the bride ===
- Khaled Al Saif and Azza Al Sudairi, the bride's parents
  - Faisal Al Saif, the bride's brother
  - Nayef Al Saif, the bride's brother
  - Dana Al Saif, the bride's sister

=== Foreign royalty ===
==== Members of reigning imperial and royal houses ====
- The Crown Prince of Bahrain (representing the King of Bahrain)
- Sheikh Nasser bin Hamad Al Khalifa of Bahrain
- (Belgium) The King of the Belgians
  - (Belgium) The Duchess of Brabant
- The Queen of Bhutan (representing the King of Bhutan)
- Princess Ashi Euphelma Choden Wangchuck of Bhutan
- The Sultan of Brunei
  - Prince 'Abdul Mateen of Brunei
- The Crown Prince and Crown Princess of Denmark (representing the Queen of Denmark)
- The Princess Takamado (representing the Emperor of Japan)
  - (Japan) Princess Tsuguko of Takamado
- Sheikh Ahmad Al Abdullah Al Sabah and Sheikha Muna Al-Klaib of Kuwait (representing the Emir of Kuwait)
- The Hereditary Prince and Hereditary Princess of Liechtenstein (representing the Prince of Liechtenstein)
- Prince Johann Wenzel and Princess Felicitas of Liechtenstein (Note: Not present at the religious ceremony at Zahran Palace)
- Prince Sébastien of Luxembourg (representing the Grand Duke of Luxembourg)
- The Yang di-Pertuan Agong and Raja Permaisuri Agong of Malaysia
- The King and Queen of the Netherlands
  - (Netherlands) The Princess of Orange
- The Crown Prince of Norway (representing the King of Norway)
- The Crown Prince of Oman (representing the Sultan of Oman)
- Sheikha Moza bint Nasser Al-Missned of Qatar (representing the Emir of Qatar)
  - Sheikh Khalifa bin Hamad Al Thani of Qatar
- King Juan Carlos I and Queen Sofía of Spain (representing the King of Spain)
- The Crown Princess of Sweden and the Duke of Västergötland (representing the King of Sweden)
- The Crown Prince of Abu Dhabi (representing the Emir of Abu Dhabi and President of the United Arab Emirates)
- The Prince and Princess of Wales (representing the King of the United Kingdom)
- (United Kingdom) Princess Beatrice and Edoardo Mapelli Mozzi

==== Members of non-reigning imperial and royal houses ====
- Tsar Simeon II and Tsaritsa Margarita of Bulgaria
  - (Bulgaria) The Prince of Preslav and Katharine Butler
- (Kingdom of Greece) Crown Prince Pavlos of Greece
- (Pahlavi Iran) Empress Farah Pahlavi of Iran
- The Custodian of the Crown and Prince Radu of Romania

=== Politicians ===
- Bisher Khasawneh, Prime Minister of Jordan and his wife Rana Sultan
- Ayman Safadi, Deputy Prime Minister of Jordan, Minister of Foreign Affairs

=== Foreign politicians and diplomats ===
- Ahmed Aboul Gheit, Secretary-General of the Arab League and his wife Leila Aboul Gheit
- Philippa Karsera, First Lady of Cyprus
- Entissar el-Sisi, First Lady of Egypt and her daughter Aya el-Sisi
- Abdul Latif and Shanaz Rashid, President and First Lady of Iraq
- Barham and Sarbagh Salih, former President and First Lady of Iraq
- Mustafa Al-Kadhimi, former Prime Minister of Iraq
- (Iraq) (Kurdistan Region) Masoud Barzani, former President of Iraqi Kurdistan
- (Iraq) (Kurdistan Region) Masrour Barzani, Prime Minister of Iraqi Kurdistan
- Matteo Renzi, former Prime Minister of Italy and his wife Agnese Landini
- Uhuru Kenyatta, former President of Kenya
- Najib Mikati, Prime Minister of Lebanon and his wife May Mikati
- Bilawal Bhutto, Foreign Minister of Pakistan
- Paul and Jeannette Kagame, President and First Lady of Rwanda
- David Cameron, former Prime Minister of the United Kingdom and his wife Samantha Cameron
- Jill Biden, First Lady of the United States and her daughter Ashley Biden
- (United States) Nancy Pelosi, Member of the U.S. House of Representatives and her husband Paul Pelosi

=== Other notable guests ===
- Carole Middleton
  - Philippa and James Matthews
- Ivanka Trump and Jared Kushner
