= Keio University Hospital =

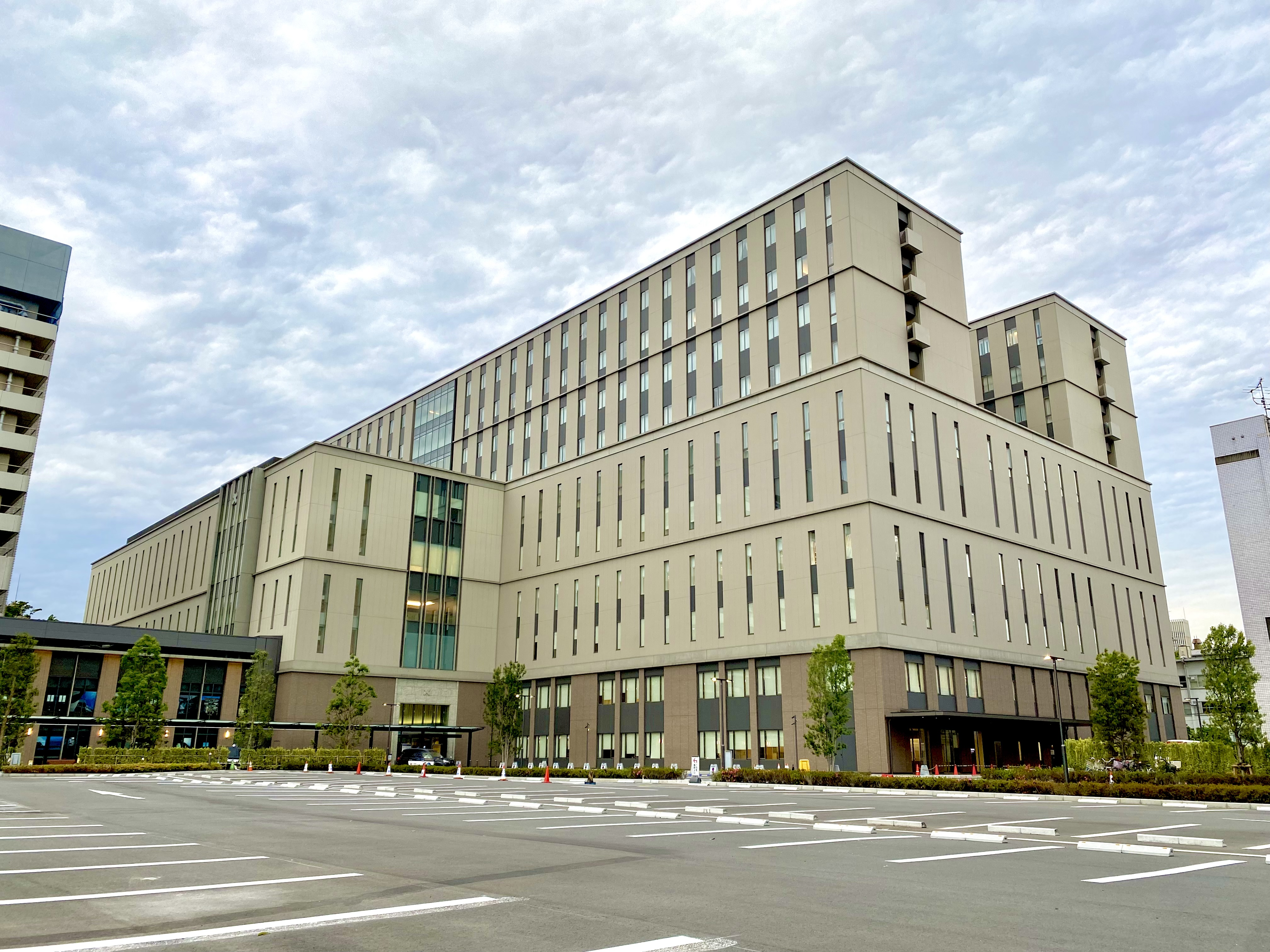
- The hospital building

Geography
- Location: 35 Shinanomachi, Shinjuku-ku, Tokyo, Japan

Organisation
- Type: Teaching
- Affiliated university: Keio University

Services
- Emergency department: Yes
- Beds: 950

Helipads
- Helipad: Yes
Number	Length		Surface
Number	ft	m	Surface
1			Concrete

History
- Opened: 1920

Links
- Website: https://www.hosp.keio.ac.jp/en/

Keio University Hospital (慶應義塾大学病院, Keio Gijuku Daigaku Byouin) is an academic health science centre and tertiary referral hospital located in Shinjuku, Tokyo, Japan. The hospital is part of the Keio University.

== Overview ==
Keio University Hospital was founded in 1920 with the dedicated efforts of Kitasato Shibasaburo, the hospital's first director, who had received research support from Yukichi Fukuzawa, the founder of Keio Gijuku (Keio University). As of 2019, the hospital has a total of 960 beds.

Many celebrities, notable figures, and politicians have received medical care at Keio University Hospital. Among them, Prince Takamado (Norihito), Yujiro Ishihara, Masako Natsume, Fujiko F. Fujio, Taro Okamoto, Shusaku Endo, Kakuei Tanaka, Izumi Sakai, Cha Kato, and Shinzo Abe were known to have been treated here.

== See also ==
- List of university hospitals
- List of hospitals in Japan
