= Hisako, Princess Takamado =

Japanese princess (born 1953)

Hisako
- Princess Takamado
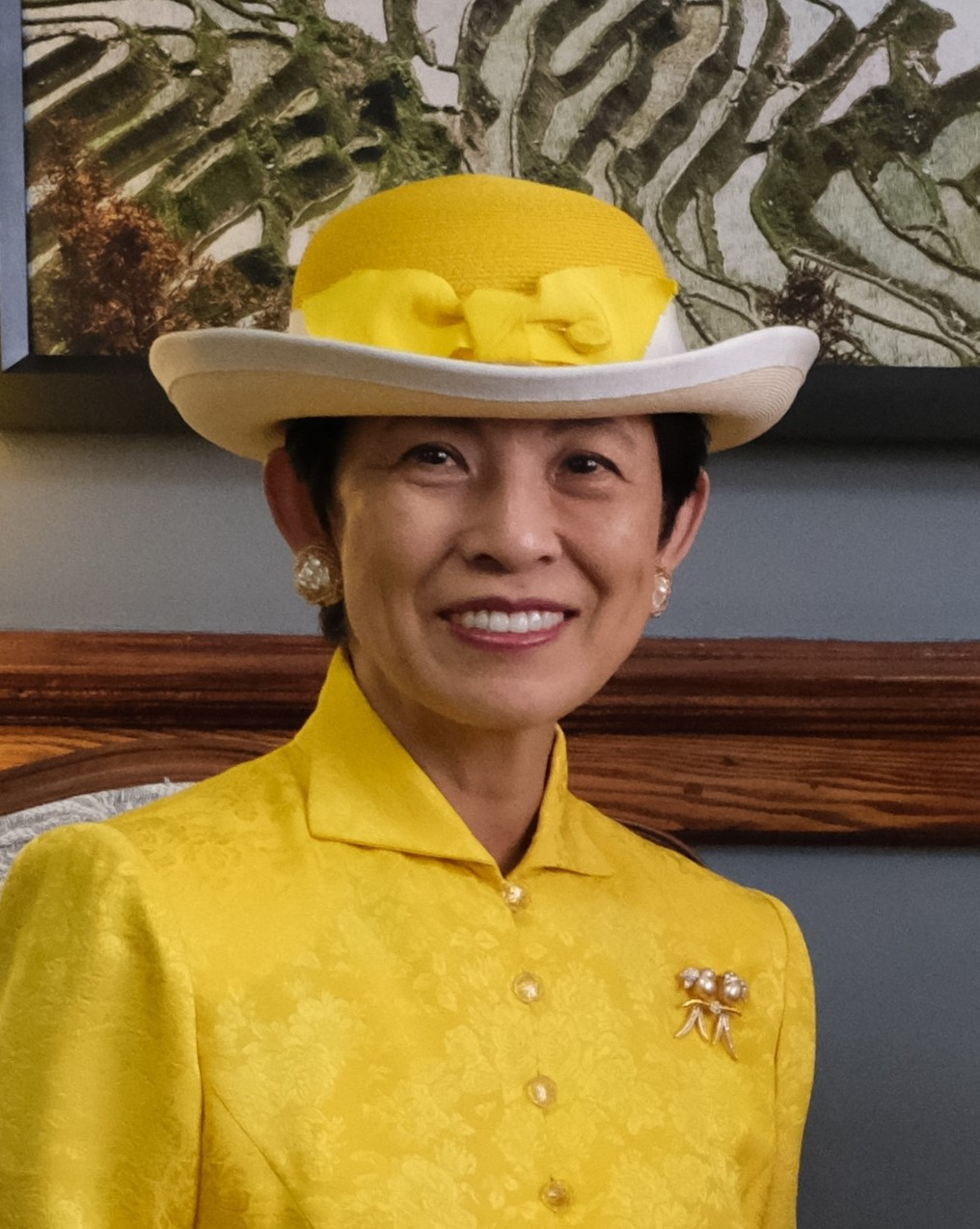
- Hisako in 2019
- Born: Hisako Tottori (鳥取久子); 10 July 1953 (age 73); Shirokane, Minato, Tokyo, Japan
- Spouse: Norihito, Prince Takamado (m. 1984; died 2002)
- Issue: Princess Tsuguko of Takamado; Noriko Senge; Ayako Moriya
- House: Imperial House of Japan (by marriage)
- Father: Shigejiro Tottori
- Mother: Fumiko Tomoda

Hisako, Princess Takamado (憲仁親王妃久子, Norihito Shinnōhi Hisako) (born Hisako Tottori (鳥取久子, Tottori Hisako); 10 July 1953), is a member of the Japanese imperial family as the widow of Norihito, Prince Takamado.

== Background and education ==
Hisako was born on 10 July 1953 in Shirokane, Minato, Tokyo. She is the eldest daughter of Japanese industrialist Shigejiro Tottori. Her mother, Fumiko Tottori (née Tomoda), died on 18 July 2023 at the age of 96. Hisako accompanied her father to England, where he was transferred for work, and while still a child became fluent in the English language. She subsequently graduated from Girton College, Cambridge in 1975 with undergraduate degrees in anthropology and archaeology. On her return to Japan, she obtained a position working for a translation company, but soon returned to England to learn about legal terminology used in statutes. She returned to Japan again in 1982. After her return, she was hired to assist Prince Mikasa as an interpreter and assistant at the 31st International Asian-North African Cultural Symposium. Princess Takamado received a PhD in arts from the Osaka University of Arts in February 2012.

== Marriage and family ==
On 23 April 1984, she attended a reception hosted by the Embassy of Canada in Tokyo, where she first met Prince Norihito of Mikasa, grandson of Emperor Taishō. He proposed on 20 May and the Imperial Household Council announced the engagement on 1 August 1984. The formal engagement ceremony made on 17 September 1984, and the wedding held on 6 December 1984. They have three daughters:

- Princess Tsuguko (承子女王, Tsuguko Joō; born 8 March 1986 at Aiiku Hospital in Tokyo)
- Princess Noriko (典子女王, Noriko Joō; born 22 July 1988 at Aiiku Hospital in Tokyo); following her marriage to Kunimaro Senge, a commoner, on 5 October 2014, Princess Noriko gave up her imperial title and left the Imperial Family as required by 1947 Imperial Household Law, took the surname of her husband and became known as "Noriko Senge" (千家典子, Senge Noriko).
- Princess Ayako (絢子女王, Ayako Joō; born 15 September 1990 at Aiiku Hospital in Tokyo); following her marriage to Kei Moriya, a commoner, on 29 October 2018, Princess Ayako gave up her imperial title and left the Imperial Family as required by 1947 Imperial Household Law, took the surname of her husband and became known as "Ayako Moriya" (守谷絢子, Moriya Ayako).

== Public life and activities ==
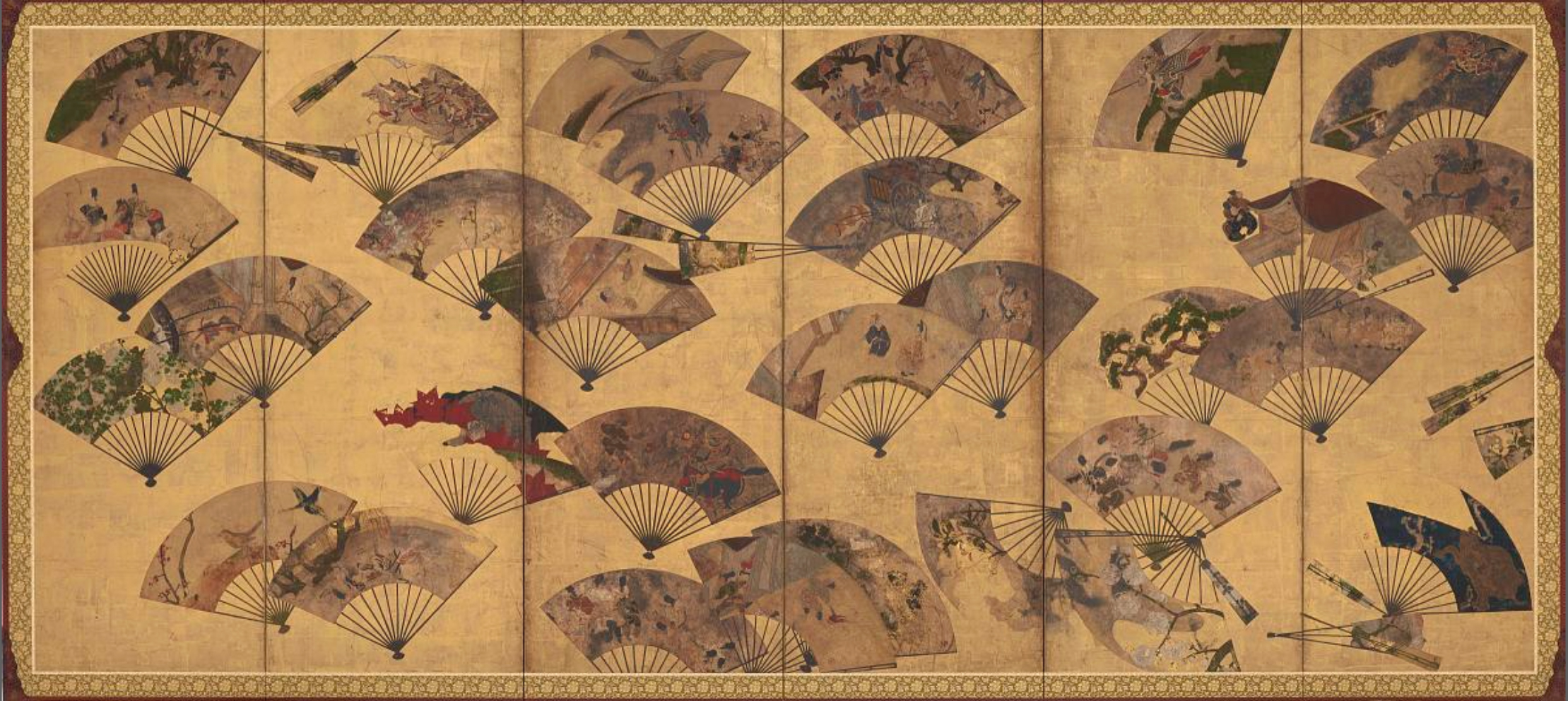
Fans, designated imperial personal emblem of Hisako

Princess Takamado during the 21st Pacific Science Congress in Okinawa, June 2007

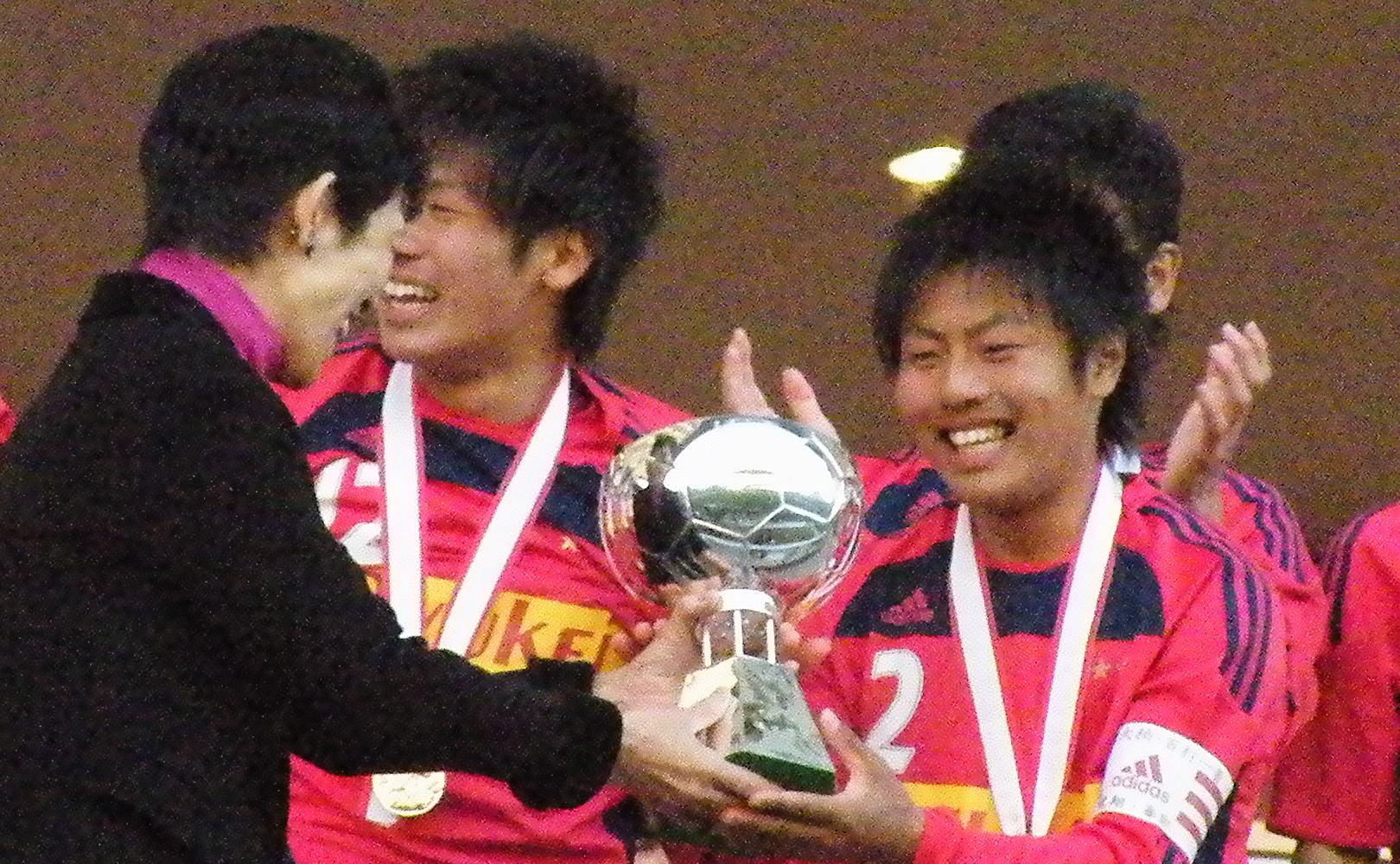
Princess Takamado presenting the Prince Takamado Trophy to the captain of the winning team at the 2013 Prince Takamado Cup U-18 Soccer League Championship, December 2013

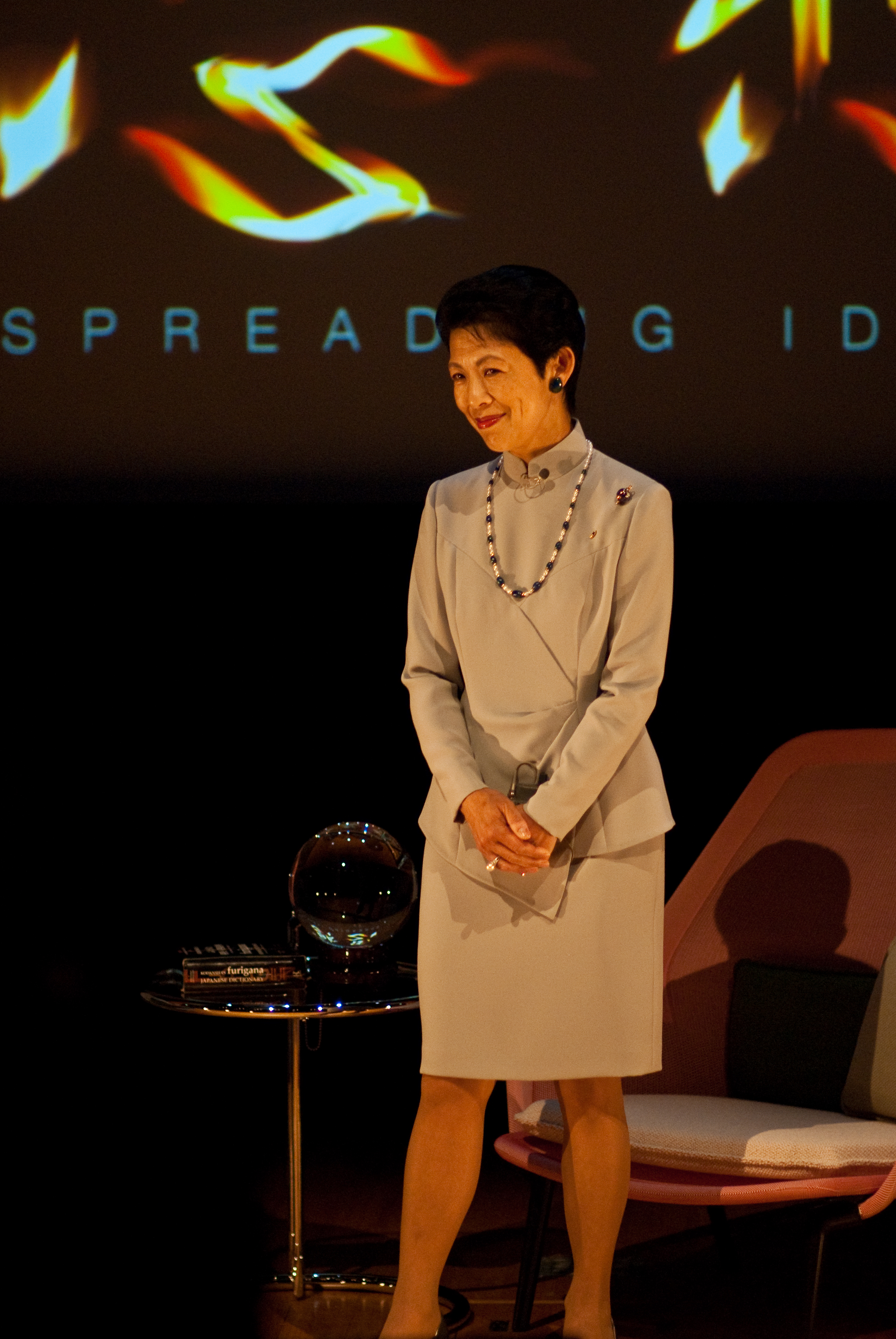
Princess Takamdo at an opening ceremony of TEDxTokyo 2009, May 2009

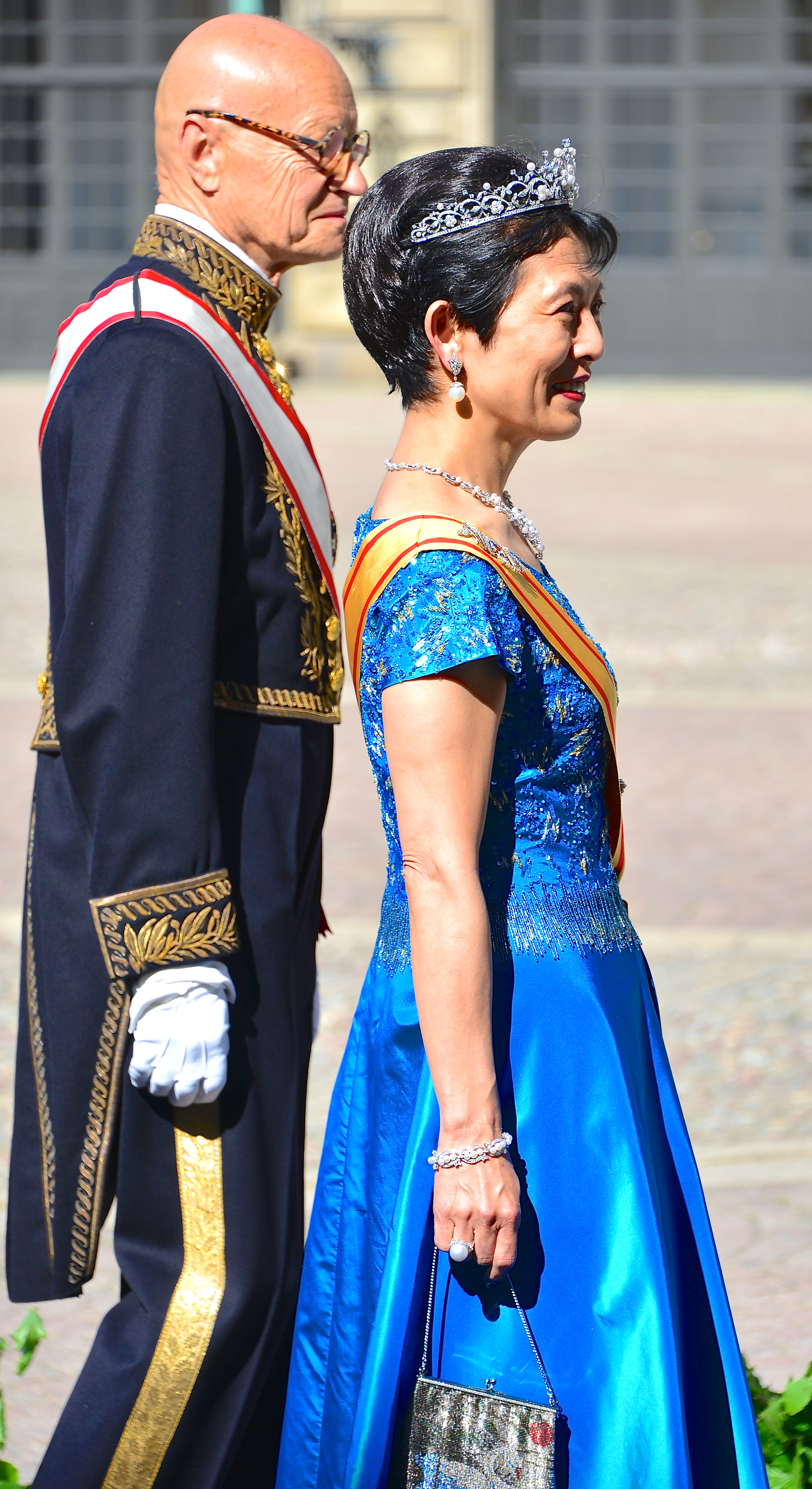
Princess Takamado on the way to the castle church at the Stockholm Palace before the Wedding of Princess Madeleine and Christopher O'Neill in Sweden, June 2013

Prince and Princess Takamado were the most widely traveled couple in the Japanese Imperial Family, visiting 35 countries together in 15 years to represent Japan on various functions. The Prince's last visits included Egypt and Morocco in May 2000, Hawaii in July 2001 (to promote the Japanese tea ceremony), and to South Korea from May to June 2002. The latter was in order to attend the Opening Ceremony of the 2002 FIFA World Cup Korea-Japan. The goodwill visit by the Prince and Princess to Korea was the first Japanese imperial visit since World War II, and was an important step in the promotion of friendly bilateral relations between Japan and South Korea. While in South Korea, the couple toured the country extensively, met with President Kim Dae-jung and ordinary South Koreans, and he visited the facilities for the physically disabled in South Korea that the Princess Masako Nashimoto had sponsored.

Prince Takamado died of ventricular fibrillation while playing squash with the Canadian ambassador, Robert G. Wright, at the Canadian Embassy, leaving a widow and three young daughters on 21 November 2002 at the age of 47. Since the Prince's death, Princess Takamado has been extremely active in a very large number of charitable organizations involving sports, cultural exchange and the environment, taking on all of the posts formerly held by her late husband, as well as numerous new posts. Since November 2002, the princess has served as the Honorary President of the Prince Takamado Trophy, All Japan-Middle School English Oratorical Contest.

In June 2003, she visited Dublin, Republic of Ireland for the 2003 Special Olympics World Summer Games. In June 2004, she made an official visit to Canada, traveling extensively across the nation as part of the 75th Anniversary of the formal diplomatic relations between Canada and Japan. During this visit, she received two honorary doctorates in Law, one from the University of Alberta and the other from the University of Prince Edward Island.

In March 2004, the Princess was elected to succeed Queen Noor of Jordan as honorary president of BirdLife International. In November 2004, she visited Bangkok, Thailand, to attend the 3rd IUCN World Conference as honorary president of BirdLife International. She visited Montevideo, Uruguay in 2008, and Buenos Aires, Argentina for the Birdlife World Conservation Conference. During this visit, she attended special high goal polo exhibition played by the Novillo Astrada brothers in her honor at the La Aguada Polo Club.

In June 2005, she visited Germany to attend the 2005 FIFA Confederations Cup, attending matches between Germany against Argentina, and Japan against Brazil. Afterwards, she visited Jordan to attend the royal wedding of Princess Badiya bint El Hassan. In November of the same year, returned to England for the Global Council Meeting of BirdLife International. In January 2006, she returned to Canada to attend the opening of the "Prince Takamado Gallery of Japan" at the Royal Ontario Museum. She also returned to Germany later that year in order to attend the 2006 FIFA World Cup.

In June 2013, she visited Sweden to attend the Wedding of Princess Madeleine and Christopher O'Neill. In July 2017, she visited Dublin, Republic of Ireland to celebrate the 60th anniversary of modern Ireland–Japan relations. In August 2019, she visited Edmonton, Canada to celebrate the 90th anniversary of diplomatic relations between Japan and Canada. In November 2022, she visited Qatar to watch 2022 FIFA World Cup.

In May–June 2023, she visited Jordan with her eldest daughter, Princess Tsuguko to attend the Wedding of Hussein, Crown Prince of Jordan, and Rajwa Al Saif.

In June 2026, she visited the United States to attend the 2026 FIFA World Cup. She also visited Mexico as part of the celebrations of the 1000th match in FIFA World Cup history between Tunisia and Japan.

== Health ==
In March 2020, Princess Takamado underwent surgery for acute appendicitis at the University of Tokyo Hospital. On 17 March, she was discharged after checking and verifying that the operation had gone well.

In November 2022, it was announced that Princess Takamado had tested positive for COVID-19 and would be convalescing at her residence. Her symptoms included fever and sore throat.

== Bibliography ==
The Princess is the author of two children's books published in English; Katie and the Dream-Eater (OUP, 1996) and Lulie the Iceberg (OUP, 1998).

== Titles and styles ==
Mon of the Takamado branch of the Imperial Family

Since her marriage, Hisako is styled as Her Imperial Highness The Princess Takamado.

== Honours ==
=== National honours ===
- Japan: Grand Cordon of the Order of the Precious Crown (6 December 1984)
- Japan: Dame of the Decoration of the Red Cross
- Japan: Recipient of the Red Cross Medal

=== Foreign honours ===
- Portugal : Grand Cross of the Order of Prince Henry (2 December 1993)
- Spain : Dame Grand Cross of the Order of Isabella the Catholic (8 November 2008)
- Sweden : Recipient of the 70th Birthday Badge Medal of King Carl XVI Gustaf (30 April 2016)

=== Honorary degrees ===
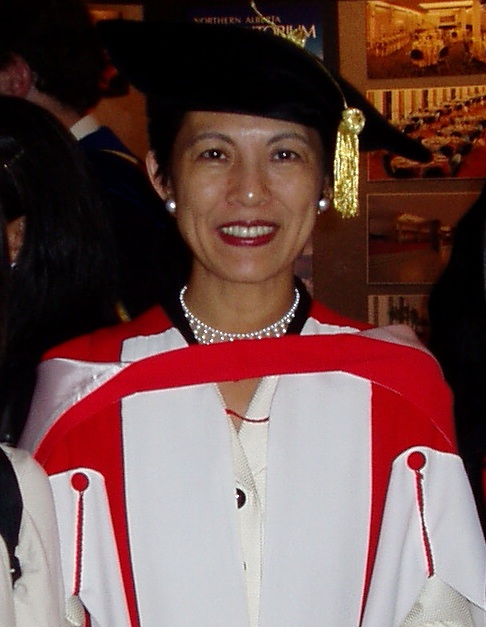
Princess Takamado shortly after receiving an honorary doctorate and delivering the convocation speech at the University of Alberta, June 2004

- Honorary degree in Law (University of Alberta, 2004)
- Honorary degree in Law (University of Prince Edward Island, 2004)
- Honorary degree in Education (Hannam University, 2014)
- Honorary degree (Josai University, 2015)

=== Honorary positions ===
- Patron of the Federation of Japan Amateur Orchestras Corp
- Honorary President of the Ikebana International
- Honorary President of the Amateur Rubberball Baseball Association of Japan
- Honorary President of the Japan Fencing Federation
- Honorary President of the Marine Rescue Japan
- Honorary President of the Japan Hockey Association
- Honorary Patron of the Japan Football Association
- Honorary President of the Japan Spanish Society
- Honorary Patron of Center for Promotion of Folk-Performing Arts
- Honorary President of the Inamori Foundation
- Honorary President of the Japan Sailing Federation
- Honorary Patron of the Japan National Student Association Fund
- Honorary Patron of the Asiatic Society of Japan
- Honorary Patron of Les Amies de Langue Française
- Honorary Governorship of the Japan-Egypt Association
- Honorary President of BirdLife International
- Honorary President of the International Kyudo Federation
- Honorary President of the Prince Takamado Memorial Foundation for Japan-Korea Exchange
- Honorary Chairman of the International Education Center Supporter Association
- Honorary Patron of Ninnakai (Ninnaji Temple, Kyoto)
- Honorary Patron of Chuguji Hosankai (Chuguji Temple, Nara)
- Honorary Patron of The AED Foundation of Japan
- Honorary Patron of Japan Heart Foundation
- Honorary President of Japan Sea Cadet Federation
- Honorary President of the Japan Volleyball Association
- Honorary Patron of the Rifle Association Foundation of Japan
- Honorary Patron of the Japan Handball Association
- Honorary Patron of the Mamasan Volleyball Federation Nippon
- Honorary Chairman of the International Education Center Supporter Association
- Honorary Vice-President of the Japanese Red Cross Society
- Honorary Patron for Asia, Bird life International's Rare Bird Club
- Guest Professor of Osaka University of Arts

== Issue ==
Name	Birth	Marriage		Issue
Name	Birth	Date	Spouse	Issue
Princess Tsuguko of Takamado	8 March 1986 (age 40)			
Noriko Senge (Princess Noriko of Takamado)	22 July 1988 (age 38)	5 October 2014	Kunimaro Senge	
Ayako Moriya (Princess Ayako of Takamado)	15 September 1990 (age 36)	28 October 2018	Kei Moriya	three sons
