= Embassy of Oman, Tokyo =

Embassy of Oman in Tokyo, Japan سفارة سلطنة عمان في طوكيو في اليابان
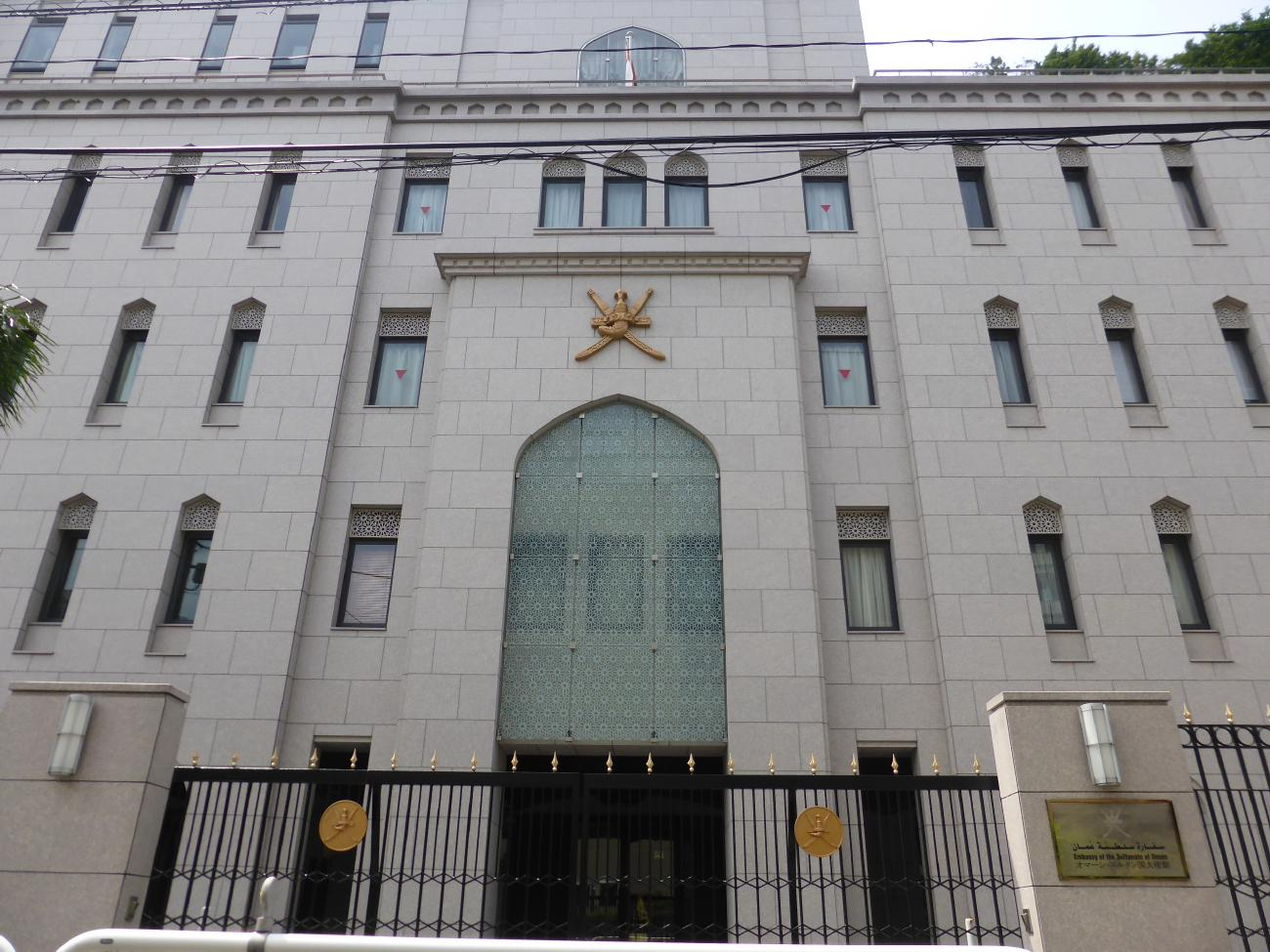
- Location: Tokyo
- Address: 4-2-17 Hiroo, Shibuya-ku, Tokyo 150-0012 Japan
- Coordinates: 35°39′14.83″N 139°43′17.75″E
- Ambassador: H.E. Dr. Mohamed Said Al Busaidi

The Embassy of the Sultanate of Oman in Tokyo, Japan (Arabic: سفارة سلطنة عمان في طوكيو في اليابان) is the Sultanate of Oman's diplomatic mission to Japan since 1979. The Ambassador is HE Dr. Mohamed Said Al Busaidi, who is also Oman's non-resident Ambassador to Australia and New Zealand. The embassy is located at 4-2-17 Hiroo, Shibuya-ku, Tokyo 150-0012, Japan.

The current embassy building was designed and built by Yasui Architects and Engineering Inc. The building was completed in 2009, and is a seven story white stone building featuring a golden emblem showing Oman’s traditional khanjar dagger over two crossed swords above the entrance.

The embassy is used by Oman and other Gulf states to hold bilateral and multilateral meetings, and events designed to promote the Arab world in Japan, and to increase trading ties between the two countries.
