= Princess Rajwa Al Hussein =

Saudi member of the Jordanian royal family (born 1994)

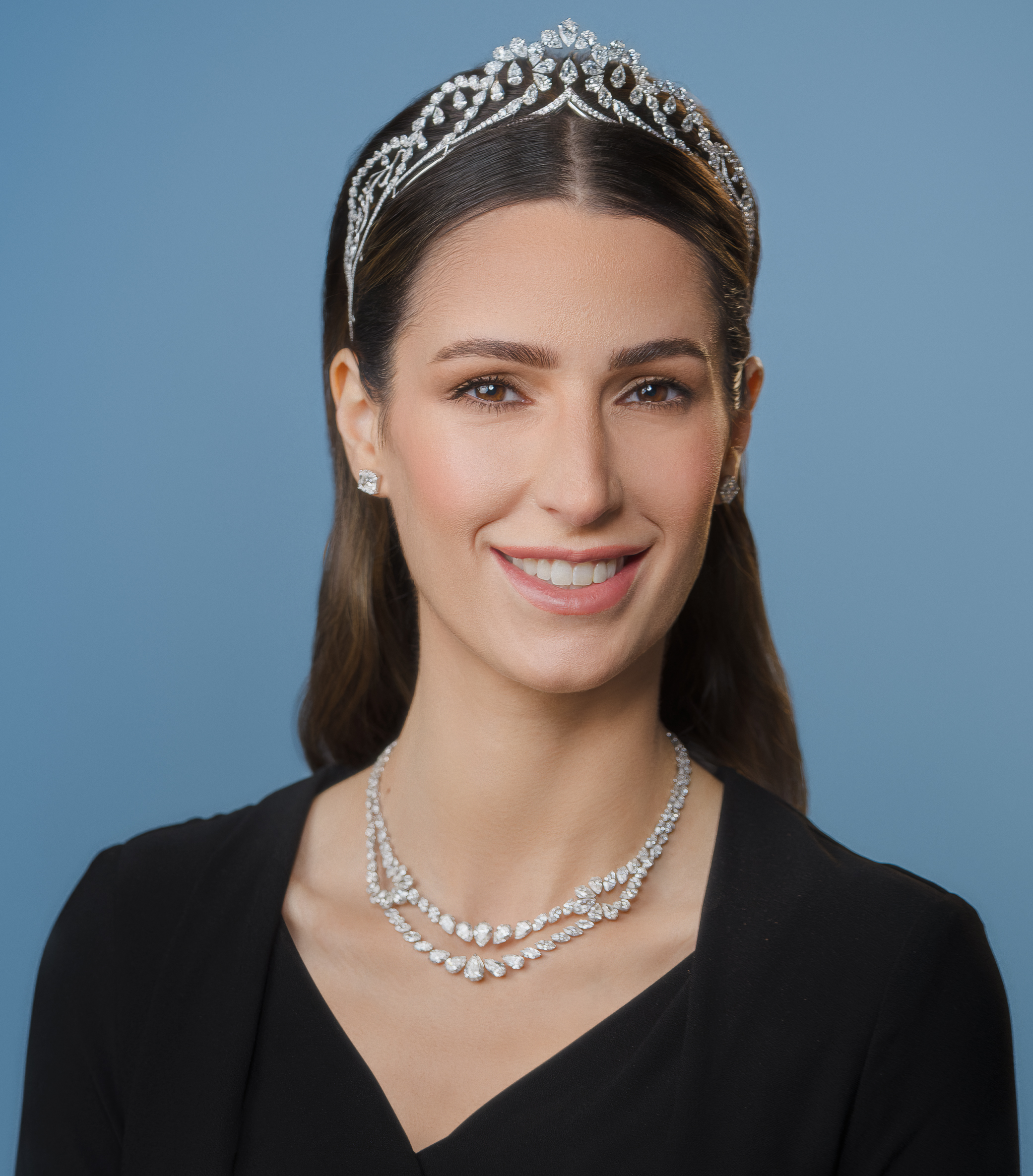
- Rajwa in 2024
- Born: Rajwa bint Khaled bin Musaed bin Saif bin Abdulaziz Al Saif; 28 April 1994 (age 32); Riyadh, Saudi Arabia
- Spouse: Hussein, Crown Prince of Jordan (m. 2023)
- Issue: Princess Iman
- Father: Khaled bin Musaed bin Saif bin Abdulaziz Al Saif
- Mother: Azza bint Nayef bin Abdulaziz bin Ahmed Al Sudairi
- Education: Syracuse University (BArch); Fashion Institute of Design & Merchandising (AA)

Princess Rajwa Al Hussein (Arabic: رجوة الحسين; born Rajwa bint Khaled bin Musaed bin Saif bin Abdulaziz Al Saif; 28 April 1994) is a Saudi member of the Jordanian royal family. She is married to Hussein, Crown Prince of Jordan, heir apparent to the Jordanian throne.

The couple's engagement was announced in August 2022 and they married in a ceremony in Amman on 1 June 2023. The couple has a daughter, Princess Iman. Born in Saudi Arabia, Princess Rajwa was previously trained as an architect. Since her marriage, she has joined the Crown Prince in his official engagements in Jordan and abroad.

== Early life and career ==
Rajwa bint Khaled bin Musaed bin Saif bin Abdulaziz Al Saif was born on 28 April 1994 in Riyadh, Saudi Arabia. She is the youngest of four children born to Saudi businessman Khaled Al Saif (1953–2024), president of the Al Saif Group, and his wife Azza Al Sudairi. She has three older siblings: Faisal, Nayef, and Dana. The Al Saif family descends from the sheikhs of the town of Al-Attar in the Sudair region, which historically belonged to the Subai tribe, one of the prominent tribal groups of central Arabia.

Her mother, Azza Al Sudairi, comes from the distinguished Al Sudairi family, the same lineage as King Salman of Saudi Arabia’s mother, Hussa bint Ahmed Al Sudairi, and his late wife, Sultana bint Turki Al Sudairi. Through her maternal line, Rajwa is therefore a first cousin twice removed of King Salman and a second cousin once removed of Crown Prince Mohammed bin Salman.

Her father, Khaled bin Musaed bin Saif bin Abdulaziz Al Saif, was a prominent businessman and founder of Al Seif Engineering Contracting, a major construction and development company involved in several large-scale infrastructure projects in Saudi Arabia and abroad. He earned a degree in civil engineering from the American University of Beirut, and later served as president of the Al Saif Group, a diversified conglomerate with interests spanning engineering, healthcare, and technology. Khaled Al Saif passed away in February 2024, a few months after his daughter’s royal wedding to Crown Prince Hussein of Jordan.

Rajwa completed her secondary education in Riyadh, she moved to the United States to pursue higher education, earning a Bachelor of Architecture degree from the Syracuse University School of Architecture in 2017. During her years at Syracuse, she was known as Rajwa Alseif. She notably organized a symposium on start-ups and sustainable development in desert environments, reflecting her long-standing interest in innovative urbanism and ecological design.

After completing her undergraduate studies, Rajwa continued her education at the Fashion Institute of Design & Merchandising in Los Angeles, where she obtained an Associate of Arts degree in visual communications in 2019. During this period, she gained practical experience working at the Los Angeles–based architecture firm Patterns Design, where she contributed to several modern design projects characterized by innovative material use and spatial experimentation. Upon returning to Riyadh, she joined the Designlab Experience design studio, where she specialized in interior environments and event design.

In addition to her native Arabic, Rajwa is fluent in English and French.

== Marriage and family ==
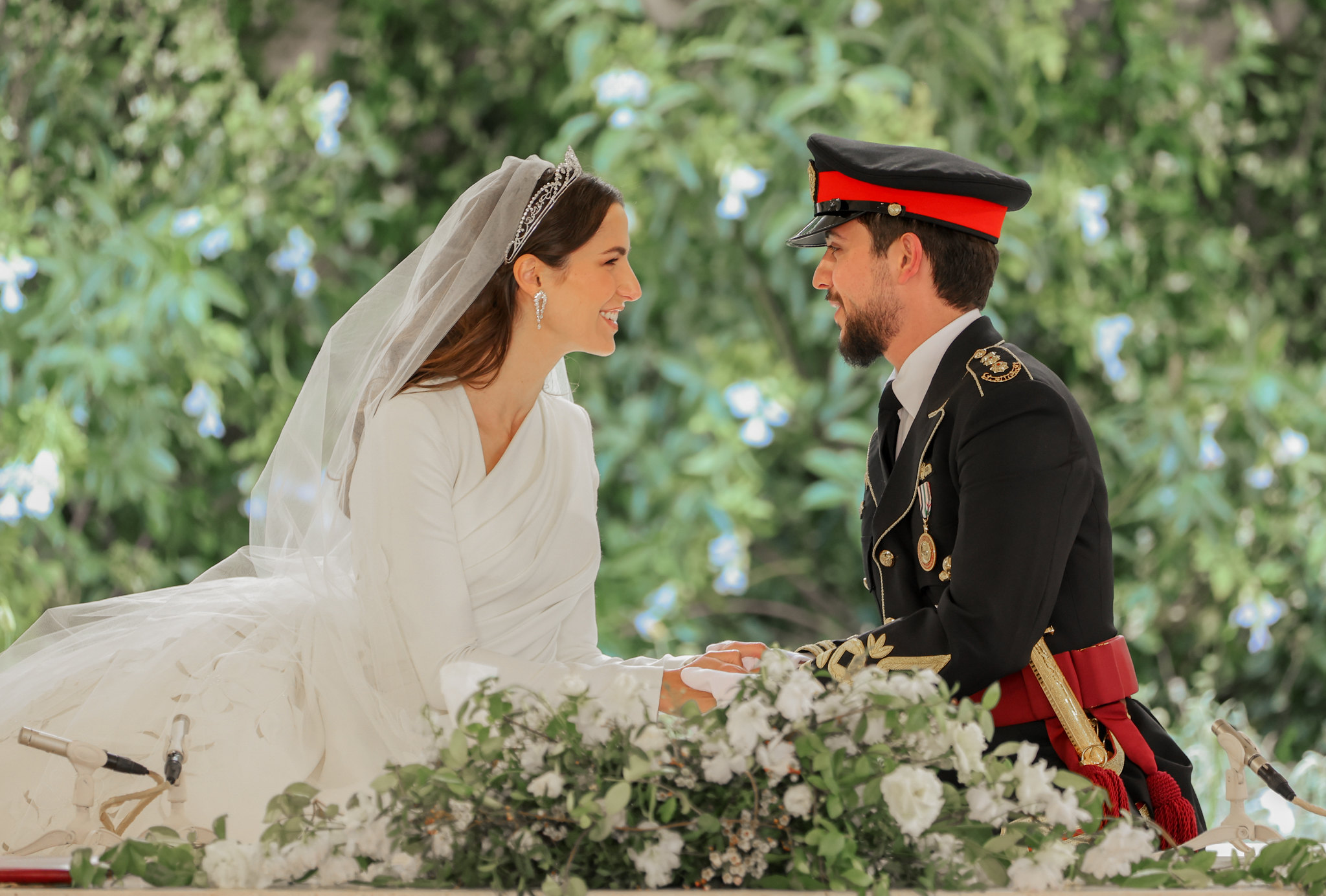
Rajwa and Hussein on their wedding day, June 2023

The Royal Hashemite Court announced Al Saif's engagement to Hussein, Crown Prince of Jordan, eldest son of King Abdullah II and Queen Rania of Jordan on 17 August 2022. The engagement ceremony took place at the home of Al Saif's father in Riyadh. The ceremony was attended by the King and Queen of Jordan, members of the Jordanian royal family, and members of the Al Saif family. On 22 May 2023, Rajwa's pre-royal wedding henna party was held at the Madareb Bani Hashem. She wore a dress designed by Saudi fashion brand Honayda.

The couple were married on 1 June 2023 at Zahran Palace. Rajwa wore a custom Elie Saab gown for the ceremony and a Dolce & Gabbana gown for the evening reception. By royal decree, Rajwa became known as Her Royal Highness Princess Rajwa Al Hussein upon her marriage.

On 3 August 2024, Rajwa gave birth to a daughter, Princess Iman bint Hussein, at King Hussein Medical Center in Amman. Since the Jordanian throne passes according to agnatic primogeniture, Princess Iman is not in the line of succession.

== Public life ==
Rajwa made her first official public appearance as Crown Prince Hussein's fiancée in October 2022 when she visited the Royal Covenant with Hussein and his great-uncle Prince Hassan bin Talal. She accompanied Hussein during a visit to the Scent of Colour initiative for the blind and visually impaired in January 2023, which marked their first official public engagement as a couple. In September that year, the couple met with US congress members in Washington DC, which marked their first public engagement since their wedding.

In January 2024 Rajwa accompanied Crown Prince Hussein on his official visit to Singapore. In June, she attended King Abdullah II's Silver Jubilee national celebration event in Amman. In July, She visited Digitales a Jordanian tech company with Crown prince hussein In November, she attended the inauguration of Jordan's 20th parliamentary session led by King Abdullah II in Amman. In December, she and her husband visited the "Seeds of Hope Center", which deals with treating disorders in adults and children, in Amman.

In March 2025, she joined her husband during a visit at the "Children's Museum Jordan" in Amman to celebrate the iftar meal together with the orphans present. In October 2025, the princess accompanied her husband on an official working trip to France and the UK, she attended the opening of the 20th parliament session in Amman the same month. In November, she attended the 75th anniversary ceremony of the Jordan Football Association (JFA), alongside the Crown Prince.

In January 2026, the couple visited Jabal Amman publishers In May 2026, the princess attended AI session at the Tawasol Forum held by CPF In Red Sea with her husband. During the same month the couple visited ABB industrial and Vocational center in Berlin, Germany. Princess Rajwa attended Jordan’s 80th independence day celebrations at Al Husainiyah palace In Amman. In June, the Princess visited Repilt a Jordanian Ai development company in Silicon Valley,California with her husband. In August, Princess Rajwa attended the sixth Cohort Alhussein technical university graduation ceremony in Amman., and receiving the Top tawjihi Achievers for the Academic Year 2025-2026 in Basman Palace both with her husband. In October Princess Rajwa attended the 10th year Crown Prince Foundation anniversary ceremony. In November she attended the opening session of the 20th parliament in Amman., Princess Rajwa Patronized the Youth Health and Wellbeing forum at the Dead Sea her first ever solo engagement bringing together young people from across Jordan alongside government officials and health experts to voice health priorities and propose practical solutions for youth wellbeing.
