= Norihito, Prince Takamado =

Japanese prince (1954–2002)

Norihito
- Prince Takamado
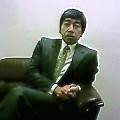
- Born: 29 December 1954; Kamiōsaki, Shinagawa, Tokyo, Japan
- Died: 21 November 2002 (aged 47); Keio University Hospital, Shinanomachi, Shinjuku, Tokyo, Japan
- Burial: 29 November 2002; Toshimagaoka Imperial Cemetery, Bunkyo, Tokyo
- Spouse: Hisako Tottori (m. 1984)
- Issue: Princess Tsuguko of Takamado; Noriko Senge; Ayako Moriya
- House: Takamado-no-miya
- Dynasty: Imperial House of Japan
- Father: Takahito, Prince Mikasa
- Mother: Yuriko Takagi

Norihito, Prince Takamado (高円宮憲仁親王, Takamado-no-miya Norihito Shinnō; 29 December 1954 – 21 November 2002) was a Japanese member of the Imperial House of Japan and the third son of Takahito, Prince Mikasa and Yuriko, Princess Mikasa. He was a first cousin of Emperor Akihito, and was seventh in line to the Chrysanthemum Throne at the time of his death.

== Education ==
The Prince was born in Prince Mikasa's family home at Tokyo. He graduated from the Department of Law of Gakushuin University in 1978. He studied abroad from 1978 to 1981 at Queen's University Faculty of Law in Kingston, Ontario, Canada. After his return to Japan, he served as administrator of the Japan Foundation from 1981 to 2002.

== Marriage and family ==
On 17 September 1984, the Prince became engaged to Hisako Tottori, eldest daughter of Shigejirō Tottori, whom he had met at a reception held by the Canadian Embassy in Tokyo. They married on 6 December 1984. He was born as Prince Norihito of Mikasa, and received the title Prince Takamado (Takamado-no-miya) and authorization to start a new branch of the Imperial Family on 1 December 1984 in celebration of his wedding. The couple had three daughters:

- Princess Tsuguko (承子女王, Tsuguko Joō; born 8 March 1986 at Aiiku Hospital in Tokyo)
- Princess Noriko (典子女王, Noriko Joō; born 22 July 1988 at Aiiku Hospital in Tokyo); following her marriage to Kunimaro Senge, a commoner, on 5 October 2014, Princess Noriko gave up her imperial title and left the Imperial Family as required by 1947 Imperial Household Law, took the surname of her husband and became known as "Noriko Senge" (千家典子, Senge Noriko).
- Princess Ayako (絢子女王, Ayako Joō; born 15 September 1990 at Aiiku Hospital in Tokyo); following her marriage to Moriya Kei, a commoner, on 29 October 2018, Princess Ayako gave up her imperial title and left the Imperial Family as required by 1947 Imperial Household Law, took the surname of her husband and became known as "Ayako Moriya" (守谷絢子, Moriya Ayako). On 6 August 2019, it was announced that Ayako was expecting her first child in the autumn. On 17 November 2019, she gave birth to a son, Jō Moriya, at Aiiku Hospital in Tokyo. On 21 April 2022, it was announced that Ayako was pregnant with her second child, whose birth would take place in the summer. She gave birth to her second son on 1 September 2022, at Aiiku Hospital. On 10 May 2024, Ayako gave birth to her third son, and their parents decided that his name would not be made public.

== Public service ==
Prince Takamado was honorary president of various charitable organizations involved with sponsorship of international exchange especially involving music, dance, and sports. He was often dubbed "The Sports Prince" (スポーツの宮さま, Supōtsu-no-miya-sama) in Japan. He supported a number of foreign language speech contests. He was also very much involved in environmental issues and environmental education. The Prince was an honorary member of AV Edo-Rhenania zu Tokio, a Roman Catholic student fraternity that is affiliated with the Cartellverband.

Prince and Princess Takamado were the most widely traveled couple in the Japanese imperial family, visiting 35 countries together in 15 years to represent Japan on various functions. The Prince's last visits included Egypt and Morocco in May 2000, Hawaii in July 2001 (to promote the Japanese tea ceremony), and to the Republic of Korea from May to June 2002. The latter was in order to attend the opening ceremony of the 2002 FIFA World Cup in South Korea and Japan. The goodwill visit by the Prince and Princess to Korea was the first Japanese imperial visit since World War II, and was an important step in the promotion of friendly bilateral relations between Japan and Korea. While in Korea, the couple toured the country extensively, met with President Kim Dae-jung and ordinary Koreans, and he visited the facilities for the physically disabled in South Korea that the Princess Nashimoto Masako had sponsored.

== Death ==
On 21 November 2002, while having a squash lesson together with the Canadian ambassador Robert G. Wright at the Canadian Embassy in Tokyo, the Prince collapsed from ventricular fibrillation and was rushed to Keio University Hospital, where he went into cardiac arrest and died at the age of 47.

The sudden death of one of the youngest and most active members of the Japanese Imperial Family shocked the nation. The Prince's funeral was held at Toshimagaoka Imperial Cemetery in northern Tokyo with around 900 people in attendance including members of the Imperial Family and politicians from Japan and other countries.

The Prince Takamado Cup, Japan's national youth football cup tournament, is named after him. The Japanese artwork and artifacts collection of the Royal Ontario Museum in Toronto is named the Prince Takamado Gallery of Japan in honour of his close connection with Canada.

== Titles, styles and honours ==
Styles of Prince Takamado
- Takamado no miya mon
- Reference style: His Imperial Highness
- Spoken style: Your Imperial Highness

- 29 December 1954 – 1 December 1984: His Imperial Highness Prince Norihito of Mikasa
- 1 December 1984 – 21 November 2002: His Imperial Highness Prince Takamado

=== National honours ===
- Grand Cordon of the Order of the Chrysanthemum (29 December 1974)

=== Foreign honours ===
- Greenland: Recipient of the Nersornaat Medal for Meritorious Service, 1st Class
- Italy: Knight Grand Cross of the Order of Merit of the Italian Republic (9 March 1982)

=== Honorary positions ===
- Honorary President of the Japan Football Association
- Honorary President of Japan Association of fencing
- Honorary President of Japan Squash Association
- Honorary President of Federation of All Japan Baseball
- Honorary President of the Japan Student Association Foundation
- Honorary President of Japan Society rescue poorly
- President of Federation of Japan Amateur Orchestras

== Issue ==
Name	Birth	Marriage		Issue
Princess Tsuguko of Takamado	8 March 1986			
Princess Noriko of Takamado	22 July 1988	5 October 2014	Kunimaro Senge	
Princess Ayako of Takamado	15 September 1990	29 October 2018	Kei Moriya	three sons

== Ancestry ==
Ancestors of Norihito, Prince Takamado

8. Mutsuhito, Emperor Meiji
4. Yoshihito, Emperor Taishō
9. Lady Naruko Yanagihara
2. Takahito, Prince Mikasa
10. Prince Michitaka Kujō
5. Lady Sadako Kujō
11. Ikuko Noma
1. Norihito, Prince Takamado
12. Masayoshi Takagi
6. Masanari Takagi
13. Saneko Matsudaira
3. The Hon. Yuriko Takagi
14. Tamemori Irie
7. Kuniko Irie
15. Nobuko Yanagihara

=== Patrilineal descent ===
Patrilineal descent

Imperial House of Japan

1. Descent prior to Keitai is unclear to modern historians, but traditionally traced back patrilineally to Emperor Jimmu
2. Emperor Keitai, ca. 450–534
3. Emperor Kinmei, 509–571
4. Emperor Bidatsu, 538–585
5. Prince Oshisaka, ca. 556–???
6. Emperor Jomei, 593–641
7. Emperor Tenji, 626–671
8. Prince Shiki, ???–716
9. Emperor Kōnin, 709–786
10. Emperor Kanmu, 737–806
11. Emperor Saga, 786–842
12. Emperor Ninmyō, 810–850
13. Emperor Kōkō, 830–867
14. Emperor Uda, 867–931
15. Emperor Daigo, 885–930
16. Emperor Murakami, 926–967
17. Emperor En'yū, 959–991
18. Emperor Ichijō, 980–1011
19. Emperor Go-Suzaku, 1009–1045
20. Emperor Go-Sanjō, 1034–1073
21. Emperor Shirakawa, 1053–1129
22. Emperor Horikawa, 1079–1107
23. Emperor Toba, 1103–1156
24. Emperor Go-Shirakawa, 1127–1192
25. Emperor Takakura, 1161–1181
26. Emperor Go-Toba, 1180–1239
27. Emperor Tsuchimikado, 1196–1231
28. Emperor Go-Saga, 1220–1272
29. Emperor Go-Fukakusa, 1243–1304
30. Emperor Fushimi, 1265–1317
31. Emperor Go-Fushimi, 1288–1336
32. Emperor Kōgon, 1313–1364
33. Emperor Sukō, 1334–1398
34. Prince Yoshihito Fushimi, 1351–1416
35. Prince Sadafusa Fushimi, 1372–1456
36. Emperor Go-Hanazono, 1419–1471
37. Emperor Go-Tsuchimikado, 1442–1500
38. Emperor Go-Kashiwabara, 1464–1526
39. Emperor Go-Nara, 1495–1557
40. Emperor Ōgimachi, 1517–1593
41. Prince Masahito, 1552–1586
42. Emperor Go-Yōzei, 1572–1617
43. Emperor Go-Mizunoo, 1596–1680
44. Emperor Reigen, 1654–1732
45. Emperor Higashiyama, 1675–1710
46. Prince Naohito Kanin, 1704–1753
47. Prince Sukehito Kanin, 1733–1794
48. Emperor Kōkaku, 1771–1840
49. Emperor Ninkō, 1800–1846
50. Emperor Kōmei, 1831–1867
51. Emperor Meiji, 1852–1912
52. Emperor Taishō, 1879–1926
53. Takahito, Prince Mikasa
54. Norihito, Prince Takamado
