= Zahran Palace =

Palace in Amman, Jordan

Coordinates: 31°57′20″N 35°54′9″E

Zahran Palace viewed from Zahran Street

Zahran Palace (Arabic: قصر زهران) is a palace in Amman, Jordan, built in 1957. It has hosted many royal events, such as the wedding of the current King and Queen of Jordan in 1993. In addition, celebrations of then Crown Prince Hamzah bin Hussein's wedding to Princess Noor was also held in the palace on 27 May 2004. On 1 June 2023, celebrations for Crown Prince Hussein bin Abdullah's wedding to Rajwa Al Saif took place at the palace.

In 1959, it was the scene of the meeting between the then Shah of Iran and the King of Jordan at the time.

The word zahran, which translates to "blooming flower" encompasses the palace's green ground and overlooks one of Amman's oldest neighborhoods, Jabal Amman.

The palace is located on Zahran Street (شارع زهران) in Amman.

It was the residence of Queen Zein al-Sharaf for many years. She died in 1994 in Switzerland.
