= Achta Saleh Damane =

Chadian journalist and politician

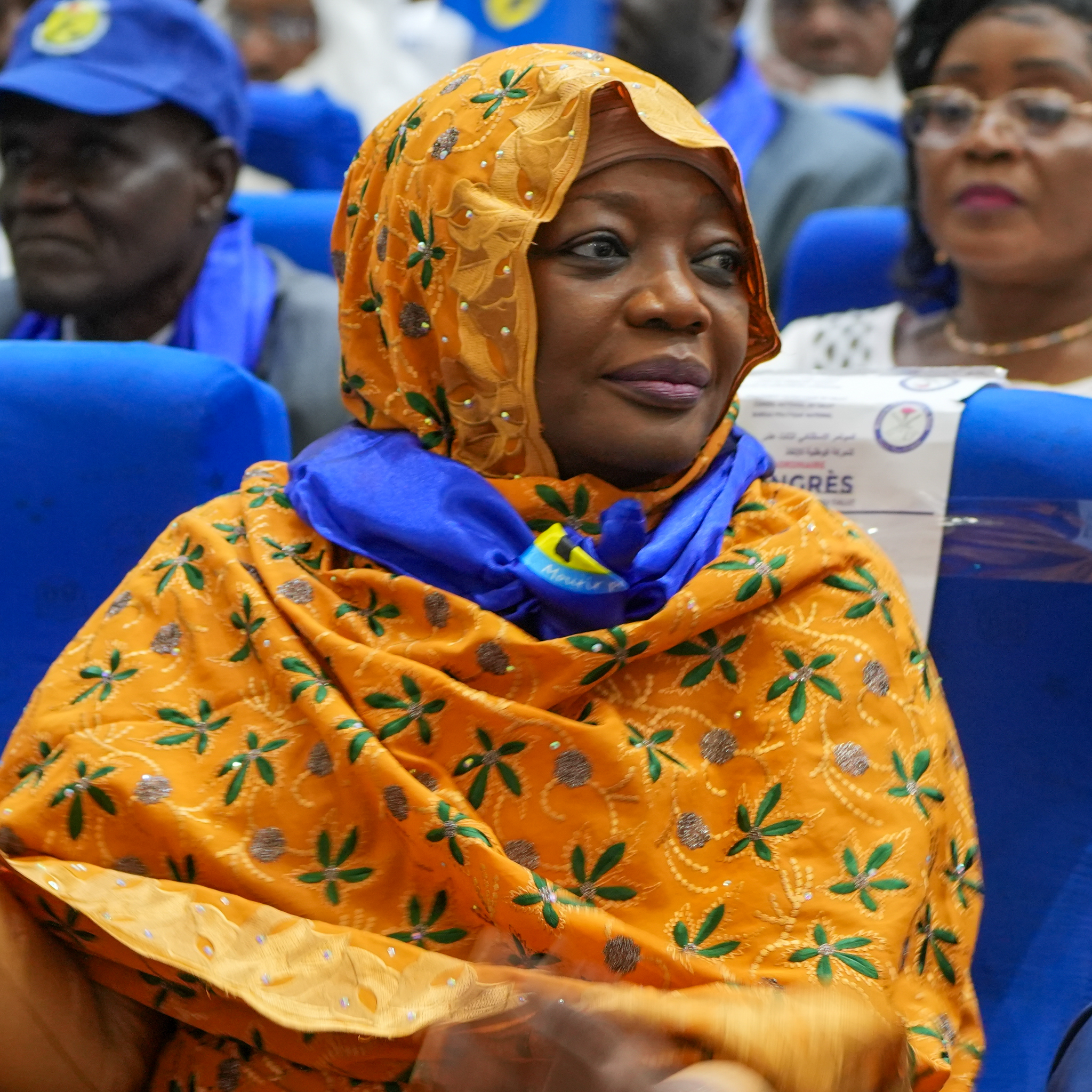
- Born: Damane
- Citizenship: Chad
- Occupations: Journalist; Politicalian
- Notable work: Vice-President of the High Council for Communication; Secretary of State for Foreign Affairs; General secretary of the Ministry of Communication; Secretary of State for National Education and Civic Promotion

Achta Saleh Damane is a Chadian journalist and politician.

Since June 30, 2019, Damane has been the Secretary of State for Foreign Affairs.

== Career ==
Damane has held several positions in the Chadian government, including Vice-President of the High Council for Communication, Secretary of State for Foreign Affairs, and general secretary of the Ministry of Communication.

From November 9, 2018 to June 30, 2019, Damane was the Secretary of State for National Education and Civic Promotion.
