= Ayako Moriya =

Former Japanese princess (born 1990)

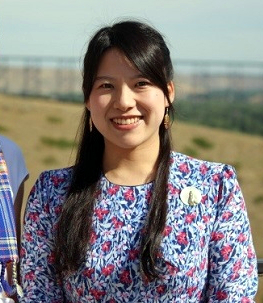
- Ayako in 2017
- Born: Princess Ayako of Takamado (絢子女王); 15 September 1990 (age 36); Aiiku Hospital, Minami-Azabu, Tokyo, Japan
- Spouse: Kei Moriya (m. 2018)
- Children: 3 sons
- Parents: Norihito, Prince Takamado (father); Hisako Tottori (mother)
- Relatives: Imperial House of Japan

Ayako Moriya (守谷 絢子, Moriya Ayako; born 15 September 1990), formerly Princess Ayako of Takamado (絢子女王, Ayako Joō), is a former member of the Imperial House of Japan and the youngest of three daughters of Norihito, Prince Takamado, and Hisako, Princess Takamado. She married Kei Moriya, a commoner, on 29 October 2018. As part of her marriage to a commoner, she gave up her imperial title and left the Japanese imperial family, as required by law.

== Biography ==
=== Childhood and studies ===
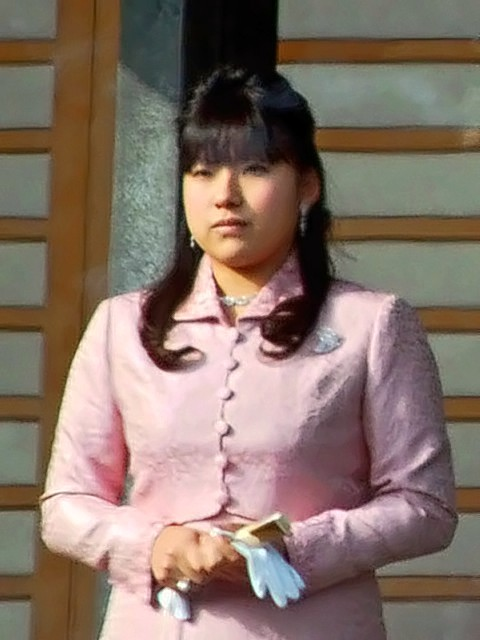
At the Chōwaden Reception Hall (2 January 2012)

Princess Ayako was born on 15 September 1990 at the Aiiku Hospital in Minami-Azabu, Tokyo. She was the first member of the Imperial Family to be born in the Heisei period, the era of her first cousin once removed, Emperor Akihito.

Princess Ayako attended the prestigious Gakushūin School for her primary, junior high, and high school education. While she was a student at Gakushūin Women's High School, in 2007, she visited New Zealand under a school-sponsored homestay program. In April 2009, she enrolled in the Josai International University (JIU), Faculty of Social Work Studies.

The Princess made short term visits to Camosun College in Victoria, British Columbia, Canada, as part of exchange tours with Josai International University in 2010 and 2011. In March 2013, Princess Ayako graduated Josai International University and was accepted into the graduate school. In September 2013, Princess Ayako returned to Camosun College to begin intensive English studies. She completed her studies at Camosun College in April 2015. She then spent time at the University of British Columbia before returning to Japan in August 2015. On 16 March, Princess Ayako of Takamado graduated from Josai International University and received a master's degree of social welfare. She is currently a research fellow at JIU's Faculty of Social Work Studies. She continues to attend ceremonies and functions at the palace when studies permit.

=== Engagement, marriage and children ===
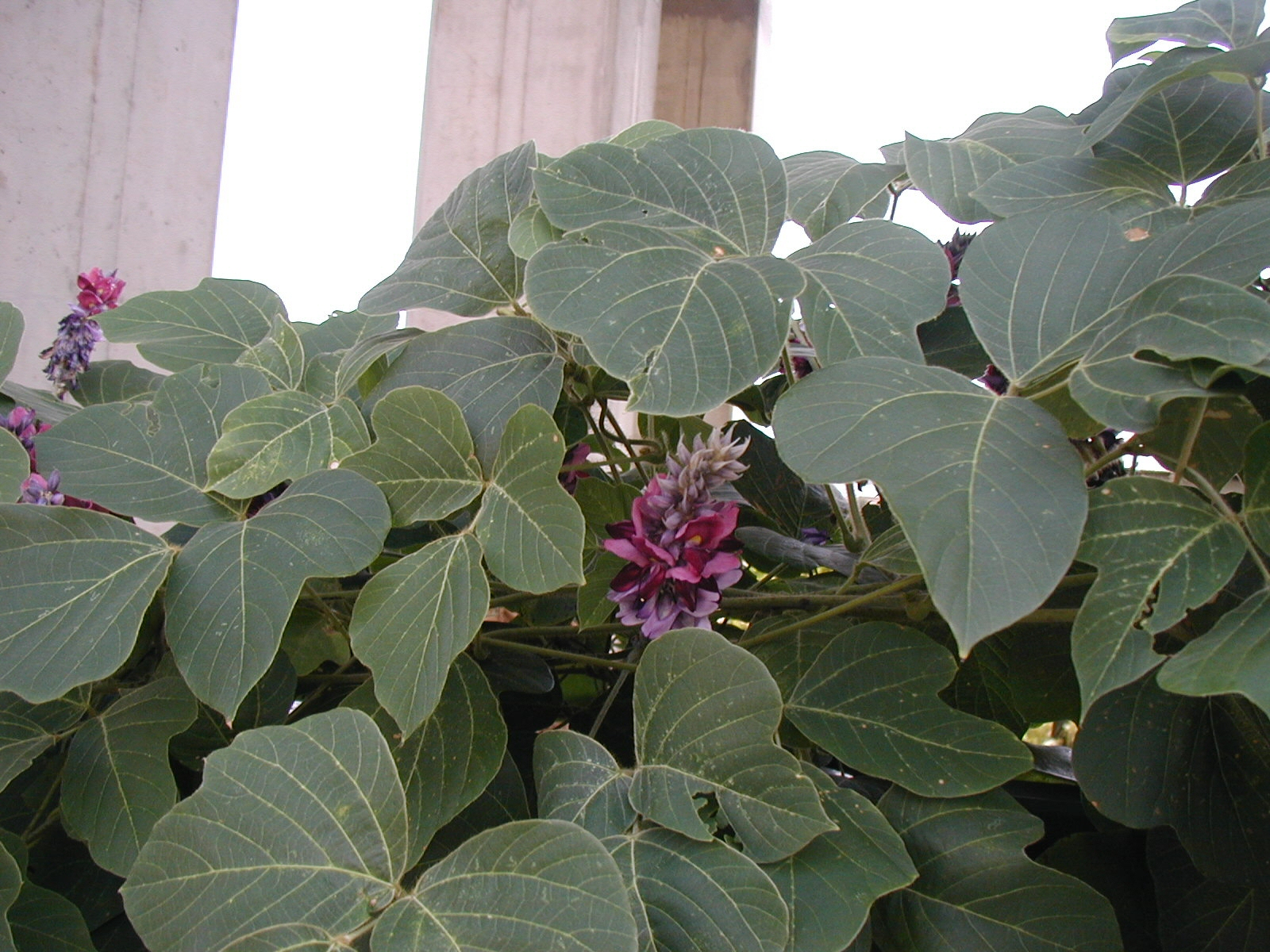
Kudzu vine, Pueraria montana var. lobata, designated imperial personal emblem of Ayako

Princess Ayako became formally engaged in a ceremony on 12 August 2018 to businessman Kei Moriya, a Keio University graduate who works for the shipping firm Nippon Yusen. The two were first introduced to each other in December 2017 by Ayako's mother, Princess Takamado, who has been a friend of Moriya's parents. The wedding took place on 29 October 2018 at Meiji Shrine. The wedding ceremony was held privately and featured Shinto rituals. The bride wore "a kimono robe and hakama pants", while the groom appeared in a morning suit and was given a top hat that had previously belonged to Ayako's father, Prince Takamado. A crowd of 1,000 well-wishers lined the area around the shrine. She renounced her royal status in accordance with the Imperial Household Law. A reception banquet also took place on 31 October at New Otani Hotel in Tokyo with the then Crown Prince and Crown Princess in attendance. The government decided to bestow a one-time ¥107 million ($950,000) allowance on the couple.

Unlike other princesses who renounced their honorary posts and patronages, Ayako retained her status as honorary president of the Canada-Japan Society and the Japan Sea Cadet Federation. The decision seems to be made due to the shrinking size of the imperial family, although the Imperial Household Agency denied playing an active role in making the decision and described it as "an agreement between the princess and the two organizations".

On 6 August 2019, it was announced that Ayako was expecting her first child in the autumn. On 17 November 2019, she gave birth to a son, Jō Moriya, at Aiiku Hospital in Tokyo. She gave birth to her second son, Kai Moriya, on 1 September 2022, at Aiiku Hospital. On 10 May 2024, Ayako gave birth to her third son, his name has not been made public.

== Titles and styles ==
Styles of Princess Ayako of Takamado (before her marriage)
- Takamado no miya mon
- Reference style: Her Imperial Highness
- Spoken style: Your Imperial Highness

- 15 September 1990 – 29 October 2018: Her Imperial Highness Princess Ayako of Takamado
- 29 October 2018 – present: Mrs. Kei Moriya

== Ancestry ==
Ancestors of Ayako Moriya

16. Mutsuhito, Emperor Meiji
8. Yoshihito, Emperor Taishō
17. Lady Naruko Yanagihara
4. Takahito, Prince Mikasa
18. Prince Kujō Michitaka
9. Lady Sadako Kujō
19. Noma Ikuko
2. Norihito, Prince Takamado
20. Masayoshi Takagi
10. Masanari Takagi
21. Saneko Matsudaira
5. The Hon. Yuriko Takagi
22. Tamemori Irie
11. Kuniko Irie
23. Nobuko Yanagihara
1.Princess Ayako of Takamado
12. Tamesaburo Tottori
6. Shigejiro Tottori
13. Hisashi Tottori
3. Hisako Tottori
14. Jiro Tomoda
7. Fumiko Tomoda
15. Moriko Tomoda
