= Julie Meyer =

Swiss-based American businesswoman

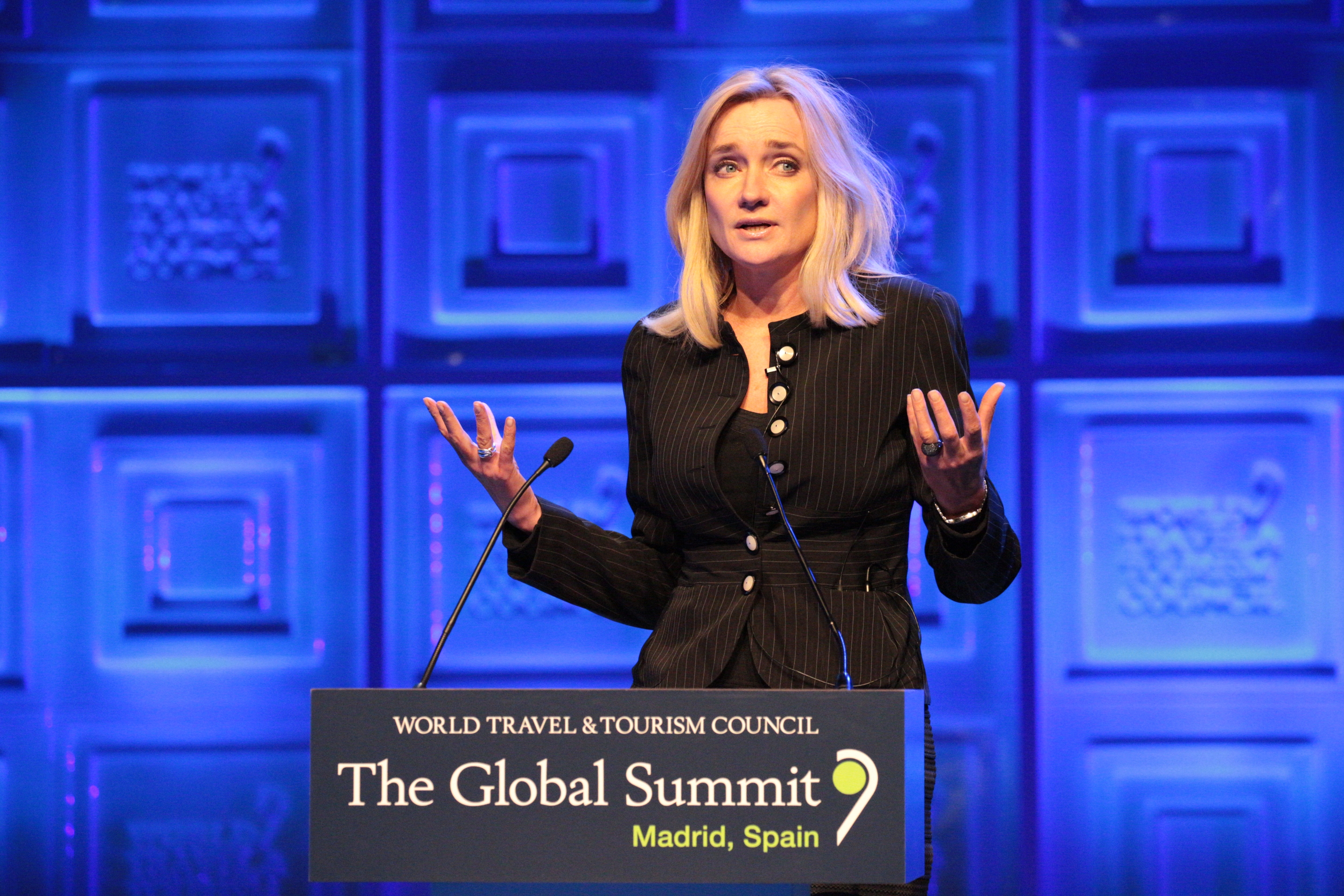
- Meyer in 2015
- Born: 28 August 1966 (age 60); Dearborn, Michigan U.S.
- Education: Valparaiso University; INSEAD
- Occupations: CEO; Author
- Years active: 1998–present
- Website: juliemariemeyer.com

Julie Marie Meyer is an American businesswoman.

== Early life and education ==
Meyer was born in Dearborn, Michigan.

== Career ==
Meyer moved to London in 1998 and worked at NewMedia Investors (later Spark Ventures) for one year. In the same year, Meyer co-founded First Tuesday, a forum to connect entrepreneurs with investors, which was sold in 2000 before being dissolved in 2001.

In August 2000, Meyer founded the investment advisory firm Ariadne Capital. In 2010, Ariadne Capital launched the Ariadne Capital Entrepreneurs (ACE) Fund, which has since been dissolved.

In 2009, she was a panelist in the online version of Dragon's Den. In 2010, Meyer was selected as one of 26 business people tasked with advising the British government on business policies to encourage entrepreneurship in the United Kingdom.

In 2012, Meyer was part of an advisory committee led by entrepreneur James Caan, called StartUp Loans, that was funded with £82.5 million.

Since 2018, Meyer has been the sole director of Viva investment Partners AG, a company registered in Switzerland, managing a UK-registered investment vehicle with negative shareholder equity which has since been dissolved via compulsory strike-off.

=== Legal and regulatory issues ===
In 2014, Ariadne Capital hired the public relations firm Lansons Communications. A Lansons employee contacted Wikipedia and the communication was posted on the Talk page of the Julie Meyer article. Ariadne filed a lawsuit against Lansons for more than £100,000 in damages, and Lansons counterclaimed for about £76,000 in unpaid fees. The litigation was settled, with an undisclosed sum paid to Lansons.

In 2015, Ariadne Capital was ordered to pay £50,000 after a contract dispute related to StartUp Loans was heard in court.

In 2016, Ariadne paid a £64,500.90 judgment, as ordered, after a contract dispute with a former employee.

In April 2018, a summons was not successfully served on Meyer in a case in Malta, in which Meyer claimed to be attempting to pay employees, and her attorney confirmed the money was available and would be paid. By May 2018, the summons had still not been successfully served on Meyer, and the Malta court indicated the case would continue until Meyer or her co-defendant appeared in a criminal case, regardless of whether the payments were made.

On 11 May 2018, the Malta Financial Services Authority (MFSA) suspended the investment services license of Ariadne Capital Malta Limited with immediate effect, alleging multiple "serious breaches of license conditions".

In February 2022, Meyer was given a six-month suspended sentence for contempt of court by the High Court in the UK, for failure to appear in court hearings or follow court orders, in a case brought by attorneys Farrer & Co, based on allegations of unpaid fees. Meyer unsuccessfully appealed the suspended sentence.

On 2 August 2025, King Charles III cancelled her MBE award, for "bringing the honours system into disrepute".

== Awards and honours ==
- 2000: EY Entrepreneur of the Year - UK winners
- 2002: WEF/Global Leaders for Tomorrow
- 2012: Member of the Order of the British Empire for Services to Entrepreneurship, cancelled by King Charles III in 2025 for "Bringing the Honours System into Disrepute".
- 2014: Honorary Degree from Warwick University, revoked in 2022.
- 2020: Bronze Stevie Award from the Stevie Award For Women in Business.
