= Enterprise Capital Fund =

UK Government venture capital investment programme

Enterprise Capital Fund is a British government financial programme that provides venture capital funding to Start-up companies that is operated by the British Business Bank.

It was established in 2006 by the UK governments Department for Business, Innovation and Skills (BIS) in the United Kingdom to address a market weakness in the provision of equity finance to UKs small and medium enterprises (SMEs).

Government funding is used alongside private sector funds to establish funds that operate within the "equity gap"; targeting investments of up to £5 million that have the potential to provide a good commercial return.

== History ==
The first five funds supported under the scheme were launched in 2006-7 following a pathfinder competition. A further three funds were awarded ECF status in 2007.

As of 1 April 2008, responsibility for the management of ECFs along with BIS's other equity funds and the Small Firms Loan Guarantee (SFLG) was transferred to a new body, Capital for Enterprise Limited (CfEL). This change did not change the nature of the funds or their policy objectives.

CfEL was incorporated in March 2007 as a private limited company wholly owned by BIS, and commenced actively trading in April 2008. It was an asset management business specialising in designing and managing support programmes for SME finance. Its position in the SME finance markets provided it with a unique ability to inform and implement Government policy on those markets.

In November 2013, Enterprise Capital Funds came in for scrutiny from the European Commission after several UK government-backed funds were found to be investing in SMEs beyond the guidelines permitted by EU law. One implication was that such businesses could have been forced to hand back millions of pounds to HM Treasury.

On 1 October 2013, CfEL became part of the British Business Bank, which is now responsible for the management of all of CfEL's financial schemes, including ECFs.

As of November 2019, 29 ECFs had been launched.

== Approved funds ==
Funds as of March 2017 were:

- Accelerated Digital Ventures
- Active ECF
- Amadeus and Angels Seed Fund
- Catapult Growth Fund
- Dawn Enterprise Capital Fund
- Edge ECF
- Entrepreneur First Next Stage Fund
- Episode 1 Ventures
- Foresight Nottingham Fund
- IQ Capital Fund I
- Longwall Ventures ECF
- MMC Enterprise Capital Fund
- Notion Capital Fund 2
- Oxford Technology Management
- Panoramic ECF 1
- Passion Capital ECF
- Seraphim Capital Fund
- Seraphim Space Fund
- Sustainable Technology Partnership
