= Capital for Enterprise =

Capital for Enterprise (CfEL)
- Company type: State-owned enterprise
- Industry: Financial services
- Founded: April 1, 2008
- Founder: British government
- Defunct: 2012
- Fate: Restructured
- Successor: British Business Bank
- Headquarters: London, United Kingdom
- Area served: United Kingdom
- Products: Venture capital, loan guarantees, and business advice
- Owner: Department for Business, Innovation and Skills
- Website: www.capitalforenterprise.gov.uk

Capital for Enterprise Limited (CfEL) was a limited company in the United Kingdom owned by the Department for Business, Innovation and Skills (BIS). CfEL was responsible for managing BIS's financial schemes, such as venture capital funds and loan guarantees, aimed at helping small and medium enterprises (SMEs).

It invested over £1.8 billion from its formation and alongside private capital provided £6.5 billion in credit for SMEs. It ceased operating independently on 1 October 2013 and became part of the British Business Bank.

== History ==
=== Foundation ===
CfEL commenced actively trading on 1 April 2008 when it took over responsibility for the management of BIS's Enterprise Capital Funds, along with other equity funds and the Small Firms Loan Guarantee.

=== Restructure and closure ===
In September 2012 the Secretary of State for Business, Innovation and Skills, Vince Cable, announced that the government would be creating a business bank to aid the growth of SMEs. The intention was for the bank to work with the private sector to increase the supply of credit, as well as provide advice to SMEs. On 1 October 2013 CfEL was brought into BIS, together with BIS SME policy teams and private sector expertise, to create the British Business Bank.

== Financial schemes ==
CfEL managed a number of schemes on behalf of BIS, both current open schemes and legacy schemes that had stopped making new investments.

=== Existing schemes ===
- Enterprise Capital Funds. ECFs provide investments of up to £2 million to fast growing businesses. Public money is invested alongside private capital into a number of different funds. There are currently 12 ECFs.
- UK Innovation Investment Fund. A venture capital fund of funds that invests in technology based businesses where there are significant growth opportunities.
- Enterprise Finance Guarantee. Offers loan guarantees from the UK Government to lenders offering credit to SMEs.
- Aspire Fund. A fund supporting women-led businesses in the UK.
- JEREMIE Funds. Regional based investments funded from the European Regional Development Fund and the European Investment Bank.
- Business Finance Partnership. Supplies capital through non-bank lending channels.

=== Legacy schemes ===
- Small Firms Loan Guarantee
- Regional Venture Capital Fund
- UK High Technology Fund
- Early Growth Funds
- Capital for Enterprise Fund
- Portfolio of regional funds established by regional development agencies

== Management ==
CfEL was managed by an independent Board of Directors appointed by BIS.
