= Bank referral scheme =

The UK government-mandated bank referral scheme (Designated Platforms) was created by the Small Business, Enterprise and Employment Act 2015 to allow the UK government to track businesses and their requests for business finance. The scheme was launched in November 2016 after more than two years of deliberation.

Businesses who have been unsuccessful in a credit application process with a bank will be asked for their permission to have their financial information passed to designated finance platforms, who can contact the business in a regulated time-frame.

The three designated finance platforms selected are Funding Options, Funding Xchange and Alternative Business Funding.

The Sunday Times reported in March 2017 that since the launch, the scheme has seen low numbers of referrals. Of the businesses which have been declined by the high street banks, less than 24 percent have been referred to the Designated Platforms.

== How the Referral Scheme works ==
The bank referral scheme imposes a statutory duty on selected UK high street banks to pass on businesses who have been unsuccessful in applying for finance to the three designated alternative finance platforms, who will then email or phone the businesses to offer their service. If a business chooses to interact with any of the finance platforms they fill in a few questions and the finance platform runs the data against their panel of finance providers to see if there are any potential matches. If there are matches the business can then choose whether to make contact with a finance provider and then and only then is their data shared with that finance provider. Funding available through the bank referral scheme covers term lending, receivables finance, asset finance, commercial property finance and online lenders, as well as government-backed and not-for-profit lenders. None of the three finance platforms support equity finance.

For the referral scheme to perform as envisaged by the UK Government, the businesses affected must give formal permission to the bank to pass on their information to platforms. Business owners have expressed concern and confusion as to how the referral scheme will perform in practice.

== Concerns ==
Concerns have centred around the high-interest rates that are charged by alternative finance providers, how confidential information will be treated by the designated platforms who are small start-up businesses and the possibility of being contacted by a number of unknown companies who have had access to confidential business and financial information.

== Background ==
The idea of the bank referral scheme was advocated by the Liberal Democrats under Nick Clegg with the former Liberal Democrat Business Secretary, Sir Vince Cable hinting at it in March 2014. The then Chancellor of the Exchequer, George Osborne announced in August 2014 the scheme; after a five-month industry consultation selected British Business Bank (the UK's state development bank) to run the assessment process to recommend three designated finance platforms on behalf of HM Treasury.

The scheme which was included in the Small Business, Enterprise and Employment Act 2015 was given Royal Assent in March 2015. The implementation of the scheme was slowed down by a multitude of logistical problems such as how and when a bank should refer a business to the alternative finance sector.

A year after the announcement of the scheme, there was no progress and the scheme seemed to have been forgotten.

The bank referral scheme was launched on 1 November 2016 after a further two-month delay.
