= Lee Hudson Teslik =

Lee Hudson Teslik is the founder and CEO of Reverence Care, a business providing scheduling services for home-based healthcare organizations. He was formerly a corporate strategy executive at Google, and has previously worked as a speechwriter for Queen Rania of Jordan, at the Council on Foreign Relations and as a consultant at McKinsey & Company. His writings have been published in The New York Times, Washington Post, Slate, Newsweek, and Time, and he has written for The Economist as a guest writer. He has reported from several countries including Iraq, Kosovo, and China. He holds a bachelor's degree from Harvard University and an MBA from INSEAD.

== Awards and honors ==
"Crisis Guide: Global Economy"—an interactive online examination of the financial crisis which Teslik wrote for the Council on Foreign Relations—won a 2009 Emmy Award in the category "New Approaches to Business and Financial Reporting."
