= WEF (disambiguation) =

WEF stands for the World Economic Forum, a Geneva-based foundation that holds meetings of world economic leaders.

WEF may also refer to:

- WEF, IATA code for Weifang Airport, Shandong, China
- Water Environment Federation, a worldwide organization of engineers and industry related to water use
- World Education Forum, association of bodies involved in education
