= Pakistan Recovery Fund =

Defunct disaster relief fund

The Pakistan Recovery Fund was a disaster relief fund established by King Charles III, to aid Pakistan after the 2010 monsoon season.

The recovery process was scheduled to run for two years, a period which was deemed sufficiently long to curb the hardship resulting from the disaster.

== History ==
The 2010 Pakistan floods was combined to create a moving body of water. Creating one of the worst floods in Pakistan's history. The devastation caused by the floods impacted upon the lives of over 20 million people.

King Charles III, concerned with the situation of the people in Pakistan, initiated a recovery fund, which aimed to raise significant investment in funding and support in-kind and goods over the next two years. The fund was one of a number of charitable initiatives under the auspices of the Prince's Charities group: The Prince's Charities

Beyond the ongoing life and health threatening effects, the floods have had a significant negative impact on Pakistan's development prospects over the coming years. Essential infrastructure including roads, bridges, housing, schools, medical facilities, farm structures and markets were severely damaged; causing an estimated damage of up to $43 billion.

The following supported this initiative as members of the international leadership team: Etihad Airlines Etihad:Deutsche Bank Deutsche Bank: The Hashoo Foundation: James Caan, Mr Naguib Kheraj. The International Steering Group was chaired by Mr John O'Brien MBE, The Prince of Wales's appointed campaigner and then senior partner at Knighton White knighton white.

General campaign participation

A key part of the campaign was the development of voluntary groups around key locations in the world, allowing supporters to fundraise around the initiative. Corporate support, donations, employee participation all will be encouraged. Various discreet sponsorship opportunities also exist in Washington, D.C., Los Angeles, London, Dubai/Abu Dhabi and in Pakistan itself.
