= Queen Rania of Jordan =

Queen of Jordan since 1999

Rania
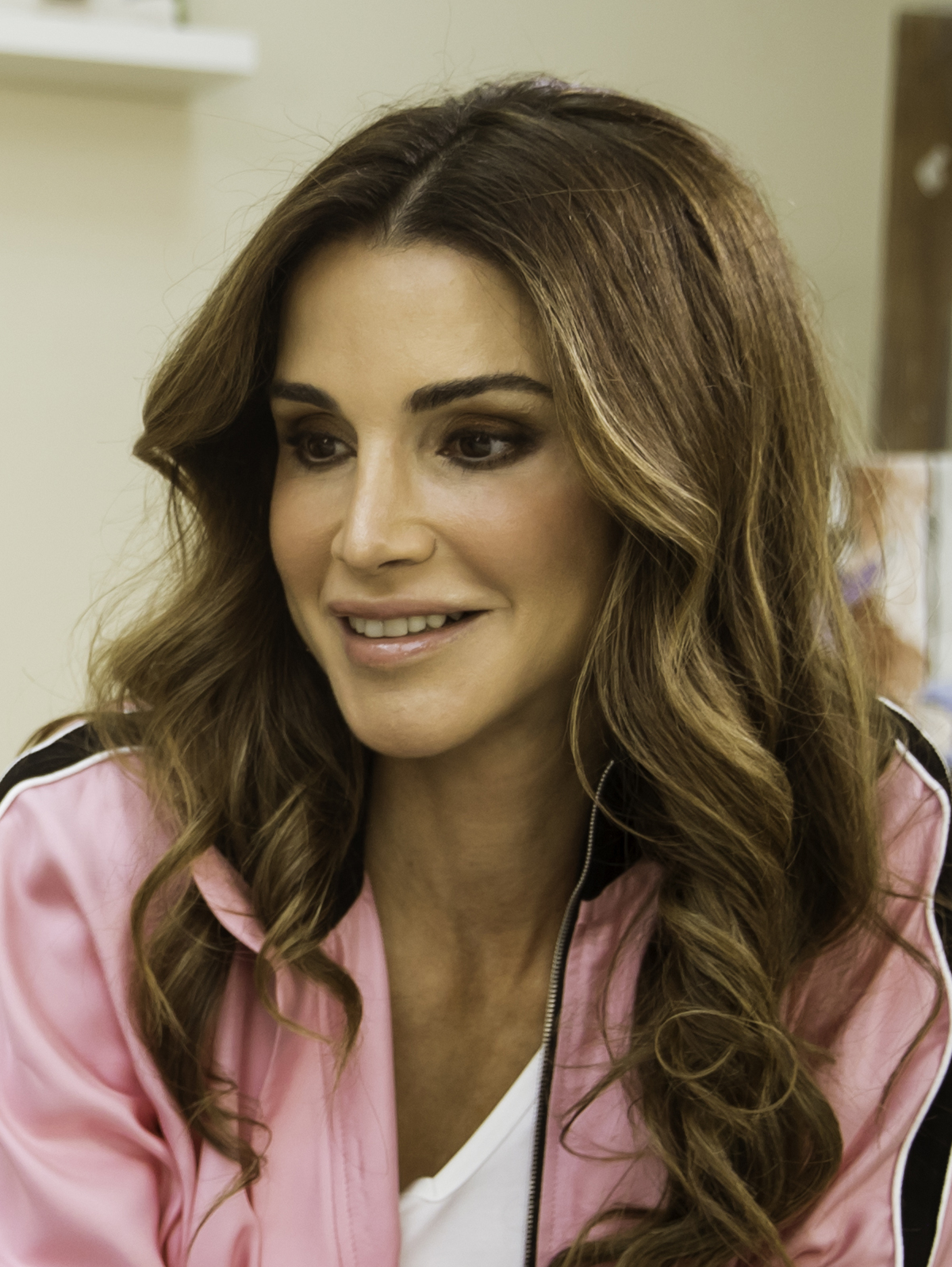
- Rania in 2018

Queen consort of Jordan
- Tenure: 7 February 1999 – present
- Proclamation: 22 March 1999
- Born: Rania Al-Yassin; 31 August 1970 (age 56); Kuwait City, Kuwait
- Spouse: Abdullah II (m. 1993)
- Issue: Crown Prince Hussein; Princess Iman; Princess Salma; Prince Hashem
Regnal name
- Rania Al Abdullah
- Father: Faisal Al-Yassin
- Mother: Ilham Yassin
- Religion: Islam
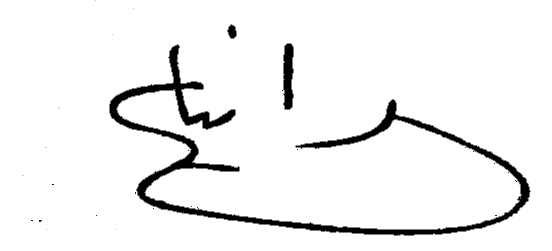
- Signature

Rania Al Abdullah (Note: Arabic: رانيا العبد الله, romanized: Rāniyā al-ʻAbd Allāh) (born Rania Al-Yassin, 31 August 1970) is Queen of Jordan as the wife of King Abdullah II.

Rania's domestic activities include education, youth, environmental, and health initiatives. Globally, she has campaigned for education and cross-cultural dialogue. She has authored three children's books: The Sandwich Swap, The King's Gift, and Eternal Beauty.

== Early life ==
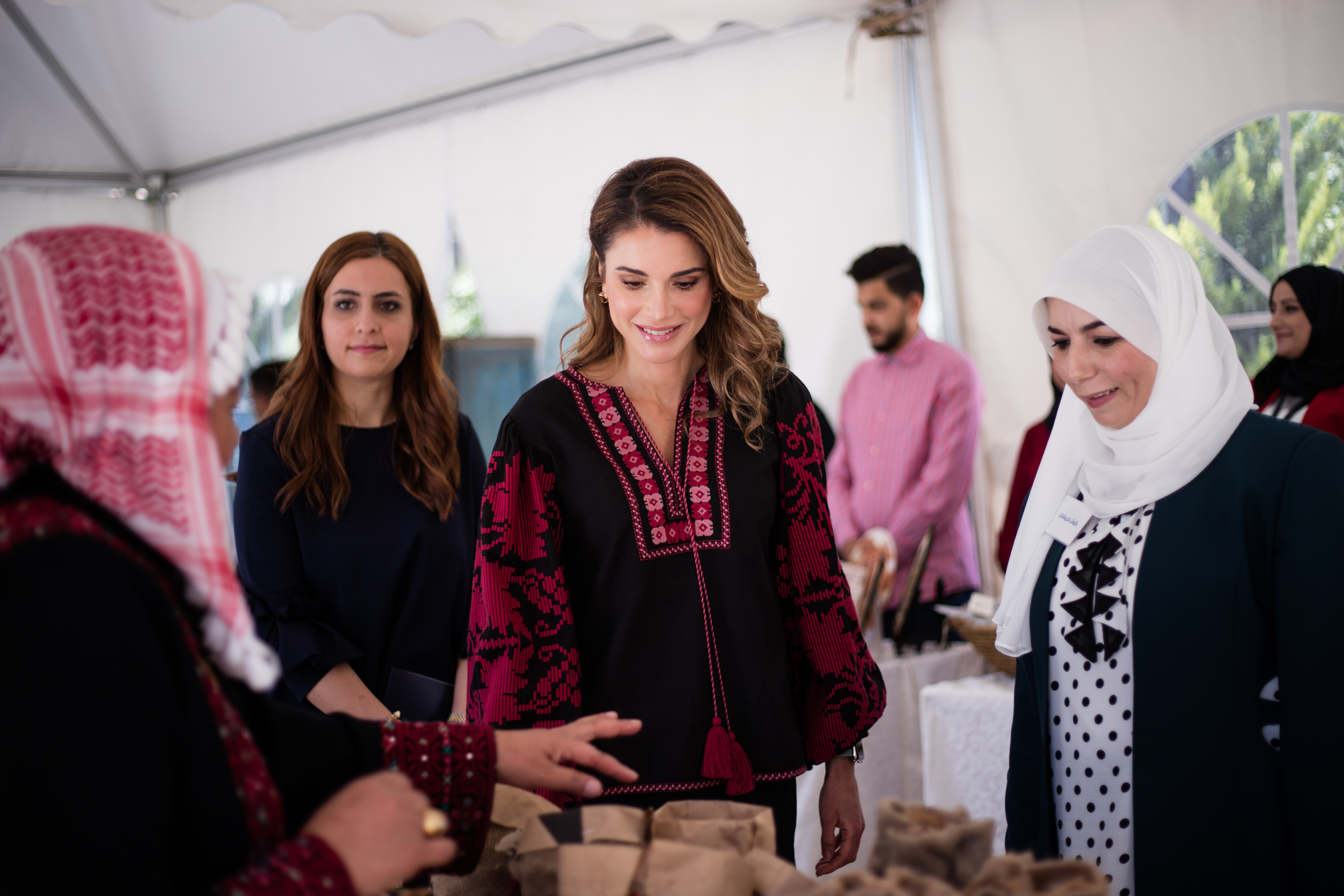
Rania in a traditional Palestinian dress, 2017

Rania Al-Yassin was born on 31 August 1970 in Kuwait to Jordanian parents of Palestinian origin. Her father, Faisal Sidqi Al-Yassin, was from Tulkarm, the northern West Bank while her mother, Ilham Ali Ibrahim Rasekh, was from Nablus. Rania has stated that her maternal grandfather was Turkish. Her parents originally resided in Tulkarm until the 1967 Six-Day War, when the family relocated to Kuwait. Rania spent her childhood and part of her youth in Kuwait, where her father worked at a children's hospital before establishing a private medical clinic. He continued practicing there until the family relocated to Jordan following the Iraqi invasion of Kuwait in 1990. Rania graduated from New English School in Kuwait in 1991 and subsequently earned a degree in business administration from the American University in Cairo. Following her graduation, she worked briefly in marketing for Citibank, followed by a job with Apple Inc. in Amman, Jordan.

== Activities ==
Since her marriage, Rania has used her position to advocate for various sectors of society in Jordan and beyond.

=== Domestic agenda ===
==== Education ====
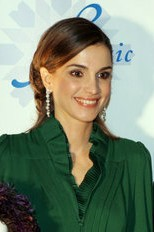
Rania during a dinner celebrating the partnership between the Sesame Workshop and the Mosaic Foundation in Washington, D.C., US, May 2006

Queen Rania has launched and championed several initiatives in education and learning. She has stated that an essential aspect of education is to equip young people with the necessary skills to perform well in the workplace. She has said that education is a tool for individuals to empower themselves, allows the poor to improve their lives, and is an investment Jordan makes to protect its people from being exploited and falling victim to extremist ideology.

In July 2005 in partnership with the Ministry of Education, the King and Queen launched an annual teachers' award, the Queen Rania Award for Excellence in Education.

The Queen is chairperson of Jordan's first interactive children's museum, which opened in May 2007. In April 2008, the Queen launched "Madrasati" ("My School"), a public-private initiative aimed at refurbishing 500 of Jordan's public schools over a five-year period. Rania also established The Queen Rania Al Abdullah Center for Educational Technology on 6 June 2001, aiming to use modern technology to serve and develop education in Jordan.

The Queen Rania Teacher Academy, which was launched in June 2009, provides professional development programs for current and new teachers in partnership with the Ministry of Education. The Queen Rania Scholarship Program partners with several universities from around the world to support scholarships and training for Jordanian students and workers in management, marketing, design, business administration, psychology, engineering, law, and other fields.

==== Community and youth empowerment ====
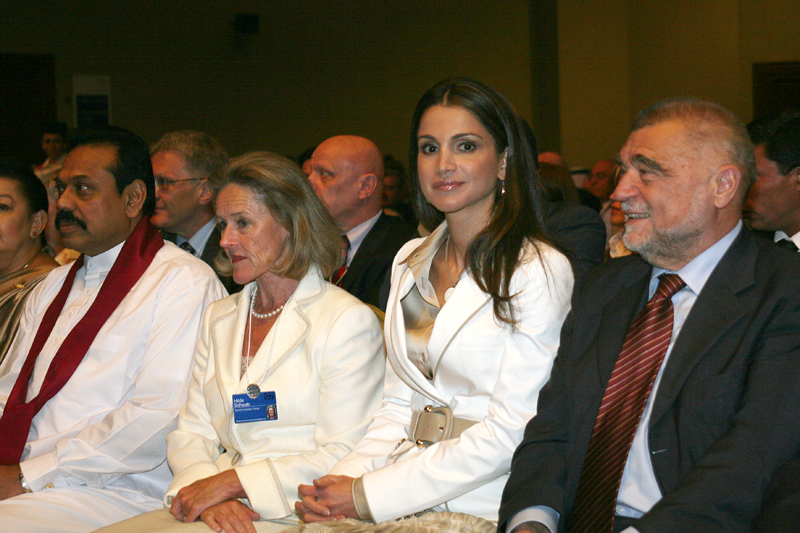
Rania at the World Economic Forum on the Middle East held at the Dead Sea, Jordan, in 2007

Queen Rania's first venture was the establishment of the Jordan River Foundation (JRF) in 1995.

The Jordan River Children Program (JRCP) was developed by Rania to place children's welfare above political agendas and cultural taboos. This led to the launch, in 1998, of JRF's Child Safety Program, which addresses the immediate needs of children at risk from abuse and initiated a long-term campaign to increase public awareness about violence against children. The deaths of two children in Amman as a result of child abuse in early 2009 led Rania to call for an emergency meeting of government and non-government (including JRF) stakeholders to discuss where the system was failing.

In 2009, to celebrate the 10th anniversary of her husband's accession to the throne, Rania launched a community champion award (Ahel Al Himmeh) to highlight the accomplishments of groups and individuals who have helped their local communities. Rania initiated the Al-Aman Fund for the Future of Orphans in 2003.

In her capacity as regional ambassador of INJAZ Al-Arab, Rania has taught classes and engaged in dialogue with young people in other countries; she also launched INJAZ Al-Arab's presence elsewhere in the Arab world. She chaired a discussion with entrepreneurs in celebration of INJAZ Al-Arab's 10th anniversary, showcasing alumni's success stories At the 2008 World Economic Forum in Davos, she launched the "Empowering One Million Arab Youth by 2018" campaign, which was conceived by INJAZ Arabia.

==== Health ====
In 2005, Rania established the Royal Health Awareness Society (RHAS) to educate parents and children about the basics of nutrition and hygiene, the benefits of exercise, the harms of smoking, and other areas related to health.

In 2011, the first specialized medical building for children was built in Jordan, Queen Rania Children's Hospital, established to improve the medical service for Jordanian children. The hospital provides for the care of children, especially complex medical cases including organ transplants and endoscopic operations.

=== Global agenda ===
==== Global education ====
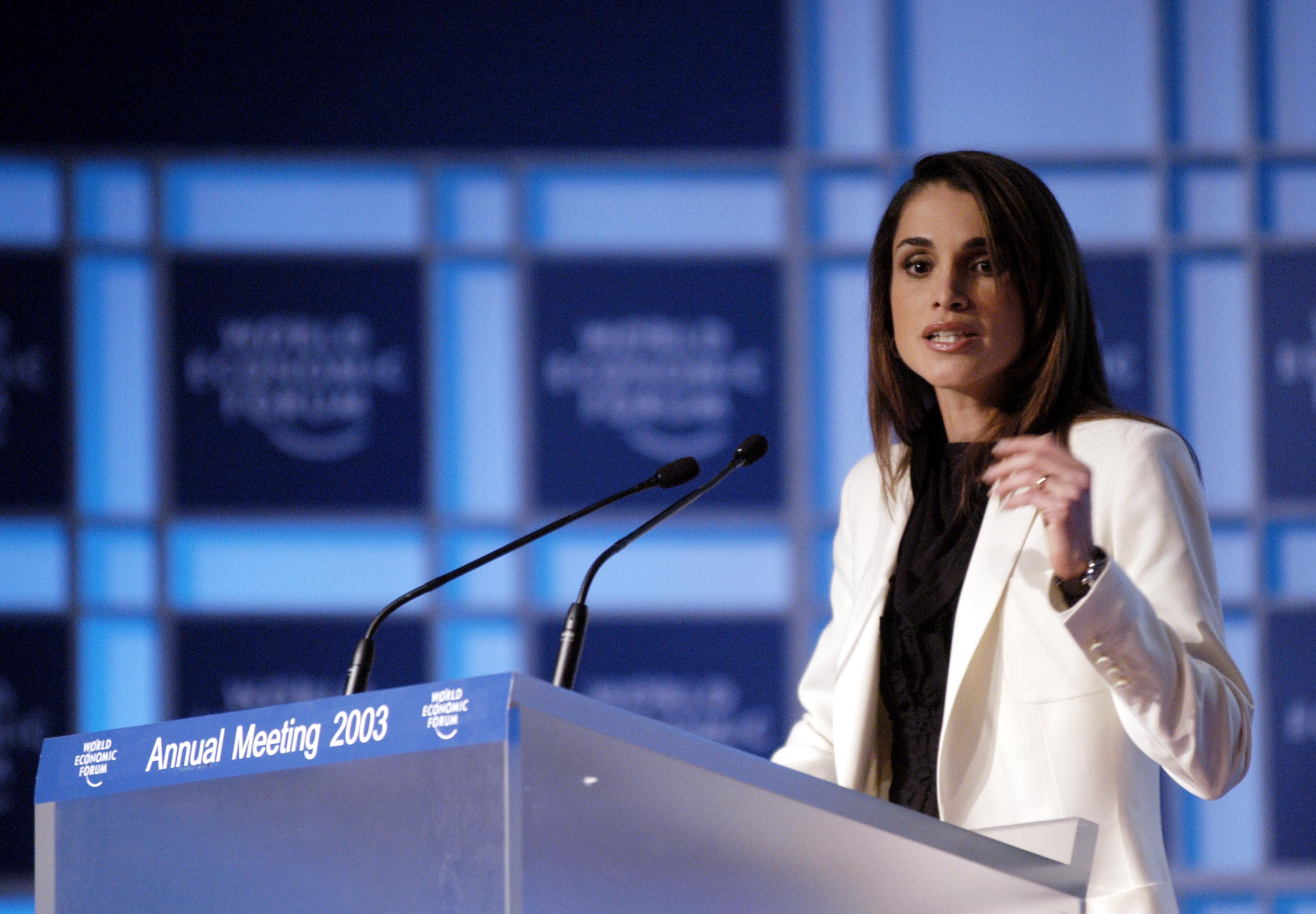
Speaking at the 2003 World Economic Forum in Davos, Switzerland

In November 2000, in recognition of her commitment to the cause of children and youth, the United Nations Children's Fund (UNICEF) invited Rania to join its Global Leadership Initiative. In early 2002 Rania joined the board of directors of the International Youth Foundation, based in Baltimore, Maryland, in the United States. In January 2007, Rania was named UNICEF's first Eminent Advocate for Children. In August 2009, Rania became Honorary Global Chair of the United Nations Girls' Education Initiative (UNGEI).

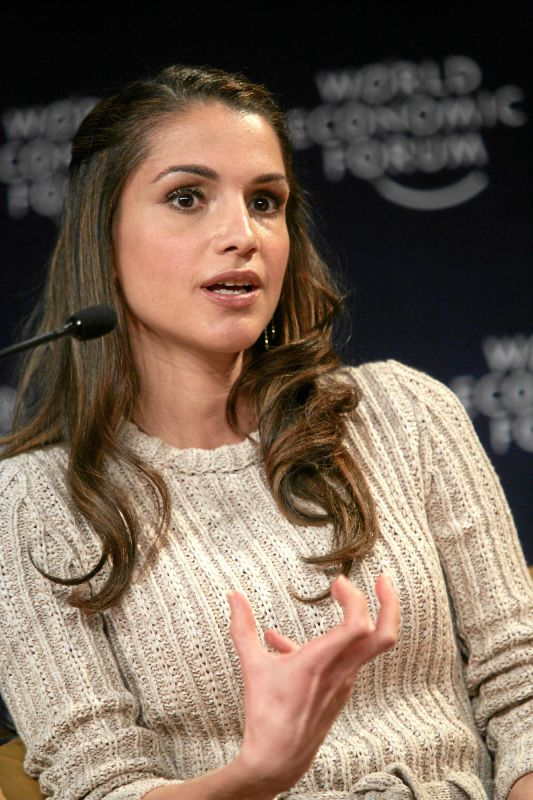
Rania at Davos, 2009

As a longtime supporter of the Global Campaign for Education (GCE), Rania met with children and inspirational women in South Africa, both in the cities of Johannesburg and Soweto, in March 2009. One of the stories in the book, "Maha of the Mountains", was contributed by Rania.

During her April 2009 US trip, Rania joined leading education advocates Congresswoman Nita Lowey and Counsellor to the Secretary of the Treasury Gene Sperling to launch "The Big Read" as part of Global Campaign for Education's global action week calling for quality basic education for all children. She was also hosted by first lady of the United States, Michelle Obama, during that same trip.

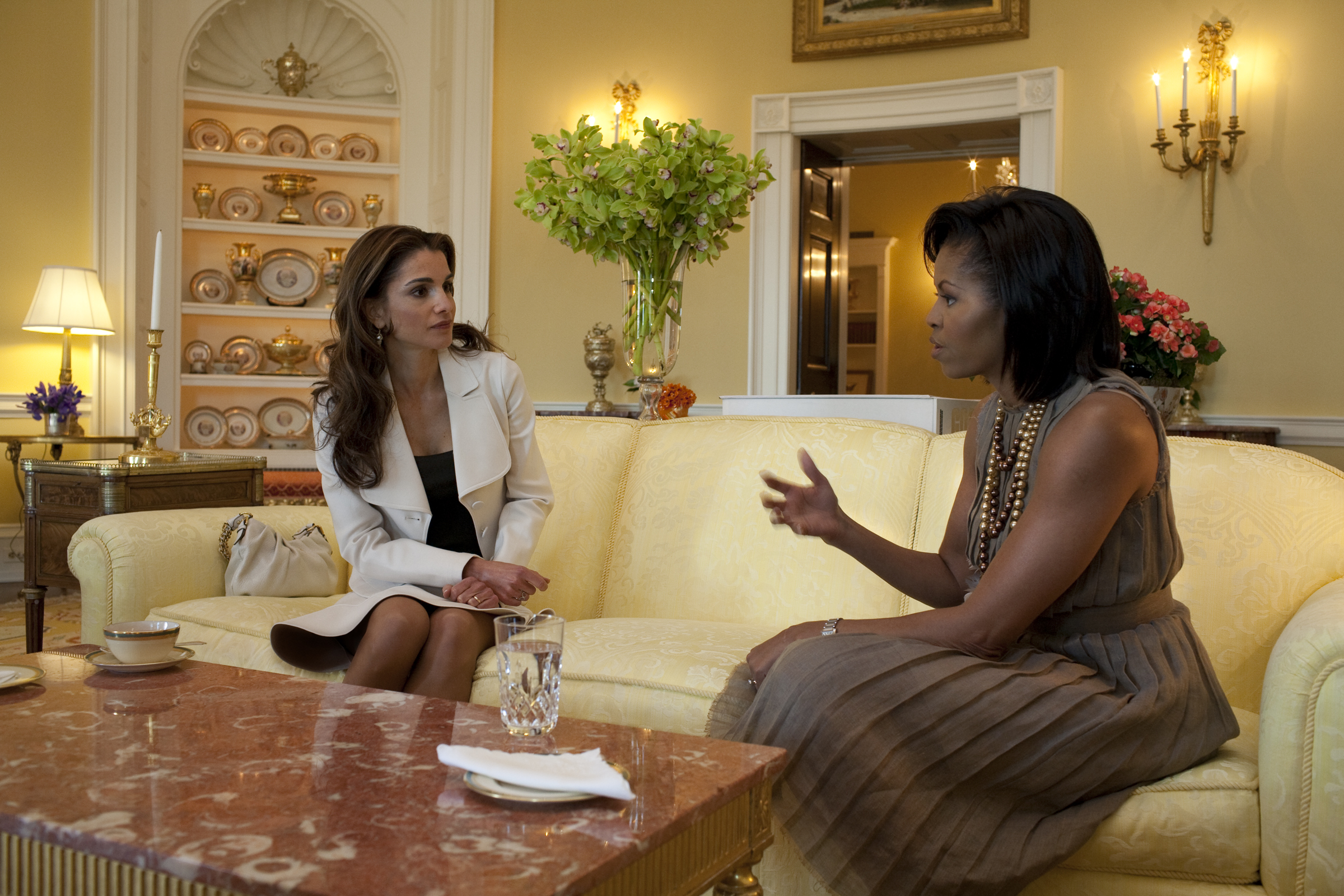
US First Lady Michelle Obama hosts Queen Rania in the Yellow Oval Room, April 2009.

On 20 August 2009, Rania co-founded and led the launch of the "1GOAL: Education for All" campaign alongside Gary Lineker, and with the help of top international footballers at Wembley Stadium, London. On 6 October 2009, Rania was joined by Prime Minister Gordon Brown of the UK, the president of FIFA, Sepp Blatter, President Jacob Zuma of South Africa, and other heads of state, for the Global Launch of 1GOAL, which took place across six locations worldwide.

==== Cross-cultural dialogue ====
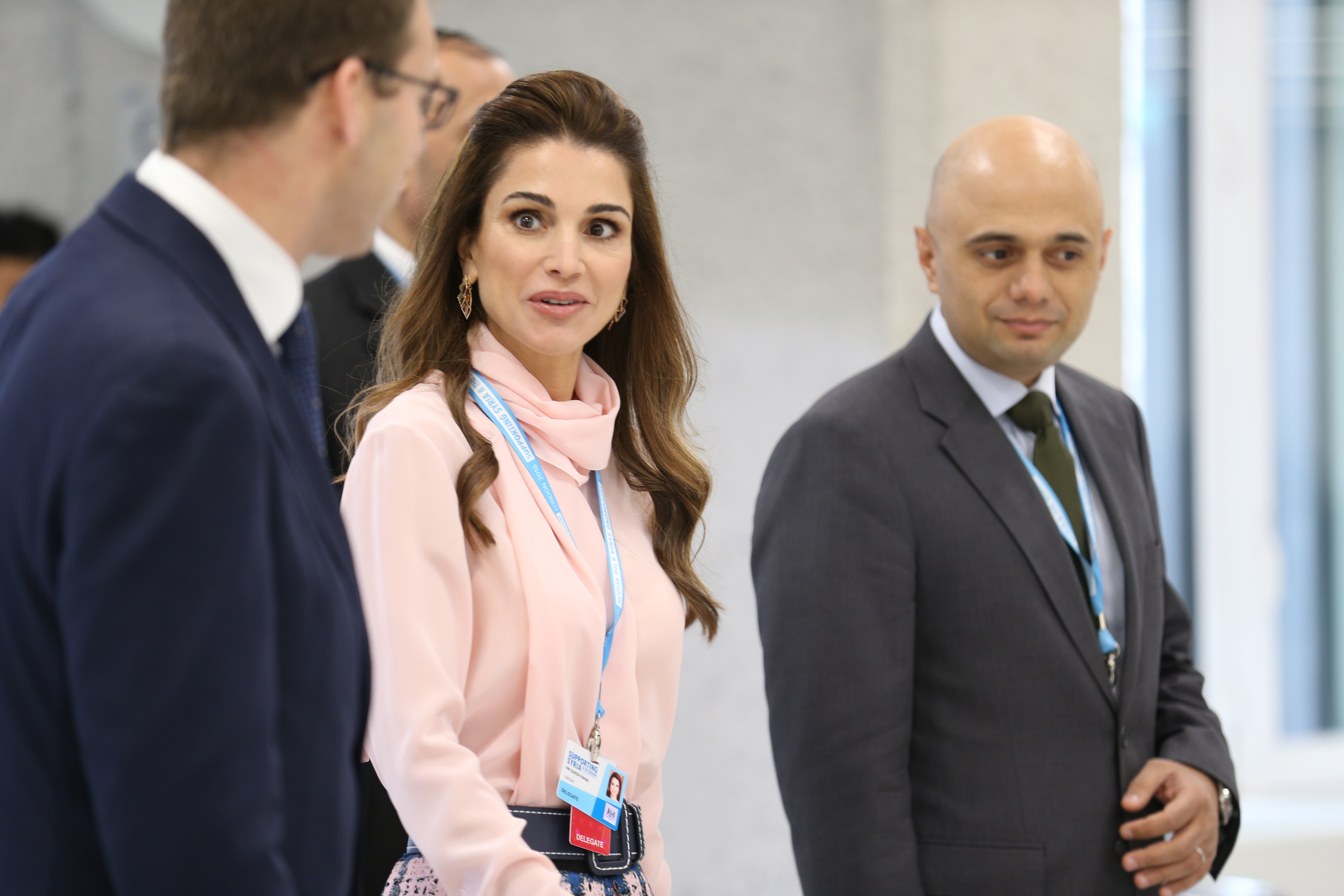
With Sajid Javid at the Supporting Syria and the Region conference, 2016

Rania has also been particularly vocal about the importance of cross-cultural and interfaith dialogue to foster greater understanding, tolerance and acceptance across the world. She has used her status to correct what she sees as misconceptions in the West about the Arab world.

Rania has played a significant role in reaching out to the global community to foster values of tolerance and acceptance, and increase cross-cultural dialogue. For example, regionally and internationally, Rania has campaigned for a greater understanding between cultures in such high-profile forums as the Jeddah Economic Forum, Harvard Kennedy School at Harvard University, and the Skoll Foundation in the UK. She has also made public appearances, including a half-hour television interview on The Oprah Winfrey Show on 17 May 2006, where she spoke about misconceptions about Islam and especially women in Islam.

In September 2006, Rania also joined the United Nations Foundation board of directors. The UN Foundation builds and implements public-private partnerships to address the world's most pressing problems, and broadens support for the UN through advocacy and public outreach.

==== Microfinance ====
In September 2003, Rania accepted an invitation to join the board of directors of the Foundation for International Community Assistance (FINCA).

An emissary for the United Nations' International Year of Microcredit in 2005, Rania's belief in microfinance and her partnership with FINCA has generated more Jordanian micro-businesses, with the official opening of FINCA Jordan in February 2008.

==== Environment ====
In October 2020, Rania was named as a member of the Earthshot Prize Council, an initiative of Prince William to find solutions to environmental issues.

=== Social media ===
==== YouTube ====
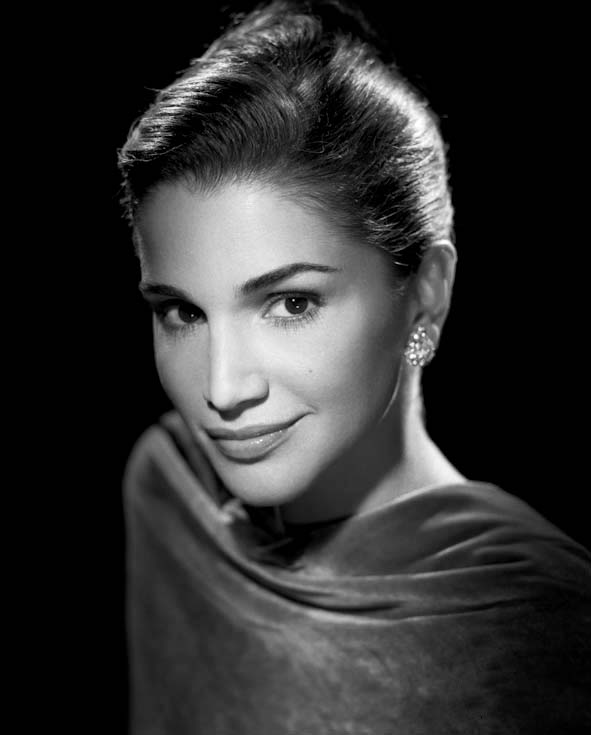
Rania has a large audience across multiple social media platforms.

Rania has used YouTube, stated as a way to promote intercultural dialogue by calling on young people around the world to engage in a global dialogue to dismantle stereotypes of Muslims and the Arab world. On 30 March 2008, Rania launched her own YouTube channel, initially to invite viewers to give their opinions of the Middle East and talk about stereotypes they may have of Arabs and Muslims. Between 30 March and 12 August (International Youth Day), Rania posted videos on YouTube in which she asked people to send her their questions about Islam and the Arab world. She provided responses to those questions and explained her view of the truth about various Arab and Muslim stereotypes. Over five months she posted videos on subjects that included honour killings, terrorism and the rights of Arab women. International personalities such as Dean Obeidallah, Maz Jobrani, and YouTube star Mia Rose also contributed videos to the campaign.

In 2008, Rania participated in YouTube's In My Name campaign. She appeared alongside The Black Eyed Peas member will.i.am in the video, "End Poverty – Be the Generation," which urged world leaders to keep the promises they made in 2000 at the United Nations Millennium Summit.

==== Twitter ====
To coincide with the visit of Pope Benedict XVI to Jordan on 8 May 2009, Rania joined Twitter with the username @QueenRania. She conducted her first Twitter interview, answering questions from the public via her Twitter account at the World Economic Forum at the Dead Sea in Jordan in June 2009.

== Personal life ==
Rania met Jordanian Prince Abdullah bin Al-Hussein at a dinner party in January 1993. On 10 June 1993, they were married at Zahran Palace. Their wedding ceremony was considered a national holiday. The couple have four children:

- Crown Prince Hussein (born 28 June 1994) who married Rajwa Al-Saif on 1 June 2023 at Zahran Palace in Amman; they have one daughter:
  - Princess Iman bint Al Hussein (born 3 August 2024)
- Princess Iman (born 27 September 1996) who married Jameel Alexander Thermiótis on 12 March 2023 at Beit Al Urdun Palace in Amman; they have three daughters:
  - Amina Thermiótis (born 16 February 2025)
  - Talia Thermiótis (born 14 August 2026)
  - Rania Thermiótis (born 14 August 2026)
- Princess Salma (born 26 September 2000)
- Prince Hashem (born 30 January 2005)

Abdullah ascended the throne on 7 February 1999, and proclaimed Rania queen on 22 March 1999.

Queen Rania is Muslim. Describing Islam, Rania stated that "Islam is a religion of peace, tolerance and mercy. It is a source of comfort and strength for more than 1.6 billion Muslims."

== Publications ==
- As a tribute to King Hussein, and on the first anniversary of his death, Rania produced The King's Gift, a children's book about him. Proceeds of the book go to the benefit of underprivileged children across Jordan.
- Her second book, entitled Eternal Beauty, which she wrote in celebration of Mother's Day 2008 tells the story of a young girl's conversation with a little sheep as she searches for the most beautiful thing in the world. The book was released as part of the Greater Amman Municipality's contest, called "Mama's Story".
- For the 2009 Big Read event, Rania wrote Maha of the Mountains, a short story which tells of a young girl's determination to get an education and the challenges she faced.
- The Sandwich Swap is a book inspired by an incident in her childhood. It tells the story of Lily and Salma, two best friends, who argue over the "yucky" taste of their respective peanut butter and jelly and hummus sandwiches. The girls then overcome and embrace their differences. The book was co-authored by Queen Rania and Kelly DiPucchio. In May 2010, the book went to the top of the New York Times Best Seller list for children's books.

== Affiliations ==
Queen Rania campaigned for Petra to be voted as one of the New 7 Wonders of the World, including welcoming New7Wonders to Petra during its world tour.

== International roles and positions ==
- In November 2000, the United Nations Children's Fund (UNICEF) invited Rania to join its Global Leadership Initiative.
- At the World Economic Forum in Davos in January 2007, Rania was named UNICEF's first Eminent Advocate for Children.
- In August 2009, Rania was named co-founder and global co-chair of 1GOAL.
- In July 2009, the United Nations made Rania Honorary Chairperson for the United Nations Girls' Education Initiative (UNGEI).
- For their Global Action Week in April 2009, the Global Campaign for Education named Rania their honorary chairperson.
- In early 2002, Rania joined the board of directors of the International Youth Foundation, based in Baltimore, Maryland, in the United States.
- In September 2002, Rania became a member of the World Economic Forum (WEF) Foundation Board. She is also on the Foundation Board of the Forum of Young Global Leaders (YGL) and has been the chairperson for the Nominations and Selection Committee since July 2004, when the forum was established.
- In September 2006, Rania joined the United Nations Foundation board of directors.
- Rania was a member of the Every Child Council for the GAVI Alliance.
- Rania was an Honorary Member of the International Advisory Council for the International Center for Research on Women (ICRW).
- Rania is co-chair of the Arab Open University.
- She was Honorary Chairperson of the Jordanian Chapter of Operation Smile.
- As of 2024, she is a member of the board of trustees of the World Economic Forum.

== Honours ==
=== National ===
- Jordan:
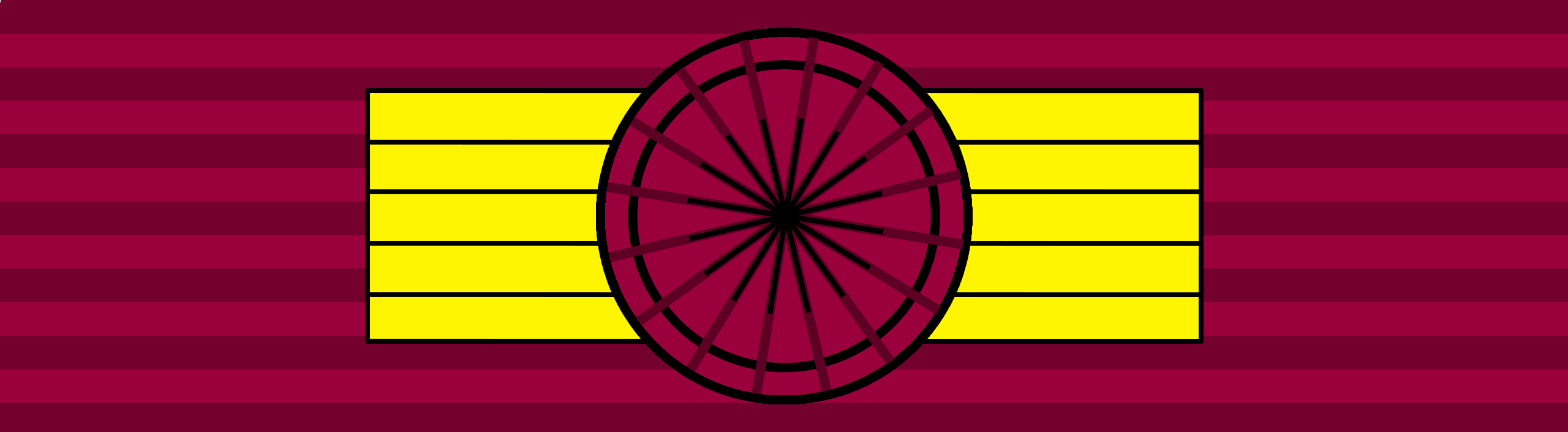
  - Knight Grand Cordon with Collar of the Order of Al-Hussein bin Ali. (9 June 1999)
  - Knight Grand Cordon, Special Class of the Supreme Order of the Renaissance (6 March 2024).

=== Foreign ===
- Belgium: Dame Grand Cross of the Order of Leopold I (18 May 2016).
- Brunei: DK of The Most Esteemed Royal Family Order of Laila Utama (13 May 2008).
- Germany: Grand Cross, Special Class of the Order of Merit of the Federal Republic of Germany (21 October 2002).
- Italy: Grand Cross of the Order of Merit of the Italian Republic (19 October 2009).
- Japan: Dame Grand Cordon of the Order of the Precious Crown (4 December 1999).
- Montenegro: 1st Class of the Order of the Montenegrin Grand Star (2013).
- Netherlands: Dame Grand Cross of the Order of the Lion of the Netherlands (30 October 2006).
- Norway: Dame Grand Cross of the Order of Saint Olav (2 March 2000).
- Portugal:
  - Grand Cross of the Order of Saint James of the Sword (16 March 2009).
  - Grand Cross of the Order of Infante Henry (5 March 2008).
- Spain:
  - Dame Grand Cross of the Order of Charles III (21 April 2006).
  - Dame Grand Cross of the Royal Order of Isabella the Catholic (18 October 1999).
- Sweden: Member Grand Cross of the Order of the Seraphim (7 October 2003)

=== Awards and recognition ===
- 2001: Life Achievement Award of International Osteoporosis Foundation, Italy
- 2002: Ambrogino D'Oro Award from the Municipality of Milan, Italy
- 2002: Gold Medal of the President of the Italian Republic from Pio Manzù International Research Centre, Italy
- 2003: German Media Award from Deutscher Medienpreis, Germany
- 2005: Golden Plate Award, Academy of Achievement, USA
- 2005: Sesame Workshop Award from Sesame Workshop, USA
- 2007: Mediterranean Prize for Social Solidarity from the Mediterranean Foundation in Italy
- 2007: Global Humanitarian Action Award from UNSA-USA and the Business Council of the UN, USA
- 2007: Bambi Award for Attention Based Charity by Hubert Burda Media, Germany
- 2007: John Wallach Humanitarian Award and PeaceMaker Award from the non-profit Seeds of Peace, USA
- 2008: World Savers Award from Conde Nast Traveler, USA
- 2008: David Rockefeller Bridging Leadership Award from Synergos University, USA
- 2008: First ever YouTube Visionary Award
- 2009: The Marisa Bellisario International Award from the Fondazione Bellisario, Italy
- 2009: North-South Prize by the North-South Prize, Portugal
- 2009: FIFA Presidential Award, Switzerland
- 2010: Arab Knight of Giving Award from Arab Giving Forum, UAE
- 2010: The Leadership Award from White Ribbon Alliance for Safe Motherhood, USA
- 2010: James C. Morgan Global Humanitarian Award from Tech Awards, USA
- 2010: Glamour's 2010 Woman of the Year, USA
- 2011: Forbes magazine ranked Rania as one of the world's 100 most powerful women
- 2013: Atlantic Council's Global Citizen Awards, USA
- 2015: Walther Rathenau Award from Walther Rathenau Institut, Germany
- 2015: World Childhood Award from Queen Silvia's World Childhood Foundation, USA
- 2016: Andrea Bocelli Humanitarian Award, Italy
- 2016: Foreign Press Association's Humanitarian Award, UK
- 2016: The Golden Heart Award, Germany
- 2016: Medal of Honor for Women from Sheikh Mohammad Bin Rashid, presented by his Son Sheikh Hamdan at the Global Women Forum in Dubai
- 2017: Global Trailblazer Award, USA
- 2017: The Fellowship Award from Fashion for Relief in Recognition of Her Majesty's Humanitarian Efforts Towards Children Caught in Conflict, France
- 2018: The Influential Personality of the Year Award, at the third annual Arab Social Media Influencers Summit (ASMIS) in Dubai
- 2020: The PWI Most Beautiful Woman In The World Award 2020
- 2022: Zayed Award for Human Fraternity 2022
- 2022: Path to Peace Award 2022

=== Honorary doctorates ===
- 2001 Honorary Doctorate in Law (LLD) from the University of Exeter, UK
- 2008 Honorary Doctorate Degree in Educational Sciences from the University of Jordan
- 2008 Honorary Doctorate in International Relations from the University of Malaya, Malaysia
- 2015 Honorary Doctorate in "Science Development and International Cooperation" from the University of Sapienza, Italy

== Notes ==
Royal titles
Preceded by Noor Al-Hussein	Queen consort of Jordan; 1999–present	Incumbent
