= Episode 1 (company) =

Episode 1 is a venture fund set up to invest in early-stage technology companies based in the UK.

== History ==
The three partners behind the fund – Simon Murdoch, Damien Lane and Adrian Lloyd – are experienced entrepreneurs and investors, and have been through every stage of the start-up process, from inception to initial public offering. The firm invests between £250,000 and £2 million in UK based early-stage companies. Episode 1's first fund was launched in 2013 and totalled £37.5m. Its objective is to give a better start to the next generation of British tech ventures than their predecessors. It was created with a mixture of public and private money, including backing from Alex Chesterman of Zoopla Property Group. It is one of the UK Government's Enterprise Capital Funds – set up to support fund managers who invest in small, high-growth businesses. The £12.5 million of private investment was matched with £25 million of public money. The government's Business Secretary Vince Cable endorsed the launch of the fund, saying it 'will target a serious gap in the equity market for high-growth small firms'.

The firm launched a second Enterprise Capital Fund totalling £60m in November 2017. The focus of the second fund is also early stage UK based businesses.

The team at Episode 1 made early investments in a number of technology businesses including Betfair (which is now listed on the London Stock Exchange and has a market cap of over £1.3 billion), LoveFilm (which was sold to Amazon.com in 2011), Natural Motion (which was sold to Zynga in 2014), ScanSafe (which was sold to Cisco Systems in 2009), Shazam and Zoopla (which is also listed on the London Stock Exchange).

Two of the three partners – Simon Murdoch and Damien Lane – previously worked at Octopus Investments.

== Investments ==
Investments made by Episode 1 include the following software-driven businesses:

- eMoov – an online estate agent
- Carwow – a car buying platform
- Zipcube – an online marketplace for booking corporate space
- User Replay – a customer experience management (CEM) software provider
