= Zipcube =

Online marketplace

- Website type: Online marketplace
- Available in: 3 languages
- List of languages Deutsch, Français, English
- Headquarters: London, {{{location_country}}}
- Area served: United Kingdom, France, Germany, United States, Republic of Ireland
- Owner: Zipcube Ltd.
- Founders: Guillaume Santacruz, David Hellard, William Dugdale
- Website: www.zipcube.com
- Launched: December 2013; 12 years ago

Zipcube is a British-based online marketplace for the short-term leasing of professional space such as office space and event space. The company acts as a broker and receives commissions from participating venues on a pay-per-booking basis. Zipcube operates in cities throughout Europe and the United States.

== History ==
Zipcube was founded in December 2013 by Guillaume Santacruz at Google's Campus London.

Santacruz noticed the complexity involved in setting up meetings. This prompted him to develop a service that allowed users to directly book venues and cut down inquiry times. David Hellard came on as Head of Sales and Marketing early on. His associate, William Dugdale, followed soon after that. Dugdale brought technical expertise to the team from his experience working in software architecture at HSBC and Imperial College London. Hellard and Dugdale had studied there together, both writing for Felix, Imperial's Student Newspaper, and as sabbaticals in the Student's Union.

In 2014, Zipcube finished first in the Think Digital Start-Up Competition. In 2016, Zipcube received seed investment funding from Episode 1. Zipcube has also expanded into the French, German, and US markets.

== Operations ==
Prospective customers can filter listed venues through various search criteria. Zipcube generates revenue by charging bookers the venue price and collecting a commission from the venue operators.
