= United Nations Girls' Education Initiative =

International educational organization

- Abbreviation: UNGEI
- Formation: 2000
- Founder: United Nations
- Type: International educational organizations
- Director: Antara Ganguli
- Website: www.ungei.org

The United Nations Girls' Education Initiative (UNGEI) is an initiative launched by the United Nations in 2000 at the World Education Forum in Dakar at the primary school Ndiarème B. It aims to reduce the gap in schooling for girls and to give girls equal access to all levels of education.

== Principles ==
Adopted at the June 13, 2008, meeting of the UNGEI Global Advisory Committee in Kathmandu, Nepal, the UNGEI vision statement is "A world where all girls and boys are empowered through quality education to realize their full potential and contribute to transforming societies where gender equality becomes a reality."

UNGEI, the EFA (Education for All) flagship for girls' education, is a partnership that embraces the United Nations system, governments, donor countries, non-governmental organizations, civil society, the private sector, and communities and families. UNGEI provides stakeholders with a platform for action and galvanizes their efforts to get girls in school.

Some of the fundamental principles of the initiative include expanding the quality of education across the globe for all, improving the equality of access to education, and focusing on gender-responsive education. Within a country's education system, the education of girls must be mainstreamed, according to the initiative.

== Process ==
The UNGEI creators decided to take a 4-step approach to analyze the current education systems in order to monitor and evaluate change over time. The first step being diagnosing the current extent of girls' education in different regions. Next, locating supply factors in girls' education such as policies, reform, funding, etc. Afterward, identifying demand factors in education such as poverty, attitudes, and cultural practices affecting education rates. Lastly, pinpointing stakeholders in girls' education at various levels. Together, these steps provided UNGEI with a foundation for proper analysis of the current education system before moving forward.

UNICEF is the lead agency and Secretariat for UNGEI. A Global Advisory Committee is composed of key partners who share in the planning, decision-making, guidance and accountability of UNGEI. UNGEI Focal Points in different regions facilitate the coordination of girls' education strategies and interventions at the country level. The purpose is not, however, limited to basic education; it focuses on a systematic approach.

At the country level, UNGEI supports country-led development and seeks to influence decision-making and investments to ensure gender equity and equality in national education policies, plans and programmes. It operates as a mechanism to advance education strategies and the technical capacity to assist countries. UNGEI partners mobilize resources for both targeted project interventions and country programmes as well as large scale systemic interventions designed to impact on the whole education system. UNGEI streamlines its efforts through the strategic use of existing mechanisms such as Poverty Reduction Strategies, sector-wide approaches and UN development assistance frameworks.

In May 2010, UNGEI organised the E4 conference on 'Engendering Empowerment: Education and Equality', held in Dakar, Senegal, and attended by a broad range of actors from national governments, UN agencies, and civil society.

The director is Antara Ganguli.

== Members ==
UNGEI members and partners are actively involved in the EFA Working Group coordinated by UNESCO, the EFA Fast Track Initiative led by the World Bank and the Acceleration Strategy for Girls' Education developed by UNICEF.

Partners include:

- UN agencies such as the ILO, UNESCO, UNFPA, UNICEF, and the WFP
- the World Bank
- donor agencies such as the Danish International Development Agency, the Norwegian Agency for Development Cooperation, the UK's Department for International Development, and USAID
- NGOs
- The Commonwealth Secretariat

== See also ==
- CAMFED
