= Ahel Al Himmeh =

Jordanian award

- Awarded for: Recognition of outstanding work and diligent efforts.
- Country: Jordan
- Presented by: Queen Rania of Jordan
- Website: www.himmeh.jo/

Ahel Al Himmeh is an award bestowed on Jordanian individuals or groups who have served their communities in outstanding ways. The award was launched by Jordanian Queen Rania Al Abdullah in 2009 in honor of King Abdullah II's 10th anniversary of his accession to the throne.
