= Hamilton Bradshaw =

British private equity firm

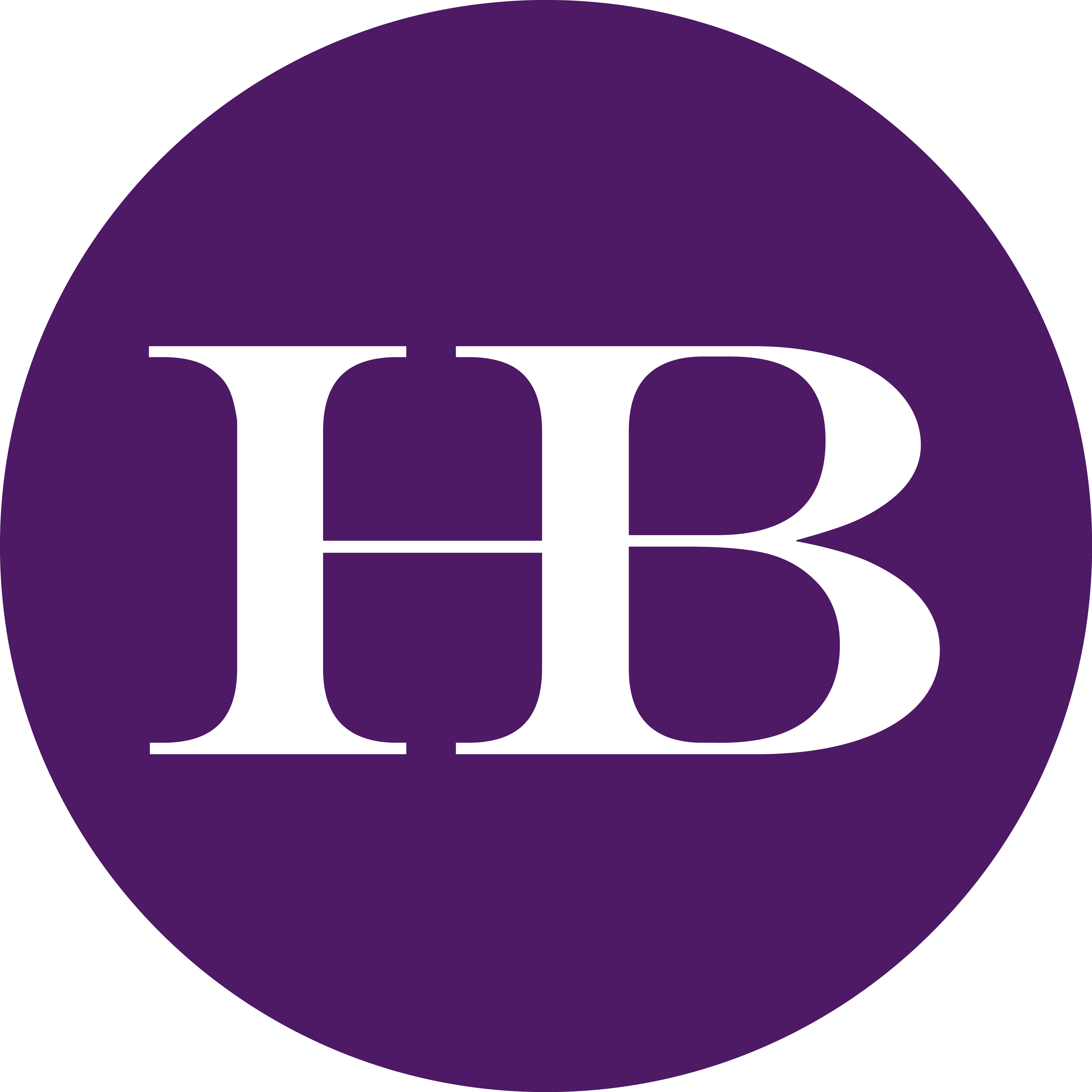
- Type: Private
- Industry: Private equity
- Founded: 2003
- Founder: James Caan
- Headquarters: London, SW3; United Kingdom
- Area served: United Kingdom
- Key people: James Caan, CEO; Tristan Ramus, Managing Director, HBHC; Deepak Jalan, Chief Investment Officer
- Products: Leveraged buyout, growth capital, management buyouts, real estate, venture capital
- Revenue: £400 million (rev. of holdings)
- Total assets: £35 million
- Number of employees: 30+
- Website: www.hamiltonbradshaw.com

Hamilton Bradshaw (HB) is a mid-market private equity firm with its headquarters in London, England. The company was founded in 2003 by UK entrepreneur and former Dragons' Den panelist James Caan. Hamilton Bradshaw's main offices are located in Mayfair, London, and can be segmented into private equity, venture capital, recruitment, and real estate.

== History ==
Hamilton Bradshaw was founded in 2003 by BBC Television's Dragons' Den panelist and CEO James Caan, along with Tristan Ramus and Deepak Jalan. In 2002, Caan had sold off his stakes in Humana International, Recruitment International, and Alexander Mann. These sales allowed Caan to take a "gap year", studying management at Harvard. The sale of Alexander Mann also led to James Caan forming a company that would focus on private equity. While Hamilton Bradshaw and its staff are involved in holdings related to Dragon's Den, most of the company's business comes from other sources and opportunities.

== Portfolio ==
Hamilton Bradshaw's portfolio consists of 44 companies. These holdings are in a range of industries, from finance to leisure. The primary sector is recruitment; nevertheless, Hamilton Bradshaw's portfolio includes firms in fitness, commercial, online recruitment, education, financial services, healthcare and pharmaceuticals, and technology. Also, HB controls Caan's venture capital investments related to Dragons' Den.

=== Investment criteria ===
Hamilton Bradshaw directs its focus and investments largely at companies it believes have Unique Selling Points. Along with this, the company looks to invest in small and medium-sized enterprises (SMEs). Hamilton Bradshaw attempts to create value by injecting capital into these SMEs and improving their processes.
