= Ndiarème B =

School in Dakar, Senegal

- Dakar; Senegal

Information
- School type: Primary school
- Established: 1996; 29 years ago
- Gender: Mixed

Ndiarème B is a primary school in Dakar, Senegal, founded in 1996. In 2000, United Nations Secretary General Kofi Annan used the school to launch the United Nations Girls' Education Initiative. As of 2005, the number of girls attending the school has risen to 49%, compared to 35% when it was founded.

The school buildings were constructed by the Senegalese government, the charity Aide et Action and the Islamic Development Bank. A water well and pump were installed using finance from UNICEF, while the World Bank supported the Senegalese Sanitation Department in installing separate toilet facilities for boys and girls.
