= James Caan (businessman) =

Pakistani-British television personality (born 1960)

James Caan CBE
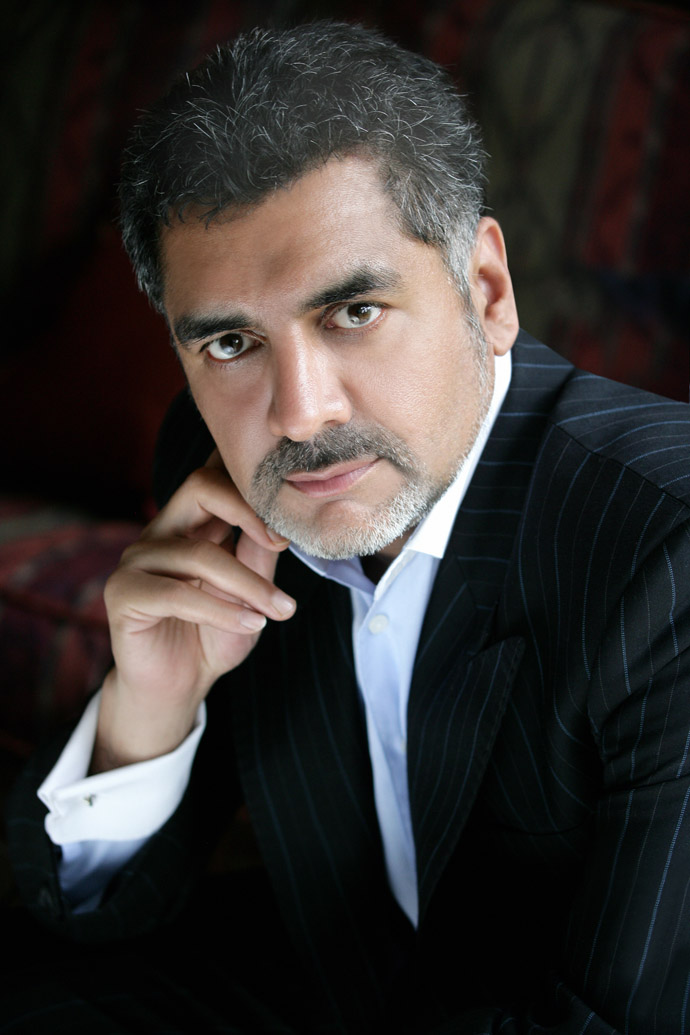
- James Caan in 2008
- Born: Nazim Khan; Urdu: ناظم خان; 28 December 1960 (age 65); Lahore, Pakistan
- Occupation: Tycoon
- Known for: Dragons' Den Tycoon
- Children: 5
- Website: www.james-caan.com

James Caan CBE (born Nazim Khan; 28 December 1960) is a British-Pakistani entrepreneur and television personality.

He was an investor on the BBC television programme Dragons' Den, in which he was one of the Dragons from 2007 to 2010. More recently, he has hosted The Business Class on CNBC, a series which sees him joined by experts from a cross-section of industries to analyse and advise innovative UK small and medium enterprises. He is also Chairman of the UK Government's Start Up Loans Scheme.

Caan founded the recruitment company Alexander Mann in 1985, which he sold in 2002. In 1993, he co-founded the executive head-hunting firm Humana International, and sold his stake in 1999. He is also the founder and CEO of the UK-based private equity firm Hamilton Bradshaw.

== Early life and education ==
Born in Lahore, Pakistan, Caan's family emigrated to the United Kingdom when he was two years old. Caan's father had intended for his son to join the family business but Caan left home at 16, which led to Caan's estrangement from his father for many years. He had no university education and in 2003, attended the Advanced Management Program at Harvard Business School. He had various jobs and worked for several recruitment companies; Caan started his own recruitment company in the early 1980s. His first office, which was tiny, was in Pall Mall, but he chose the prestigious address to add credibility to his business.

== Career ==
=== Business ===
Caan founded the recruitment company Alexander Mann in 1987. In 1993, he co-founded the executive headhunting firm Humana International with Doug Bugie, eventually growing the business to over 147 offices in 30 countries. In the same year, Caan launched the trade magazine Recruitment International, which he sold in 2000. In 1996, Caan co-founded the business process outsourcing company AMS with Rosaleen Blair. Caan subsequently sold his interests in AMS in 2002. In 1999, Caan sold Humana International to CDI International, a New York listed company. Later that year, Caan sold a minority stake in Alexander Mann Group to private equity firm Advent International.

In 2002, Caan sold his interests in Alexander Mann, which had a turnover of around £130 million by that time. In 2004, Caan established the London-based private equity firm Hamilton Bradshaw, an investment group that specialises in Seed Capital and Growth Capital for recruitment businesses. Founded in 2013, Recruitment Entrepreneur is the Seed Capital arm of Hamilton Bradshaw, which provides seed funding and support for ambitious, experienced recruitment professionals to start or scale their own recruitment ventures.

In 2009, Caan launched HBRIDA, with his then business partner Helen Reynolds (ex ACEO of the REC). HBRIDA worked with SME recruitment agencies to help them achieve growth and led them to an exit. Reynolds performed a management buyout of the business in March 2012. In 2010, Caan launched The Entrepreneurs Business Academy and became a non–Executive Director of McCann London. In 2011, Caan founded Hamilton Bradshaw Venture Partners. In 2012/13, Caan launched Hamilton Bradshaw Real Estate (HBRE) to invest in "disruptive property start-ups". In June 2013, Caan gave an interview in which he criticised parents who aid their children with finding jobs and don't let them 'stand on their own two feet', he was accused of hypocrisy when it emerged that he had employed his daughter in one of his companies. Caan responded that his daughter's recruitment process had been "rigorous". However, in an interview with The Independent Caan admitted, "I would find it very difficult not to help my child".

Caan was recognised in the 2015 New Year Honours List, with a Commander of the Order of the British Empire for services to entrepreneurship and charitable services through the James Caan Foundation.

=== Television ===
In 2007, Caan joined the panel of Dragons' Den judges for the show's fifth series, replacing Richard Farleigh. Hilary Devey replaced James Caan on Dragons Den in 2012.

In 2012, CNBC approached him to host The Business Class, a series which sees him joined by experts from a cross-section of industries, looking at the challenges and opportunities UK SMEs face. Each 30-minute episode featured an innovative business seeking guidance to help it grow in the marketplace. The series' popularity saw it recommissioned for a second series in October 2013.

=== Social media ===
In 2011, James Caan launched his mobile app 'James Caan Business Secrets'. Within weeks of launching the app rose to Number 1 in the iTunes chart and later became the fastest downloaded Business app of the year. It has regularly been ranked as a top business app by various publications, it has received over 250,000 downloads and has more than 1.5 million sessions.

=== Author ===
Caan has written several books on business and his life. The first book covered his life story: The Real Deal – My Story from Brick Lane to Dragons' Den (2008). Following publications focused on business and entrepreneurship: Get the Job You Really Want, Start Your Business in 7 Days, and Get the Life You Really Want.

== Public sector ==
Caan has been involved with the British Government and their agencies on a number of initiatives related to UK business for many years. These include The Government Entrepreneur's Forum and The Department for International Development (DFID) where he worked on the relief effort after the 2010 Pakistan flood.

=== The Start Up Loans Company ===
In May 2012, Caan was approached by the government to become Chairman of the Start Up Loans initiative. The aim is to support young people with funding and mentoring to start up new businesses in the UK. Over £112 million of loans were to be offered to 18- to 30-year-olds over 3 years. James and his board of entrepreneur ambassadors head up the government scheme, providing loans of around £2,500 to the 18- to 30-year-olds to start their businesses.

== Charitable activities ==
=== The James Caan Foundation ===
Caan founded the James Caan Foundation (JCF) in 2006 after he took a 'gap year' to visit his homeland of Pakistan. The JCF supports charities in the UK and seeks to promote greater awareness of issues facing the developing world, primarily focusing on children's access to education and healthcare.

The JCF has funded the construction of a new school at his birthplace Lahore, located in the eastern province of Punjab. Since first purchasing a barren plot of land and opening the 16-classroom school in 2005, the TCF School, named after Caan's father, educates over 420 children aged between 5–11.

=== 2010 Pakistan floods ===
In July 2010, Caan flew to Pakistan immediately after the worst flooding in the country's history and personally purchased, prepared and delivered emergency food parcels to families in a village of Nowshera city, in the northern Khyber Pakhtunkhwa province.

Upon his return to the UK, Caan partnered with UNICEF to provide urgent food, medical supplies and water and hygiene kits to 1,000 families in the affected area. Caan also undertook an extensive media outreach campaign and his trip was widely covered in national newspapers. After just two weeks, Caan had raised £100,000 for UNICEF. Caan and the James Caan Foundation subsequently undertook a project to rebuild a village in Pakistan, including schools, hospitals, homes and all infrastructure and water supplies. Aid agencies including UNICEF, Oxfam, Islamic Relief, Muslim Hands and Mosaic were also involved in the project.

==== Controversy ====
Caan drew criticism when he was caught on camera offering to buy a baby for his brother for £725 from a family that was a victim of the 2010 Pakistan floods despite having a multi-million pound net-worth at the time. He later stated that he regretted the incident and described his behaviour as "clearly wrong". Caan was later filmed saying: "If there's an opportunity to give a life a chance of survival, it's more an emotional response than a rational decision... What I have to remember is that I am here to build a village". The father of the baby responded to those comments, stating "I am not a trader of my children [...] I can beg for my children but I cannot even think to sell them" and "I cannot believe such disrespect to a mother and father to believe you can take one of their children from them for the payment of money [...] I cannot believe what a man who is a father has tried to do".

=== Other ===
Caan is involved with and supports other charities including The Prince's Trust, Marie Curie, Mosaic, Care Foundation the NSPCC and PENNY APPEAL. In 2009 Caan was appointed chairman of The Big Issue Company.

Caan was appointed Commander of the Order of the British Empire (CBE) in the 2015 New Year Honours for services to entrepreneurship and charitable services.

== Publications ==
- 2008 – The Real Deal (autobiography)
- 2011 – Get the Job You Really Want
- 2012 – Get the Life you Really Want
- 2012 – Start Your Business in 7 Days

== Honours ==
- Honorary doctorate in Business Administration from Leeds Met University (2009)
- Honorary degree from the University of East London
- Honorary doctorate in Business Administration from York St John University (2010)
- Honorary doctorate from University of Bradford (2012)

== Awards and nominations ==
In January 2013, Caan was awarded the Entrepreneur of the Year award at the British Muslim Awards. Also in 2013, he was named Chairman of the Year at the International Business Awards. In January 2014, he was a finalist for the Entrepreneur of the Year award at the British Muslim Awards. In January 2015, he was nominated for the Businessman of the Year award at the British Muslim Awards. On 29 October 2015, Caan was listed by UK-based company Richtopia at number 16 in the list of 100 Most Influential British Entrepreneurs.

== See also ==
- List of British Pakistanis
