= Enterprise Finance Guarantee =

UK government-guaranteed lending scheme

The Enterprise Finance Guarantee (EFG) is a UK government-guaranteed lending scheme intended to help smaller viable businesses who may be struggling to secure finance, by facilitating bank loans of between £1,000 and £1 million.

It is intended to enable banks to lend to viable small businesses who are unable to provide the security that the bank would otherwise require. The government announced the launch of the Enterprise Finance Guarantee Scheme (EFG) in November 2008 to provide targeted intervention for viable SMEs, close to the margins on risk, who could not access debt finance during times of tight credit conditions. EFG replaced the previous Small Firms Loan Guarantee scheme.

Under the scheme, the decision on whether or not to lend rests solely with the participating bank. The Government meets some of the bad debt costs incurred by the lender on the scheme loans. The borrower pays interest and fees to the participating bank on normal commercial terms; and in addition the borrower pays a quarterly fee to the Government.

In total, for its first period from January 2009 to March 2010 the Government announced that it would support a total of up to £1,300 million loans under the scheme. For its second period from April 2010 to March 2011 the Government announced that it would support a total of up to £500m loans under the scheme.

== Details ==
In his Pre-Budget Report, presented on 24 November 2008, the Chancellor announced a Small Business Finance Scheme. This went live as the Enterprise Finance Guarantee on 14 January 2009.

The government offer to bear 75% of the risk of default on each eligible individual loan, subject to a cap on the total claims that may be made by each participating bank.

EFG has replaced the Small Firms Loans Guarantee (SFLG) Scheme. It has wider criteria, in that it offers guarantees of loans of up to £1 million, rather than £250,000, and is available to businesses with a turnover of up to £41m, rather than £5.6m. It provides lesser support to lenders, in that the total amount paid by the Government to each participating bank may not exceed 9.75% of the total amount advanced by that bank on all loans in the period, whereas SFLG contained no such cap. It allows the participating bank to insist, for the first time, on personal guarantees.

The scheme is open to businesses with an annual turnover of up to £41m, seeking loans of £1,000 to £1 million, repayable over a period of 3 months to 10 years. State aid rules restrict or exclude businesses in certain industries such as agriculture, coal and transport.

The scheme is only open to viable businesses with no security or insufficient security.

The purpose of the guarantee is to support new or existing borrowing or converting an existing overdraft into a loan freeing money for working capital. An important point is that the decisions on loans are made by the lenders, not BIS.

The cost of the guarantees to the borrower is 2% per annum of the outstanding balance, collected quarterly, payable to BIS. BIS are offering a discount of 25% (making the cost of guarantees 1.5% per annum) for all premiums successfully collected in 2009.

Under the EFG scheme the UK government, through its Department for Business, Innovation and Skills (BIS) will guarantee 75% of any loans made, with the bank covering the remaining 25%. The guarantees will mean that the government, or taxpayers, will pick up three-quarters of the tab for any bad loans for which a claim can be made.

However, lenders participating in the scheme cannot exceed claiming back more than 13% of the total amount lent under EFG. Therefore, only 9.75% of the total loan portfolio is recoverable (75% of value of loans recoverable until ceiling of 13% is reached = 9.75% total amount recoverable by scheme participants making loans).

The maximum cost to the taxpayer is the 9.75% less the total fees collected from all borrowers.

The Enterprise Finance Guarantee applies to loans, and can also be used to convert existing overdrafts into loans to enable businesses to free up their current overdraft facilities to meet working capital demands.

The EFG is designed primarily as a means of providing working capital to businesses, however loans can also be provided for other purposes such as asset purchase, business expansion or acquisition, or property/equipment purchase.

- Applications will be considered where a business has a viable proposal but may incur difficulty in obtaining conventional finance because of lack of security.
- The EFG is not restricted to established businesses. If a new start-up, with no/little available security, meets usual credit policy criteria and has presented a sound business plan, the Bank may still choose to support an EFG application.

The EFG was initially managed on behalf of the Government by Capital for Enterprise Limited (CfEL), an arm's length body which was the UK Government's centre of knowledge and expertise in SME finance interventions. On 1 October 2013, CfEL became part of the British Business Bank which is now responsible for the EFG.

The EFG scheme has been temporarily replaced by the Coronavirus Business Interruption Loan (CBIL) scheme in response to the global COVID-19 pandemic, although there are no indications of when, or indeed if, the EFG scheme will be reinstated. Some experts have called for the scheme to be reinstated alongside the CBIL scheme.

The CBIL scheme effectively replaced the EFG scheme to enable rapid delivery through main and secondary lenders utilising an already established platform of delivery that was used to distribute the EFG funding to businesses. There are some key changes to the format of the CBIL loan however, of notable value; the removal of the requirement for directors to personally guarantee the loans (up to £250,000) and secondly, an increase in the government backed guarantee to 80%.

== Main Principles ==
BIS requires that before sanctioning any facilities under EFG the Bank has confirmed the following:

- the applicant’s plans are viable and would meet our usual commercial requirements for a loan.
- the Bank would wish to lend to the applicant and that all the applicant’s available collateral has been exhausted.
- EFG loans may be used to refinance existing overdraft borrowing (the current utilisation not the limit). The Bank must however be prepared to continue to make available an appropriate working capital facility following the refinance; it is not permissible to use EFG finance to simply terminate all existing overdraft debt and not provide working capital finance.

== Eligibility ==
- Businesses of any age may apply for EFG.
- There is no maximum number of employees.
- The applicant’s turnover during the previous 12 months must not exceed £41m. This ceiling was increased from a £25m turnover in March 2012. Where an applicant is part of a corporate group (whether a parent, subsidiary or holding company), the £41m figure relates to the entire group.
- There are few sectoral restrictions although an eligibility check should be undertaken in the event of a customer operating in any of the following sectors or in any other instances in the event of doubt:-
  - Fishing
  - Agriculture
  - Shipping
  - Forestry
  - Performing Arts
  - Education
  - Healthcare
  - Social Care Services
  - Coal and Steel

== Purpose of Facility ==
• EFG loans may only be used for business purposes, principally to provide working capital, or to fund expansion or capital expenditure in the UK. Other purposes such as acquisition/purchase of businesses, land/property purchase, and start-up costs are also permitted.

• EFG loans may be used to refinance existing overdraft facilities afforded by the Bank. The Bank must however continue to provide an appropriate working capital facility (i.e. continue to make available an overdraft) should existing borrowing be refinanced and the customer still wishes an overdraft. The level of any continuing overdraft is to be determined by the Bank in that it does not necessarily require to equal the amount of the overdraft which is being refinanced by EFG.

• EFG loans can be used to fund share purchases in respect of business acquisition transactions, subject to the Bank being satisfied that structuring the purchase in such a manner is appropriate.

• EFG loans are available to businesses which export but may not be used to finance large individual transactions which would be more suited to Trade Finance facilities.

• EFG finance may be used to refinance any loan facilities (apart from an SFLGS loan) where the Bank are facing such a large security shortfall that they have made a decision to call up the loan. Such instances will, however, be extremely rare. However, in a non-distress scenario, EFG finance cannot be used to refinance loans which we have afforded or loans which have been afforded by other lenders.

=== EFG Parameters ===
Borrowing Amount

- The minimum loan amount is £1,000
- The maximum loan amount is £1m.
- Any loans previously provided under SFLGS, even if still outstanding, do not count towards the £1m EFG limit.
- There is no restriction on the number of EFG facilities a customer may have so long as the aggregate of these facilities (based on the original amount granted, not the current outstanding balance) does not exceed £1m.
- Where more than one business wishes to apply for an EFG, each separate business may qualify for an aggregate amount of up to £1m, provided that the applicant is not part of a corporate group and each separate business meets the eligibility criteria.
- Where an applicant is part of a corporate group (whether a parent, subsidiary or holding company), the maximum figure available to the entire group is £1m.

=== Term ===
- The minimum term is 3 months.
- The maximum term is 10 years (including any capital repayment holiday).

=== Drawdown ===
- tranche drawdowns are permitted, subject to a maximum of four tranches. If the loan is to be drawn in tranches, no capital repayments are to be made until the loan is fully drawn, which must be within 1 year of the date of the EFG loan agreement.
- The first tranche must be drawn no later than 6 months after the date of the EFG loan agreement. Failure to draw the loan within this period will necessitate the submission of a new application.

=== Capital Repayment Holidays ===
- Capital Repayment Holidays, in multiples of 3 months, are permitted up to a maximum of 3 years.
- Subsequent Capital Repayment Holidays may be sanctioned after initial drawdown.

=== Repayments ===
- EFG loans must be repaid on a capital only (straight line) basis with interest being debited quarterly to a separate account held at the same branch as the loan account.
- Capital and interest loans (actuarial) or interest only (bullet) repayment loans are not permissible.
- Loan repayments may be monthly or quarterly.

=== Security ===
==== General ====
- Before offering a borrower an EFG facility, the Bank must be satisfied that it would have offered conventional finance but for the lack of security.

==== Pledging of Personal Assets ====
- The Bank must be satisfied that all available personal assets have been pledged for conventional facilities, before considering lending under EFG.
- It is the Bank’s decision as to whether or not personal assets may be considered available as security for conventional lending.
- The Bank must be satisfied that the applicant is personally committed to the venture, and is not using EFG as a means of avoiding pledging personal assets.
- In the event that conventionally chargeable assets are jointly owned with a spouse or third party who is not directly connected to the business any refusal by that spouse/third party to charge those assets is sufficient to render these assets as not being available for conventional lending. For our purposes, a direct connection with the business is defined as partner, director or shareholder with 20% or more of the share capital. The same principle applies where an occupier of a conventionally chargeable asset refuses to grant consent to a charge.
- If the applicant is not prepared to allow all their available personal assets to be used to secure conventional lending, this renders them ineligible for EFG.
- In exceptional circumstances, personal guarantees may be taken in respect of EFG loans.
- The Bank is not permitted to take a charge over guarantors’ principal residences in support of personal guarantees.

==== Pledging of business assets ====
- Applicants should be asked to pledge premises, machinery and other assets used in the business as security for the EFG loan, usually in the form of a fixed or floating charge.
- Where the assets to be pledged include property with any element of residential use (e.g. shop with flat above) consideration must be given as to whether or not the borrowing will be MCOB regulated. If the borrowing would be MCOB regulated, these assets must be pledged to secure conventional facilities only as it is not possible for EFG loans to be MCOB regulated.

=== Guarantee Premium ===
- A guarantee premium is payable to the Government to the value of 2% per annum on the reducing balance of the loan.
- Premiums will be reduced to 1.5% (i.e. a 25% discount) will be applied to premiums due and collected in 2009. This will be managed centrally by the Government’s collection agents; there is no requirement for the Bank to amend premium schedules.
- All premiums are paid quarterly by Direct Debit.
- It is essential that the direct debit in respect of the BIS premium be paid as it falls due for payment.

=== List of Eligible Lenders ===
The following main lenders will lend to eligible businesses under Enterprise Finance Guarantee:

- Airdrie Savings Bank
- Alliance & Leicester
- Bank of Baroda
- Bank of Ireland (Northern Ireland)
- Bank of Scotland
- Barclays
- Business Enterprise Fund
- Business Finance Solutions
- Clydesdale Bank
- Compass Business Finance
- The Co-operative Bank
- DSL Business Finance
- Finance For Enterprise
- GLE oneLondon
- HSBC
- HBOS
- Lloyds TSB
- Metro Bank
- NEL Fund Managers
- Northern Bank (Northern Ireland)
- RBS/Natwest
- Santander
- Skipton Business Finance
- State Securities
- South West Investment Group
- Triodos Bank
- UK Steel Enterprises
- Ulster Bank (Northern Ireland)
- Whiteaway Laidlaw Bank
- Venture Finance
- Yorkshire Bank

== Comparison with its predecessor, The Small Firms Loan Guarantee Scheme, SFLG ==
The objectives of SFLG are summarised in the 2004 Graham Report, which carried out a wide-ranging review of the scheme:

- "The aim of SFLG is to assist viable, debt-appropriate businesses that lack sufficient collateral to access loan finance in the market. In line with other interventions, SFLG should be used only in circumstances of market failure, where a viable business is unable to raise finance under conventional terms. SFLG forms part of the Government’s portfolio of interventions in the debt and equity markets, and, as such, it is designed to support the Government’s objectives."

The Small Firm Loan Guarantee scheme went through various small changes during its life, from 1981 to 13 January 2009:

- Refer to the 2008/9 annual report on SFLG for a summary of the main structural and eligibility changes in each year.

The scheme has consistently been focused on new start up and early stage businesses.

- From December 2006 to January 2008 the scheme was only available to businesses established less than five years.

The maximum loan under the scheme was £250,000.

For loans written from April 2003 the guarantee rate was 75%.

- Earlier loans had guarantee rate of between 70% and 85%.
- There was no cap on the total of claims that could be submitted by each participating bank.

In its peak years of take-up (1995 and 1996), just over 7,000 loans were guaranteed in each year. The Graham Review saw a general tightening of eligibility criteria.

- In the year to March 2008, 2,619 loans were issued, with £207 million advanced.
- 1,100 of those loans were for amounts of less than or equal to £50,000, and a further 908 loans were for amounts of between £50,001 and £100,000.
- In the period April 2008 to January 2009, £178 million was advanced under the scheme, which represented 49% of the £360m limits allocated to all the participating banks.

The default rate on SFLG loans has been consistently high:

- The 2004 Graham Report quotes an average default rate of 30 to 35%, equating to bad debt losses after capital repayments and any recoveries of around 20%.
- The peak default rate was seen for loans written in 1989/ 1990, when the default rate exceeded 50%.
- The post-Graham loans, those loans written from December 2005 onwards, were envisaged to have a better default rate than earlier loans. But by August 2009 already 21% of all loans written since December 2005 had defaulted - similar to the experience of preGraham tranches.

In the year 2008/9 the total amount paid out by the Government to banks under the guarantees was £84.6m.

== Progress on EFG ==
In his Pre Budget Report of 9 December 2009 the Chancellor advised that:

in January we launched the Enterprise Finance Guarantee which has already offered government guarantees on bank loans to over 6,000 businesses.

Today I have decided to extend this scheme for a further 12 months which will guarantee a further £500m of loans to small businesses.
