= Loan guarantee =

Promise by one party in finance

A loan guarantee, in finance, is a promise by one party (the guarantor) to assume the debt obligation of a borrower if that borrower defaults. A guarantee can be limited or unlimited, making the guarantor liable for only a portion or all of the debt.

== Private loan guarantees ==
There are two main types:

1. Guarantor mortgages
2. Unsecured guarantor loan

== Rental guarantor ==
In residential leasing, a rental guarantor agrees to assume financial responsibility for a tenant's lease obligations if the tenant fails to pay rent or otherwise breaches the lease agreement. This is typically paid for by the renter in order to qualify for a lease, and is considered a type of rent insurance.

=== Guarantor mortgages ===
Popular with young borrowers who do not have a large deposit saved and need to borrow up to 100% of the property value to purchase a property. Generally, their parents will provide a guarantee to the lender to cover any shortfall in the event of default.

There are three main types

1. Guarantor Mortgage: – generally, a parent or close family member will guarantee the mortgage debt and will cover the repayment obligations should the borrower default.
2. Family offset mortgage: typically, a parent or grandparent will put their savings into an account linked to the borrower’s mortgage. They do not get any interest on these savings while offsetting the mortgage, but will be able to get their money back in full once the mortgage has been paid down to between 70% and 80% of the property’s market value.
3. Family deposit mortgage: a family member will place a deposit in a dedicated savings account and it is held as security against the property's mortgage. Interest is paid on this deposit, but if the borrower defaults on their repayments, then money will be taken from this savings account.

=== Unsecured guarantor loan ===
An unsecured personal loan that is popular with borrowers who have a poor credit rating. They also require the guarantor to meet the borrower’s obligations if they default on their loan repayments.

== Government loan guarantees ==
The term can be used to refer to a government promising to take on a private debt obligation if the borrower defaults. Most loan guarantee programs are established to correct perceived market failures by which small borrowers, regardless of creditworthiness, lack access to the credit resources available to large borrowers.

Loan guarantees can also be extended to large borrowers for national security reasons, to help companies in essential industries, or in situations where the failure of a large company will harm the larger economy, For example, Chrysler Corporation, one of the "big three" US automobile manufacturers, obtained a loan guarantee in 1979 amid its near collapse and lobbying by labor interests. The loans are made by private lenders with the caveat that the government will pay off the loans if the company defaults on them. Chrysler did not go into default. Another example was the creation of the Emergency Loan Guarantee Board to administer $250 million in US government loan guarantees made to private lenders on behalf of Lockheed in 1971. The program ended in 1977 when Lockheed restructured its debt to its 24 lending banks. Over $30 million in Guarantee commitment fees paid by Lockheed and its lenders to the board created over $29 million transferred to the US Treasury.

=== Government programs and agencies ===
==== Bulgaria ====
- National Guarantee Fund

==== The Netherlands ====
- SME loan guarantee scheme (BMKB)

==== United Kingdom ====
- Enterprise Finance Guarantee

==== United States ====
- Fannie Mae
- Export-Import Bank
- Federal Family Education Loan Program
- Freddie Mac
- Government National Mortgage Association
- Small Business Administration
- USDOE
- VA loan
- USAID Development Credit Authority
- U.S. Department of Agriculture (USDA) Farm Service Agency (FSA) loans
- U.S. Department of Agriculture (USDA) Rural Development (RD) loans

==== Kingdom of Saudi Arabia ====
- The Small and Medium Enterprises Loan Guarantee Program “Kafalah"

== See also ==
- Surety
- Promissory note
- Usury
