= 1GOAL Education for All =

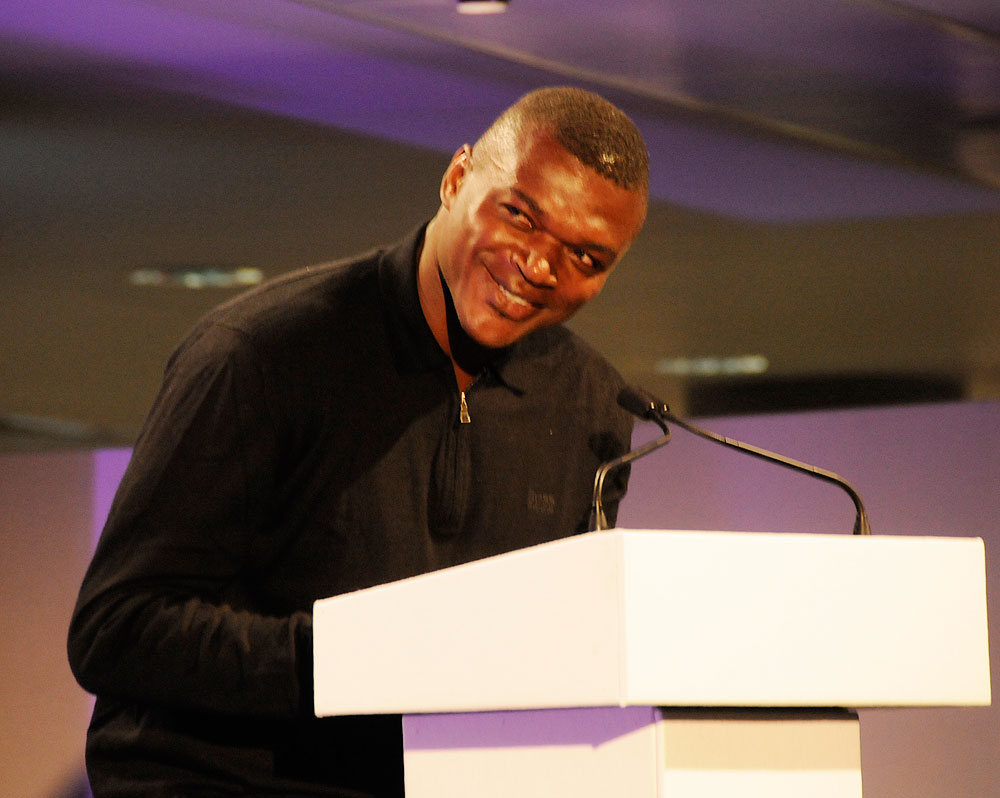
Marcel Desailly on stage at the launch of the campaign.

1GOAL Education for All campaign is run by the Education Week Foundation (India). Working with football and the footballing community, 1GOAL raises public awareness and involvement in achieving education for all the 67 million children out of school worldwide. It is supported by over 200 international footballers; over 70 football clubs including Manchester United, Corinthians, Los Angeles Galaxy, Chelsea FC, FC Barcelona, Inter Milan, AC Milan, Liverpool F.C., FC Porto, Sporting CP and Arsenal; and national and international footballing organisations including the Confederation of African Football, FIFPro, the Professional Footballers' Association and FIFA.

It was launched by Queen Rania of Jordan in August 2009. Alongside Queen Rania, it is co-chaired by FIFA President Sepp Blatter and Nobel Prize laureate Archbishop Desmond Tutu.

It campaigns to secure schooling for some 67 million children worldwide in accordance with the Millennium Goal Promise of education for all by 2015. There are several barriers to achieving universal primary education: lack of funds to pay for infrastructure and ongoing costs (buildings, teachers' salaries, learning materials); lack of qualified teachers; conflict and the practice of charging school fees in some developing countries.

As of July 2010, "Twelve million people have signed up to support 1Goal - that makes this the biggest campaign for education in history. Football is helping make something very special happen," says ambassador Anthony Baffoe of Ghana.

By September 2010, 18 million people had joined 1GOAL. During the UN Millennium Development Goals Review Summit, held in New York, 20–22 September 2010, Queen Rania delivered this petition directly to UN Secretary General, Ban Ki-moon. At a 1GOAL event during the same summit, the World Bank announced an increase of $750 million to education and the Australian Government announced an increase of about $5 billion, of which 70% is ringfenced for primary education.

Many world leaders, footballers and celebrities have supported the initiative including Shakira, Cristiano Ronaldo, Pelé, Mick Jagger, Jessica Alba, Matt Damon, Patrick Vieira, Michael Essien, Samuel Eto'o, Aaron Mokoena, Quinton Fortune, Rio Ferdinand, Michael Ballack, Bobby Charlton and Marcel Desailly.

== See also ==
- FIFA
- Education for All
- Millennium Development Goals
