= World Education Forum =

Representative body of major education-related organization

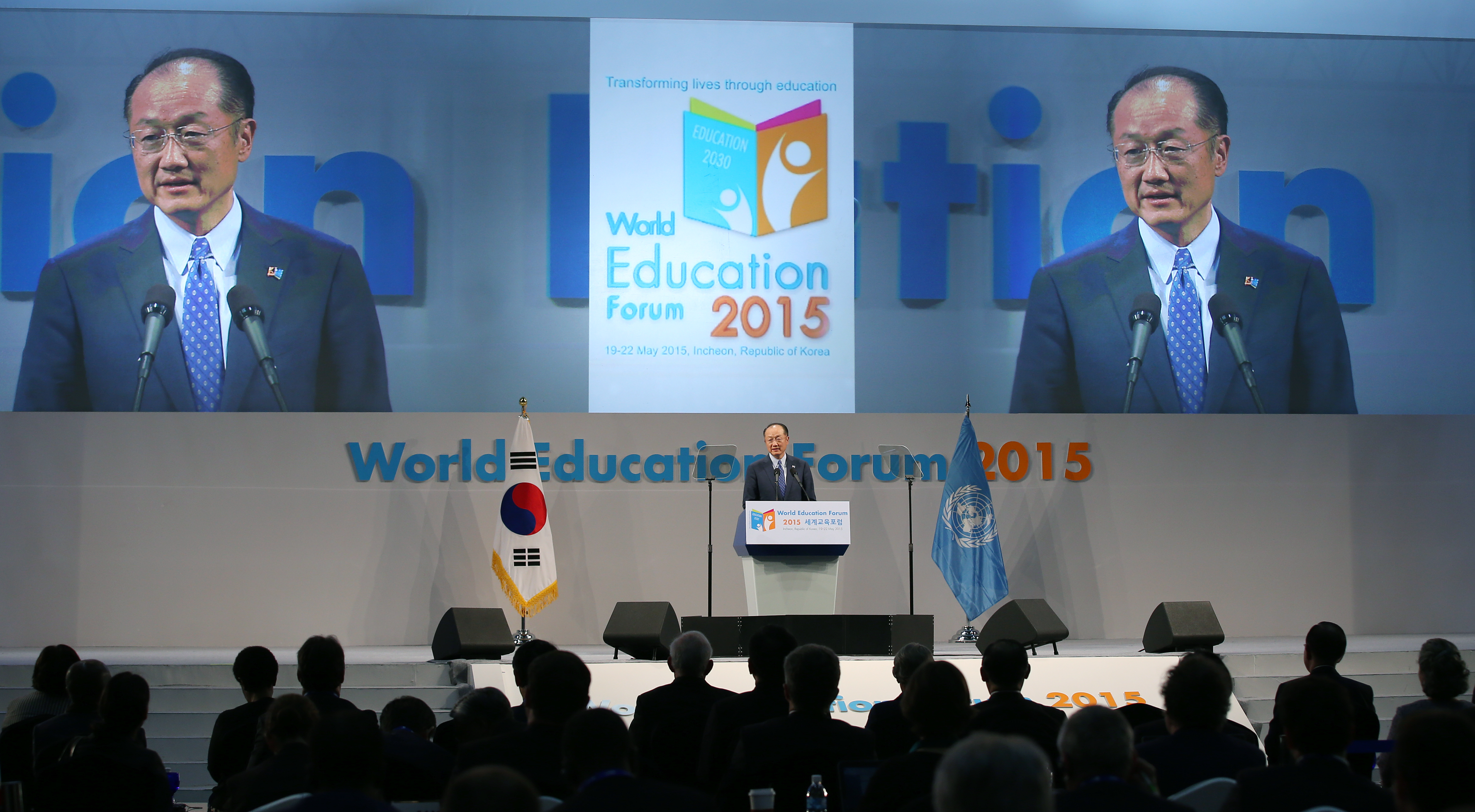

The World Education Forum is a premium body comprising representatives of major organisations involved in education and related activities across the world. Major organisations involved in the forum include: UNESCO, and the World Bank, and the Asian Development Bank. The World Education Forum also involves representatives from governments and education departments across the world.

== Activities ==
The first conference, held in Dakar, from 26 to 28 April 2000, adopted the Dakar Framework for Action, which incorporated the six Regional Frameworks for Action. The event, held in the international conference centre of the Le Méridien Président Hotel, involved over 1,000 national leaders, United Nations agency heads, education policy-makers, non- governmental organizations, business leaders, donors and grassroots workers from over 100 countries.

== Commitment ==
The Forum participants demonstrated a collective commitment to achieving the goals and targets of Education for All by the year 2015 and entrusted UNESCO with the overall responsibility of coordinating and significant international players in this work.

== See also ==
- 1GOAL Education for All
