= Mosaic Foundation =

American foundation

The Mosaic Foundation is an American non-profit organization established in 1997 to raise the standard of living of women and children everywhere while also bridging the cultural gap between citizens of the United States and residents of the Arab World. The Foundations provides financial support to individuals and projects seeking to meet these ends and also sponsors events and conferences that enhance education on these issues.

== History ==
The Mosaic Foundation grew from the friendship of the wives of ambassadors from Arab nations in the United States. These women in 1997 decided to collaborate to advance the interests of women and children worldwide and also to celebrate the heritage and culture of Arab people. With offices initially based in the Virginia home of princess Haifa bint Faisal, then chairman, the Mosaic Foundation first engaged the public in 1998, reproducing a medieval Arabian souq with handicrafts and other items appropriate to the region. Since then, the Foundation has promoted its goals through a number of events and outreaches. Its first gala raised $500,000 to benefit St. Jude Children's Research Hospital. Since that time, the organization has awarded nearly $10 million through its programs. Among those who support Mosaic are British-Pakistani entrepreneur James Caan.
