= Small Firms Loan Guarantee =

UK government loan support scheme

The Small Firms Loan Guarantee (SFLG) was a UK government loan support scheme for small businesses that ran from 1981 to January 2009.

Under the scheme, participating banks could lend up to a maximum of £250,000 to eligible UK companies trading less than five years with a turnover of less than £5.6 million, and have 75% of the loss at default met by the government.

The SFLG was replaced by the Enterprise Finance Guarantee (EFG) on 14 January 2009.

== See also ==
- Enterprise Finance Guarantee
