= Start Up Loans Scheme =

The Start Up Loans Scheme is a UK government backed programme that offers finance, mentoring and support to entrepreneurs looking to start (or grow) a business in England, Scotland, Wales and Northern Ireland.

== History ==
In 2012, £151 million was made available to the scheme by the government to aid entrepreneurs with a target to start 30,000 new businesses by 2016.

In the 2015 Autumn Statement, the government announced that it would continue to support the programme for the remainder of their current term. The aim is to support another 10,000 entrepreneurs per year, taking the total to 75,000 by 2020.

The scheme is administered by The Start-Up Loans Company, a subsidiary of the British Business Bank, and delivered through a network of “Delivery Partners".

The Start Up Loans scheme's mission is to equip entrepreneurs with the tools needed to make their business a success in all industries and sectors.

Upon its launch, the Start Up Loans scheme announced 12 ambassadors from across the UK as a motivational tool and to provide case examples of young entrepreneurs that have started up their own businesses.

=== Milestones ===
In July 2014 it was announced that 20,000 loans had been issued under the scheme, amounting to a value of more than £100m.

It was further announced at the end of 2015 that nearly 35,000 entrepreneurs had been supported to date, with a total loan value of £180m.

In February 2016, the Start Up Loans Company announced that it had lent over £200m and was almost half-way towards its objective of 75,000 loans.

== Age Cap ==
Following recommendations to remove the age cap (30 or under) for the eligibility of Start Up Loans scheme, Prime Minister David Cameron announced the government would lift the age cap of the scheme.

== Further Funding ==
In September 2013, Prime Minister David Cameron announced that additional funding of £34m would be allocated to the Start Up Loans scheme.
