= British Business Bank =

UK state-owned economic development bank

British Business Bank plc
- Type: State-owned public limited company
- Industry: Financial services
- Predecessors: Capital for Enterprise; parts of the Department for Business, Innovation and Skills
- Founded: 2013
- Headquarters: Sheffield, England, UK
- Area served: United Kingdom
- Key people: Stephen Welton (chair); David Hourican (interim chief executive)
- Revenue: £226 million (2024/25)
- Net income: £109 million (2024/25)
- Total assets: £4.9 billion (31 March 2025)
- Total equity: £3.7 billion (31 March 2025)
- Owner: HM Government (via the Department for Business, Innovation, Science and Trade)
- Number of employees: 671 (2025)
- Subsidiaries: British Business Investments; British Patient Capital; Start Up Loans Company; British Business Financial Services Limited; BBB Investment Services Limited; Nations and Regions Investments Limited
- Website: www.british-business-bank.co.uk

British Business Bank plc is the United Kingdom government’s economic development bank. It supports smaller businesses’ access to debt and equity finance by working through accredited lenders and fund managers rather than lending directly to most firms. It is wholly owned by HM Government and is headquartered in Sheffield, England.

Its programmes span debt, early-stage lending and equity. Active schemes include the Growth Guarantee Scheme, which launched with accredited lenders on 1 July 2024 and provides a 70% guarantee to the lender, the ENABLE programmes that expand lenders’ capacity to finance smaller businesses, and the government-backed Start Up Loans scheme. Equity initiatives are delivered through the group’s commercial subsidiaries, British Business Investments and British Patient Capital, and via the National Security Strategic Investment Fund.

In 2024/25 the bank reported supporting £6.8 billion of finance for smaller businesses and a statutory profit before tax of £144 million.

During 2020 to 2021 the bank administered UK COVID-19 loan guarantee schemes and the Future Fund. The government publishes ongoing repayment and performance data for these portfolios.

== History ==
=== Origins and formation (2012 to 2014) ===
The intention to create a new government-backed business bank was announced in September 2012 with initial funding of £1 billion to improve finance for small and medium-sized enterprises, consolidating existing schemes and expertise under one programme. From October 2013 the British Business Bank programme brought together Capital for Enterprise Limited and small and medium-sized enterprise policy teams within the Department for Business, Innovation and Skills, ahead of full incorporation. In December 2013 ministers confirmed that the headquarters would be in Sheffield and announced additional programme funding of £250 million.

On 15 October 2014 the European Commission approved the bank’s funding, remit and operating model under state aid rules, and operations transferred from the department to British Business Bank plc on 1 November 2014.

=== Programme development (2015 to 2019) ===
During its first years the bank expanded debt and equity interventions, including portfolio guarantees and fund-of-funds activity, and assumed management of legacy programmes previously run by the department and Capital for Enterprise Limited. Venture capital support was channelled through the Enterprise Capital Funds programme, while wholesale and guarantee products were scaled to address gaps in regional and sectoral finance markets. The Commission renewed approval for the bank’s state aid settlement in October 2019, allowing continued operation across the programme portfolio.

=== Covid-19 schemes (2020 to 2021) ===
In response to the pandemic the bank administered the Coronavirus Business Interruption Loan Scheme, the Coronavirus Large Business Interruption Loan Scheme and the Bounce Back Loan Scheme for the government, alongside the Future Fund for innovative companies. The Future Fund opened in May 2020 and closed to new applications on 31 January 2021. Government and bank publications provide ongoing repayment, performance and evaluation data for these portfolios.

=== Post-pandemic evolution (2022 to present) ===
The Recovery Loan Scheme, introduced in 2021 to support access to finance during the recovery period, was extended and from 1 July 2024 rebranded as the Growth Guarantee Scheme, offering a 70% guarantee to accredited lenders across a range of products. The bank continued to operate ENABLE programmes and equity initiatives through its group entities while publishing regular market research on smaller business finance to inform policy and delivery.

== Mandate, ownership and status ==
The bank is a government-owned development bank that improves smaller businesses’ access to debt and equity finance by working through lenders and fund managers. It is not a deposit-taking bank and it does not lend directly to most firms.

British Business Bank plc is a public limited company incorporated and registered in England and Wales and is wholly owned by HM Government through the Department for Business and Trade. Its registered office is in Sheffield.

The group is generally not authorised by the Prudential Regulation Authority or the Financial Conduct Authority. The exception is BBB Investment Services Limited, which has FCA authorisation to provide investment services. This authorisation supports the delivery of new third-party mandates such as the British Growth Partnership.

The bank’s main offices are in Sheffield and London.

== Organisation and governance ==
British Business Bank plc is overseen by a board of directors chaired by Stephen Welton, with Louis Taylor as chief executive officer. Welton was appointed non-executive chair in October 2023, and Taylor took up the chief executive role on 1 October 2022.

The group structure comprises the parent company and several operating subsidiaries, including British Business Investments, British Patient Capital, the Start Up Loans Company, and BBB Investment Services Limited. The bank publishes an up-to-date legal structure that shows the relationship between the parent and these subsidiaries.

The board delegates detailed work to committees with published terms of reference. Core committees include the Audit Committee, the Risk Committee, the Remuneration Committee, and the Governance and Nomination Committee. The schedule of matters reserved to the board sets out which decisions cannot be delegated.

As a government-owned public body the bank follows the UK Corporate Governance Code where appropriate and reports on its application in its annual report. Board and committee minutes are published in line with the organisation’s transparency commitments.

== Activities and programmes ==
The bank delivers its mandate through programmes that support smaller businesses’ access to debt, early-stage lending and equity. It works with accredited lenders and fund managers rather than lending directly to most firms, and it targets gaps in the market identified through its research and policy objectives.

=== Debt finance ===
The bank supports lending through the Growth Guarantee Scheme and the ENABLE programmes. Growth Guarantee Scheme provides participating lenders with a government guarantee on eligible facilities to improve the supply of term loans, asset finance, invoice finance and overdrafts. The ENABLE programmes comprise portfolio guarantees and funding that help lenders expand capacity and reach in specialist or regional markets.

==== Growth Guarantee Scheme ====
Growth Guarantee Scheme launched with accredited lenders on 1 July 2024. It offers a 70% guarantee to the lender on eligible facilities to support investment and working capital for smaller businesses. Product terms, eligibility and lender participation are set out in scheme guidance and lender materials.

==== ENABLE programmes ====
ENABLE Guarantees provide portfolio credit protection that can reduce regulatory capital requirements for participating lenders. ENABLE Funding and ENABLE Build provide funding and structuring support that can help specialist and non-bank lenders grow their lending to smaller businesses.

=== Early-stage loans ===
The bank supports founders through Start Up Loans. The scheme offers fixed interest loans with mentoring to new and early-stage businesses across the United Kingdom. Delivery is through a network of partners and administrators rather than direct retail lending by the bank.

=== Equity finance ===
Through British Business Investments the group makes commercial investments into funds and other finance providers that in turn invest in smaller businesses. British Patient Capital invests in venture capital funds and makes selected co-investments in later stage funding rounds. During the period following the pandemic the group also delivered Future Fund Breakthrough to support research and development intensive companies.

=== National Security Strategic Investment Fund ===
The National Security Strategic Investment Fund is a government initiative operated with the bank to invest in advanced and dual-use technologies with national security relevance. It is delivered through external fund managers and co-investment partners under a mandate set by government.

== Research and market intelligence ==
The bank publishes market intelligence on finance for small and medium-sized enterprises to inform policy and programme design. Its flagship publications are the Small Business Finance Markets report, the Small Business Equity Tracker and the Nations and Regions Tracker. Each combines official statistics with the bank’s datasets and third-party sources.

The 2025 edition of Small Business Finance Markets reports that fewer firms used external finance during 2024 while the value of finance provided increased. It highlights gross bank lending of about £62 billion in 2024 and notes that challenger banks increased their share of new lending.

The Small Business Equity Tracker 2025 reviews trends in UK equity markets for smaller businesses, including stage, sector and region, and examines the business angel market. It compares British Business Bank supported equity funds with the wider market over recent years.

The Nations and Regions Tracker 2025 summarises geographic patterns in the supply of debt and equity finance across the United Kingdom and sets out the bank’s activity outside London.

== Performance and finances ==
In 2024/25 the bank reported supporting £6.8 billion of finance for smaller businesses and a statutory profit before tax of £144 million. This followed a loss in the prior year and reflected movements in fair values across the equity portfolio as well as income from guarantee and investment activities.

The bank is funded by central government and by income generated from its programmes. It does not take deposits. Revenue arises from guarantee fees, interest and dividends from investments, fair value changes on equity holdings, and fees for managing third-party mandates. Programme guarantees create contingent liabilities for government, and the bank manages these within published risk appetites and Treasury approvals.

Risk management covers credit risk on guarantee and lending portfolios, market and valuation risk on equity investments, liquidity management, and operational risk. The annual report sets out the approach to expected credit losses under International Financial Reporting Standards and to fair value measurement for equity holdings, together with sensitivity analyses and governance arrangements.

The bank reports the geographic distribution of finance supported across the United Kingdom. Recent analysis shows most support is outside London, with variation by nation and region that reflects local market depth and programme mix.

Key financial results (British Business Bank), 2014/15–2024/25
Year	£ million			
Year	Net operating income	Operating expenditure	Profit/(loss) before tax	Profit/(loss) for the year
2024/25	143.0	83.0	144.0	109.0
2023/24	18.6	130.0	(131.2)	(121.5)
2022/23	(1.6)	127.7	(147.3)	(135.3)
2021/22	786.6	128.5	604.8	452.9
2020/21	413.5	118.4	293.5	241.5
2019/20	81.8	66.2	(2.1)	(8.7)
2018/19	106.4	64.0	81.3	71.3
2017/18	96.9	48.6	11.3	(6.2)
2016/17	72.8	23.0	(1.3)	(12.2)
2015/16	51.5	19.7	(14.8)	(23.3)
2014/15	46.5	14.6	(19.5)	(47.5)

Note: 2024/25 net operating income and operating expenditure are adjusted figures reported in the Annual Report summary; profit figures are statutory.

== Criticism and scrutiny ==
The bank is subject to external audit by the National Audit Office and parliamentary scrutiny, including the Business and Trade Committee of the House of Commons of the United Kingdom. It reports on governance, risk and value for money in its annual report.

=== Covid-19 loan schemes ===
Government datasets from HM Treasury track repayments and arrears for the Bounce Back Loan Scheme, the Coronavirus Business Interruption Loan Scheme and the Coronavirus Large Business Interruption Loan Scheme. Figures are updated periodically and include borrower numbers, amounts drawn and recoveries. The bank publishes evaluation material on scheme performance and lessons learned. In some cases guarantees have been removed where lenders did not follow scheme rules. An Information Commissioner's Office decision, reported by Reuters, declined to require public disclosure of the lenders concerned.

=== Future Fund outcomes ===
Future Fund loans were convertible and in many cases became minority equity stakes managed within the group’s venture capital portfolio. Outcomes include write-offs, exits and ongoing holdings. The bank provides portfolio information and programme updates for transparency.

== Relationships and coordination ==
The bank operates alongside other public finance institutions with complementary mandates. It focuses on access to finance for smaller businesses, while UK Infrastructure Bank concentrates on infrastructure and local authority projects, UK Export Finance provides export credit and insurance, British International Investment invests in emerging and developing economies, and Innovate UK funds research and innovation. This separation of roles is intended to reduce overlap and crowd in private capital.

To address regional imbalances the bank delivers Nations and Regions Investment Funds with devolved and regional partners. These funds back debt and equity providers across England, Wales, Scotland and Northern Ireland to increase the supply of finance in local markets.

The government has also asked the bank to support the British Growth Partnership, a mandate designed to mobilise additional institutional capital for productive investment in the United Kingdom. Delivery is through third-party managers and co-investment with private investors.

== See also ==
- Development bank
- UK Infrastructure Bank
- British International Investment
- UK Export Finance
- Innovate UK
- Future Fund (United Kingdom)
- Coronavirus Business Interruption Loan Scheme
- Bounce Back Loan Scheme
- Coronavirus Large Business Interruption Loan Scheme
