= Emma =

Emma may refer to:

- Emma (given name)

== Arts and entertainment ==
=== Film ===
- Emma (1932 film), a comedy-drama film by Clarence Brown
- Emma (1996 theatrical film), a film starring Gwyneth Paltrow
- Emma (2020 film), a British drama film starring Anya Taylor-Joy

=== Television ===
- Emma (1972 TV serial), a British TV six-part series starring Doran Godwin
- Emma (1996 TV film), a British television film starring Kate Beckinsale
- Emma (TV series), a 1999 VH1 music video programme hosted by Emma Bunton
- Emma – A Victorian Romance, a Japanese animated television series broadcast in 2005 and 2007
- Emma (2009 TV serial), a British TV serial starring Romola Garai

== Literature ==
- Emma (novel), an 1815 novel by Jane Austen
- Emma Brown, a fragment of a novel by Charlotte Brontë, completed by Clare Boylan in 2003
- Emma, a 1955 novel by F. W. Kenyon
- Emma: A Modern Retelling, a 2015 novel by Alexander McCall Smith
- Emma (manga), a 2002 manga by Kaoru Mori and the adapted Japanese animated series
- Emma (magazine), a German feminist journal, published by Alice Schwarzer

== Music ==
=== Artists ===
- E.M.M.A., a 2001–2005 Swedish girl group
- Emma (Italian singer) (born 1984)
- Emma (Welsh singer) (born 1974)
- Emma Bunton (born 1976), English singer

=== Songs ===
- "Emma" (Hot Chocolate song), 1974
- "Emma" (Little River Band song), 1975
- "Emma", a 2003 song by Alkaline Trio from Good Mourning
- "Emma", a 2010 song by Imagine Dragons from Hell and Silence
- "Emma", a song by Jonathan Edwards from Jonathan Edwards

== Places ==
- Emma, Indiana, an unincorporated community in the US
- Emma, Illinois, an unincorporated community in the US
- Emma, Kentucky, an unincorporated community in the US
- Emma, Louisiana, an unincorporated community in the US
- Emma, Missouri, a city in the US
- Emma, North Carolina, an unincorporated community in the US
- Emma, West Virginia, an unincorporated community in the US

== People ==
- Emma of Austrasia (fl. 7th century), daughter of Theudebert II and possibly wife of Eadbald of Kent
- Emma of Normandy (c. 985–1052), twice Queen consort of the Kingdom of England by marriage
- Queen Emma of Hawaii (1836–1885), queen to King Kamehameha IV from 1856 to his death in 1863
- Emma of Waldeck and Pyrmont (1858–1934), Queen consort of William III of the Netherlands and Grand Duke of Luxembourg
- Tenille Dashwood (born 1989), Australian professional wrestler better known as Emma in WWE

== Transportation ==
- Emma (ship), any one of several merchant ships of that name
- HMS Queen Emma, a 1939 troopship of the Royal Navy during the Second World War
- USS Emma (1863), a screw steamer
- USS Emma (SP-1223), a patrol boat in non-commissioned service from 1917 to 1918

== Other uses ==
- EMMA (accelerator) or Electron Machine with Many Applications
- EMMA (code coverage tool)
- Emma (play), a 1976 play by Howard Zinn about Emma Goldman
- Emma (satellite)
- 283 Emma, a main-belt asteroid
- Emma-gaala, a Finnish music award
- Electronic Municipal Market Access (EMMA), the official source for municipal securities disclosures and related financial data in the United States
- Espoo Museum of Modern Art (EMMA)
- Ethnic Multicultural Media Academy, an organization that raises awareness of discrimination
- Experiment with MultiMuon Array (EMMA)
- Degtyaryov machine gun or Emma, a Soviet machine gun of 1928
- Emmanuel College, Cambridge or Emma, a constituent college of Cambridge University
- Emma, a keytar instrument used by Lady Gaga on The Monster Ball Tour
- EMMA a fictional artificial intelligence from the video game Persona 5 Strikers

== People with the surname ==
- Brandi Emma (born 1983), American actress and singer-songwriter
- David Emma (born 1969), American retired ice hockey player
- Jaime Emma (1938–2005), Argentine chess player
- Nicolás Emma (born 1981), Argentine politician

== See also ==
- Emma Mærsk, first in the Maersk E-class 11,000-TEU container ships
- List of ships named Emma
- Saint Emma (disambiguation)
- EMA (disambiguation)
- List of storms named Emma
- USS Emma, a list of ships
- Yama (Buddhism) or Enma, Buddhist god of death
