= EMA =

EMA or Ema may refer to:

== Biology and medicine ==
- Anti-Endomysial Antibodies test
- Epithelial membrane antigen
- European Medicines Agency, a European Union agency for the evaluation of medicinal products
- European Medical Association, association representing Medical Doctors in Europe
- Emergency Medicine Australasia, a scholarly journal

== Education ==
- Eastern Military Academy, a defunct school in Connecticut
- Education Maintenance Allowance, a financial scheme for students in Scotland, Wales and Northern Ireland
- Escuela Mexicana Americana, a school in Mexico City

== Engineering, science and technology ==
- Ema (underground car)
- Effective medium approximations, modeling that describes the macroscopic properties of composite materials
- Electromagnetic articulography, a method of measuring the position of parts of the mouth
- Exponential moving average
- Electromechanical actuator

== Government ==
- Emergency Management Agency
- Emergency Management Australia, an agency of the Australian Government
- Energy Market Authority, a regulatory body in Singapore
- Ethiopian Mapping Authority
- Ecosystems Mission Area
- Emergency Mobile Alert, New Zealand's nationwide mobile public warning system
- Euro-Mediterranean Association for Cooperation and Development, a German international co-operation organization

== Media and entertainment ==
- Egmont Manga & Anime, a German manga publishing company
- Ema (film), a 2019 Chilean drama film
- Entertainment Merchants Association, an international trade association
- Environmental Media Association, an American environmental organisation
  - Environmental Media Awards
- European Mahjong Association, an international organization for the interests of Mahjong in Europe
- Mother (2016 Estonian film) (Estonian: Ema), a 2016 Estonian drama film

=== Music ===
- EMA (TV series), Slovenian Eurovision Song Contest selection
- Entertainment Monitoring Africa, a South African record chart
- Eska Music Awards, a Polish awards ceremony
- MTV Europe Music Awards, an award presented by Viacom International Media Networks

== People ==
- Ema Horvath, American actress
- Ema Burgić Bucko (born 1992), Bosnian tennis player
- Ema Derossi-Bjelajac (1926–2020), Croatian politician
- Ema Fujisawa (born 1982), Japanese model and actress
- Ema Klinec (born 1998), Slovenian ski jumper
- Ema Kogure (born 1976), Japanese voice actress
- Ema Kuribayashi (born 1983), Japanese cricketer
- Ema Peter (born 1977), Canadian architectural photographer
- Ema Pukšec (1834–1889), Polish soprano
- Ema Ramusović (born 1995), Montenegrin handball player
- Ema Saikō (1787–1861), Japanese painter, poet, and calligrapher
- Ema Shah (born 1981), Kuwaiti singer, composer, and director
- Ema Kapustová (born 2002), Slovak biathlete
- Tamotsu Ema, Japanese dive bomber pilot
- Ema Maishima (ring name), Japanese professional wrestler
- Ema Tōyama (born 1981), Japanese manga artist
- Ema Twumasi (born 1997), Ghanaian footballer
- Ema Wolf (born 1948), Argentine writer and journalist
- Ema Ryan Yamazaki (born 1989), Japanese-British documentary filmmaker
- Erika M. Anderson (born 1982) (stage name: EMA), American singer and songwriter

== Fictional characters ==
- Sakuraba Ema (桜羽 エマ), a female protagonist of the 2025 video game Magical Girl Witch Trials
- Hinata Ema (朝日奈 絵麻), one of the main characters in the Japanese novel series Brothers Conflict
- Ema Skye (宝月 茜), a character from the Ace Attorney franchise created by Capcom
- Ema Yasuhara (安原 絵麻), from the 2014 TV anime Shirobako
- Ema (character voice: Jordi Mand), of the preschool computer-animated TV series Rob the Robot

== Other uses ==
- IATA code for East Midlands Airport, an airport in England
- Electronic Money Association, a European trade body
- Ema (Shinto), wooden plaques used by Shintō and Buddhist worshippers
- Emmet Monument Association, a mid-nineteenth-century American Irish nationalist group
- Engineers' and Managers' Association, a former British trade union
- Tropical Storm Ema, list of tropical storms in the Pacific Ocean with this name
- Greater rhea (Rhea americana), a flightless bird of South America, also known as ema in Portuguese
- Kemak people, a Timorese ethnic group, also known as Ema

== See also ==
- Emma (disambiguation)
- Europe, the Middle East and Africa (EMEA)
- EMAS (disambiguation)
