= EMAS =

EMAS or Emas may refer to:

== Places ==
- Emas National Park, Brazil
- Emas, Paraíba, Brazil

== Other uses ==
- E.M.A.S., 2003 Malaysian-language album by Siti Nurhaliza
- EMAS (company), an oil and gas industry equipment company
- Emas (Malaysian TV channel)
- Emas bond, a Malaysian financial instrument
- Caloptilia emas, a moth of the family Gracillariidae
- East Midlands Ambulance Service, in England
- Eco-Management and Audit Scheme, an environmental management system
- Edinburgh Multiple Access System, a computer operating system
- EMAS Canada, a medical charity
- Engineered materials arrestor system, designed to mitigate runway excursions
- European Menopause and Andropause Society, a European medical association
- Expressway Monitoring and Advisory System, in Singapore
- MTV Europe Music Awards, a music awards show
- Proton EMAS, a range of concept cars
- Geely Galaxy E5, an electric SUV sold by Proton as the eMas 7 (stylised as e.MAS 7) in Malaysia and select overseas markets

== See also ==
- EMA (disambiguation)
