= Volodymyr Kozyavkin =

Ukrainian physician and scientist (1947–2022)

Hero of Ukraine Volodymyr Kozyavkin
- Володимир Козявкін
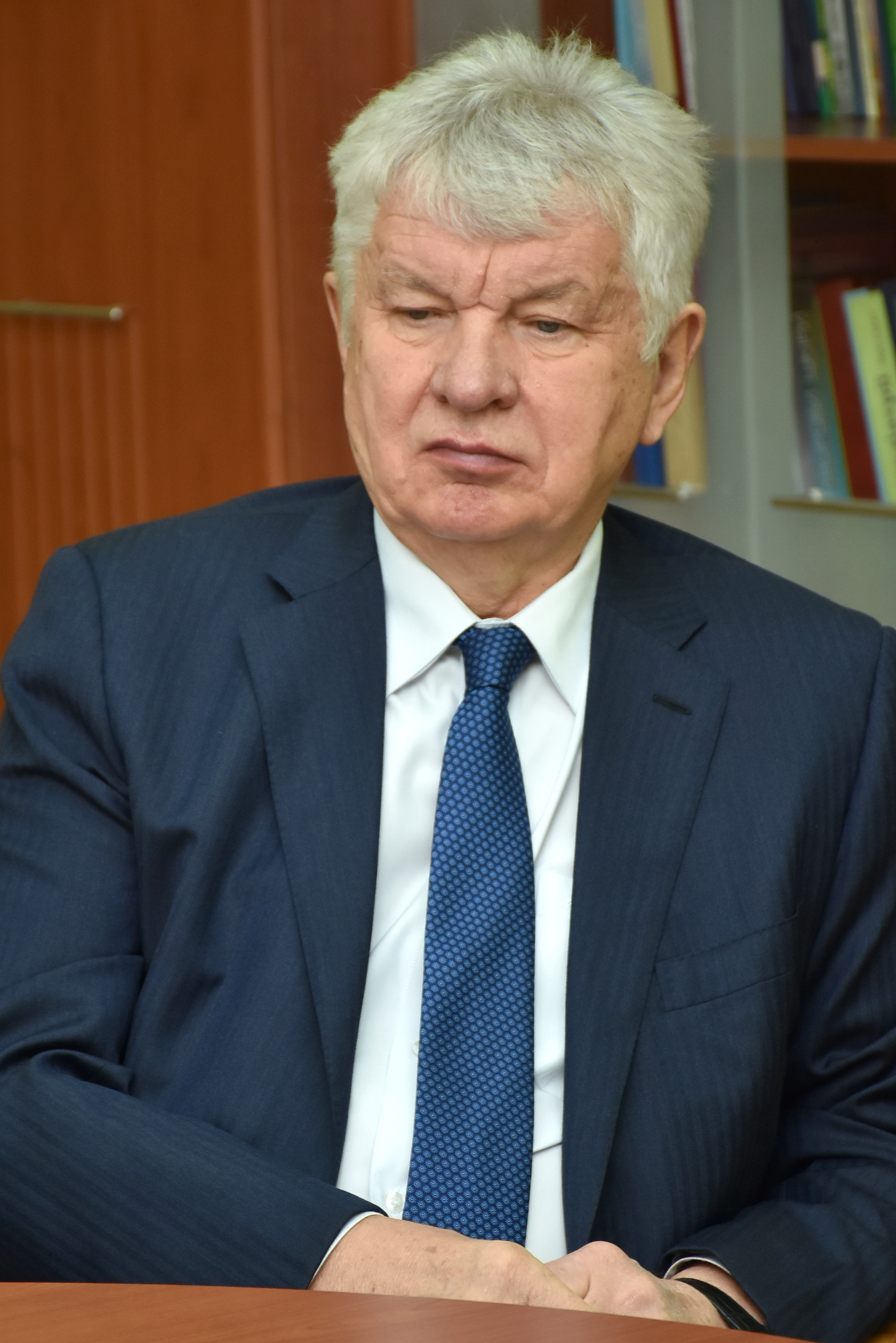
- Kozyavkin in 2017
- Born: 9 June 1947; Ostrozhets, Ukrainian SSR, Soviet Union
- Died: 16 December 2022 (aged 75); Truskavets, Ukraine
- Resting place: Lychakiv Cemetery
- Education: Grodno State Medical University
- Occupations: Physician; scientist

Volodymyr Illich Kozyavkin (Ukrainian: Володимир Ілліч Козявкін; 9 June 1947 – 16 December 2022) was a Ukrainian physician and scientist, Hero of Ukraine (2001). As the medical director of LLC International Rehabilitation Clinic Kozyavkin, he specialized in the fields of neurology and medical rehabilitation.

Kozyavkin's groundbreaking Kozyavkin Method approach of intense neurophysiological therapy is used worldwide to treat individuals with organic nervous system disorders and cerebral palsy. Owing to its efficacy, this rehabilitation approach has garnered widespread worldwide recognition and is legally recognized in Ukraine.

== Early life and education ==
Born on 9 June 1947, in the Ukrainian village of Ostrozhets. He went to No.8 School (Duben Gymnasium No. 2). Kozyavkin received his degree from the Grodno Medical Institute's medical faculty in 1971.

== Medical career ==
Kozyavkin was first employed as a physician at the Brest Psychiatric Hospital and then at the Dubna ambulance station. He then worked in the Moscow departmental clinic of TASS, doing scientific and medical work. He authored two PhD theses: "Structural and functional disorders of cerebral and spinal structures in cerebral palsy and the rehabilitation system of these patients" (1996) and "Manual therapy in the rehabilitation of cerebral palsy patients" (1992).

Kozyavkin has been the Lviv Rehabilitation Center Elita director in March 1990, the Institute of Medical Rehabilitation Problems in 1996, and the International Clinic of Rehabilitation in 2003. He was elected to the post of professor in 1999 in the P.L. Shupyk National Medical Academy of Postgraduate Education's Department of Medical Rehabilitation and Balneology. The Institute of Medical Rehabilitation Problems in Truskavets was established as a branch of this department.

Kozyavkin gave a presentation on intense rehabilitation technology from Ukraine in March 2009 at the European Parliament's headquarters in Brussels during the International Conference on Social Adaptation of Persons with Disabilities. A corresponding member of the National Academy of Medical Sciences (NAMS) since December 2011, and later becoming an academician on 16 September 2021.

=== Kozyavkin Method ===
Kozyavkin adapted manual therapy procedures for children to fit their unique anatomical and physiological aspects based on his experience as a neurologist, manual therapist, and observer of changes in muscle tone in adults following spinal manipulation. When a new strategy was used in the mid-1980s, the outcome was better than expected: individuals with spastic types of cerebral palsy showed less muscular tone and more movement volume, which was welcomed by medical professionals, patients, and the parents of the ill children.

Written by Kozyavkin, the Kozyavkin Method is a technique of intense neurophysiological therapy that has revolutionized the way people with cerebral palsy are treated. Because of its success, the developed rehabilitation method received widespread international acclaim in addition to formal approval in Ukraine. One of the four most successful conservative approaches for cerebral palsy patient rehabilitation was the Kozyavkin Method, according to the 1997 edition of the encyclopedic magazine Kinderorthpedie.

== Death ==
According to the presidium of the NAMS of Ukraine, Kozyavkin died on 16 December 2022, at the age of 75. The Truskavets City Council expressed profound grief over his passing, recognizing it as an irreparable loss not only for Ukraine and Truskavets but also for the global medical community.

== Awards and recognitions ==
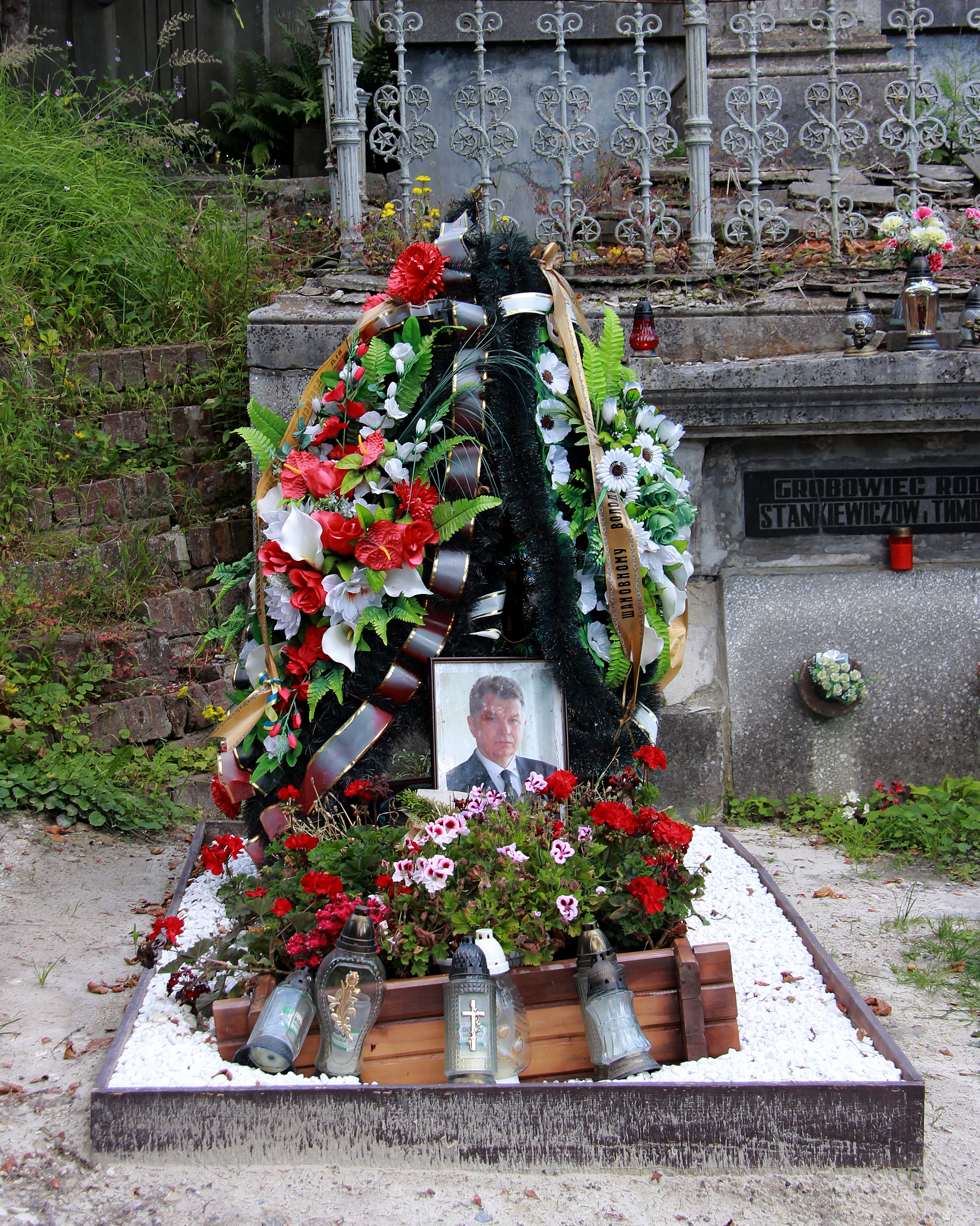
Grave of Kozyavkin in 2023

In August 2001, Kozyavkin received the title of Hero of Ukraine with the Order of the State award from the President of Ukraine for his exceptional dedication to the country's advancement of medical research, creation of radically new approaches to treatment, and reintegration of patients with cerebral palsy. In 2017, Professor Kozyavkin's Method was entered in the register of the European Medical Association (EMA) as the best medical practice.

Kozyavkin has received other awards and recognitions such as:

- Hero of Ukraine Order of the State (21 August 2001)
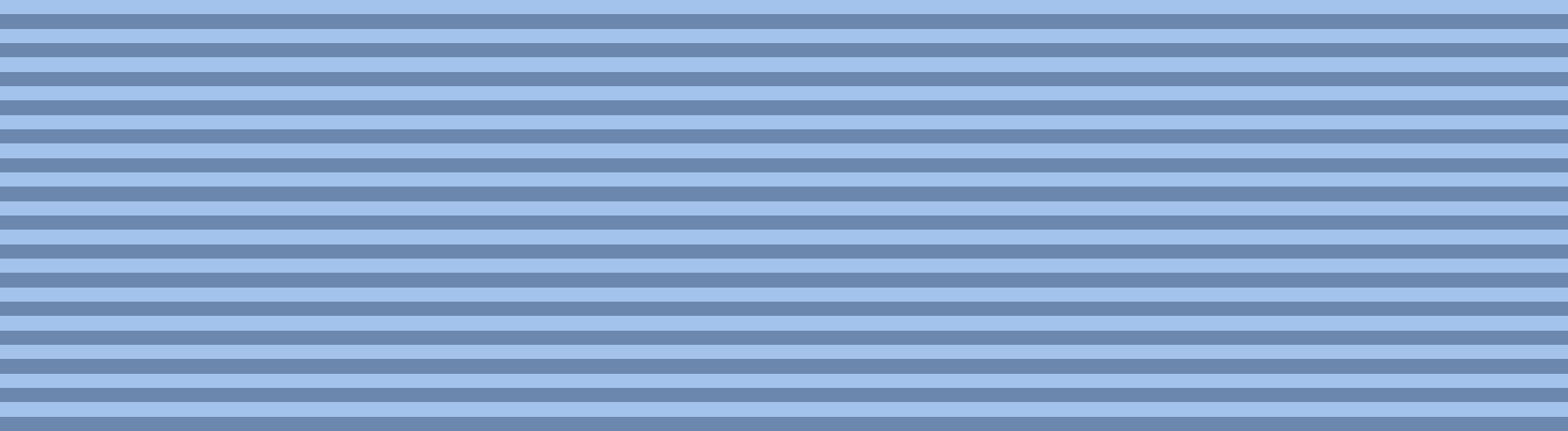
- Order of Prince Yaroslav the Wise Fifth Class (18 August 2006)
- Order of Merit Third Class (13 May 1997)
- 20 Years of Independence of Ukraine Medal (19 August 2011)
- State Prize of Ukraine in the Field of Architecture (26 July 2005)
- State Prize of Ukraine in Science and Technology (1 December 1999)
- Honored Worker of Science and Technology of Ukraine (29 June 1994)
- Honorary Citizen of Kyiv (2006)
- Honorary Citizen of Dubno (25 July 2003)
