= Foster's Log Cabin Court =

- Foster's Log Cabin Courts
- U.S. National Register of Historic Places
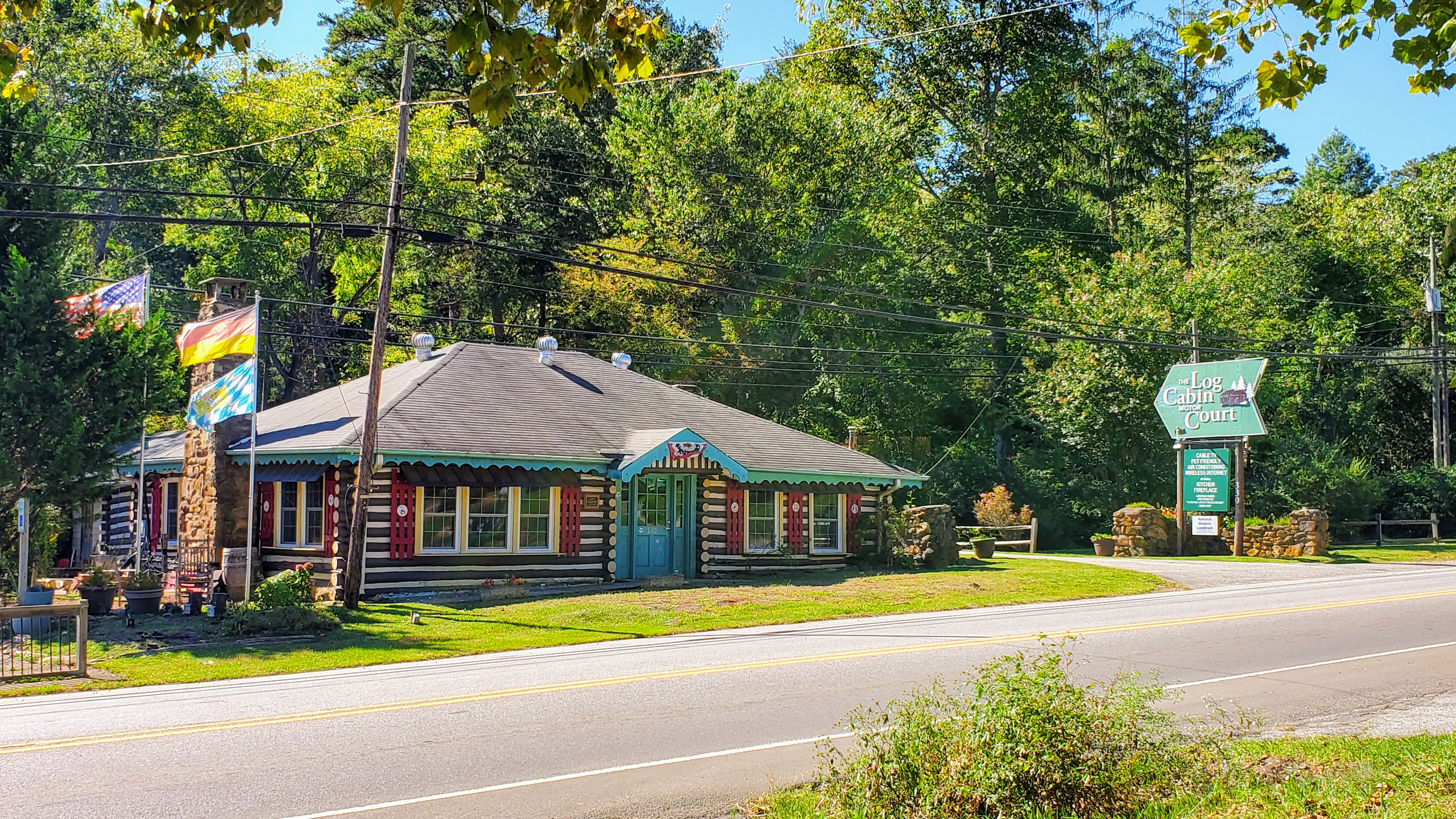
- Front Entrance with sign and Dining Lodge, 2021

- Location within North Carolina Location within the United States
- Location: 330 and 332 Weaverville Rd., Woodfin, North Carolina
- Coordinates: 35°39′38″N 82°34′55″W
- Area: 3 acres (1.2 ha)
- Built: c. 1932
- Architectural style: Rustic Revival
- NRHP reference No.: 100000939
- Added to NRHP: May 1, 2017

Foster's Log Cabin Court (now the Log Cabin Motor Court) is located at 330-332 Weaverville Road in Woodfin, North Carolina, about five miles north of the City of Asheville. One of the first auto-oriented tourism facilities in the Asheville area, it features a number of one and two bedroom Rustic Revival log cabins and a dining lodge. It was placed on the National Register of Historic Places in 2017.

== Historic Background ==
A Buncombe County, North Carolina couple, Zebulon and Audrey Foster, purchased land in the Pine Burr Park area of Woodfin in 1920. They both worked in Asheville, and were looking for a more rural lifestyle for themselves and their young daughter. Initially they lived in a small house on the property, gardened, and had a dairy cow.

The land bordered what became a section of the Dixie Highway, a scenic driving route for tourists from northern states. After a number of people asked to camp on the site, which featured a grove of pine trees and views of the mountains, the Fosters decided to construct some small cabins around 1931. The first seven one-room cabins with porches, built from pine logs, were served by two outhouses. Each cabin rented for $1 per night.

Six more cabins were built in 1932. All the cabins were improved over the next few years, with additions such as bathrooms, brick chimneys, and wood floors. A dining facility was constructed on an adjoining lot in 1937; it operated as a restaurant until 2021. Part of the movie Thunder Road, starring Robert Mitchum, was filmed in one of the cabins in the summer of 1957; it was then called Top-o-the-Hill cabin, and is now known as the Thunder Road cabin.

Audrey Foster operated the Log Cabin Court until she retired in 1970 (Zebulon Foster died in 1941.) It has continued to provide moderately-priced tourist accommodations under subsequent owners.

== National Register of Historic Places Listing ==
Foster's Log Cabin Court was nominated for the National Register in December 2016, and was listed on May 1, 2017. There are twenty-two contributing buildings and three non-contributing buildings in the property listing.

The historic significance of the property was described in the nomination:

As an intact example of twentieth-century automobile-based tourism, Foster’s Log Cabin Court meets National Register Criterion A in the area of Entertainment/Recreation. Foster’s Log Cabin Court also meets Criterion C for architecture as an intact tourist court with Rustic Revival style buildings characterized by saddle-notched pole-log construction. The rustic log construction has appealed to the romantic nature of passing motorists since the court’s inception, offering tourists a welcome opportunity to experience the pioneer heritage of the region. As one of the region’s earliest and best-preserved tourist courts, the buildings of Foster’s Log Cabin Court remain scattered among tall pine trees, and the wooded setting compliments the rustic architecture of the tourist court.

== Gallery ==
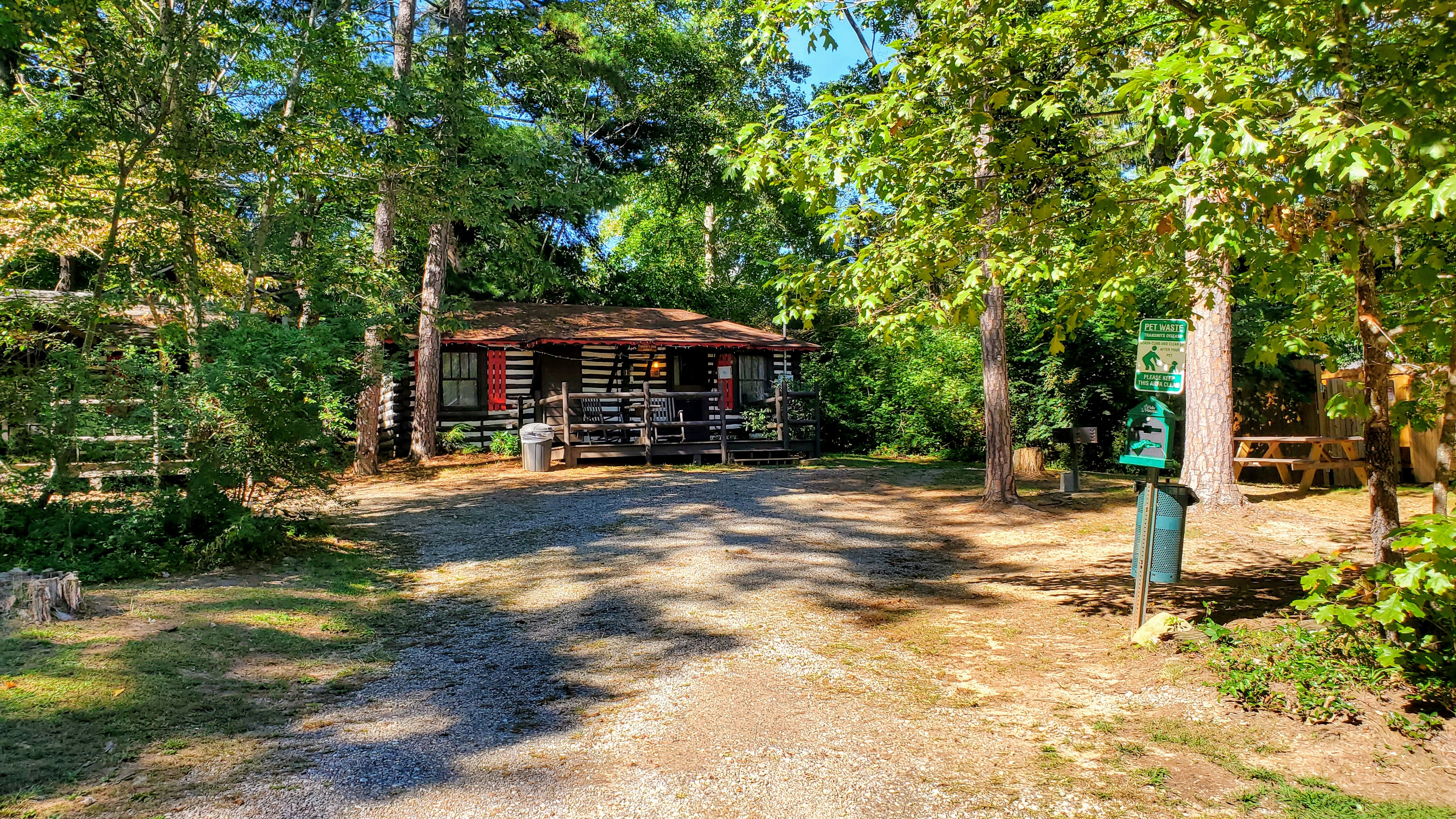
Traveler's Rest Cabin, 2021

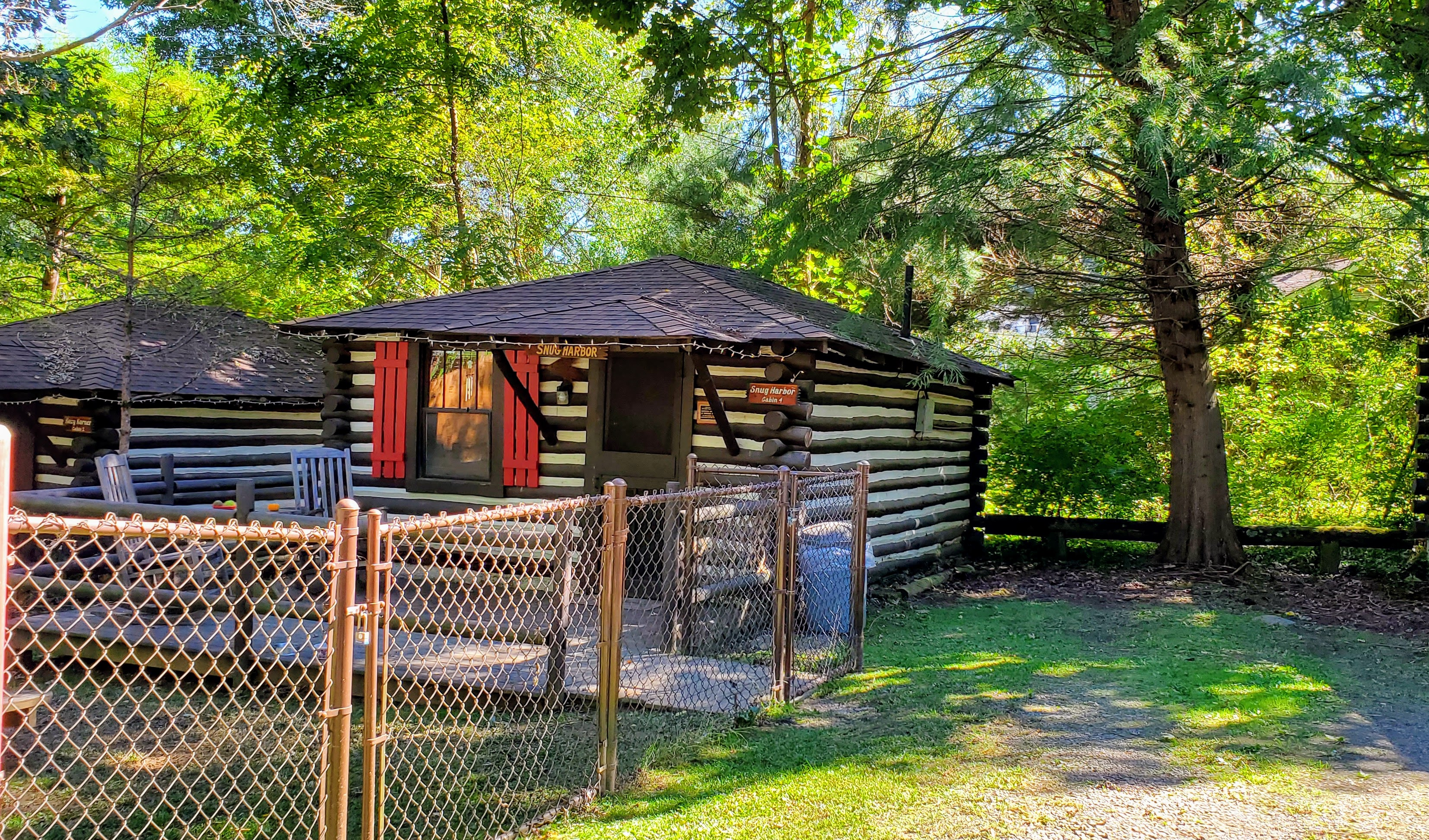
Sung Harbor Cabin, 2021

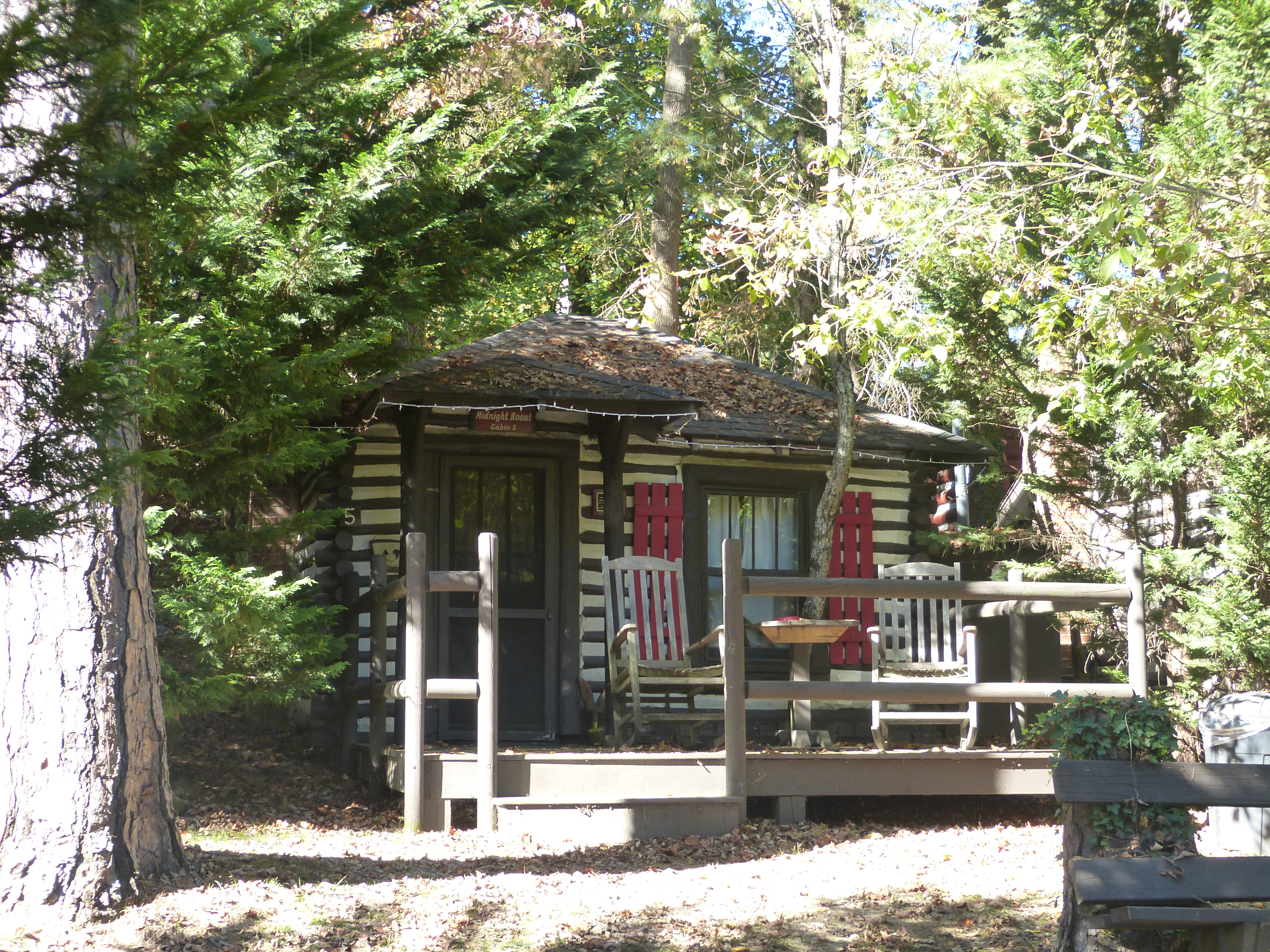
Midnight Roost Cabin, 2020

== See also ==
Articles about the Rustic Revival style in North Carolina:

Log Building Construction in Mecklenburg County From 1920 to 1945: http://landmarkscommission.org/wp-content/uploads/2016/02/Rustic-Revival-Log-Buildings.pdf

PSABC Learns about Homeland Tourist Park & Rustic Revival Log Cabins: https://www.biltmorebeacon.com/news/psabc-learsn-about-homeland-tourist-park-rustic-revival-log-cabins/article_369eb27a-6508-11e9-87e9-d796d6b0ae90.html

Rustic Revival: https://www.ourstate.com/rustic-revival-joe-webb-cabins-highlands-north-carolina/
