= Peter (surname) =

Peter is a surname which is also a common masculine given name (see here). It is derived, via Latin "petra", from the Greek word πέτρος (petros) meaning "stone" or "rock".

== List of people ==
- Aaju Peter (born 1960), Inuk lawyer, activist and clothing designer
- Babett Peter (born 1988), German football (soccer) player
- Daniel Peter (1836–1919), Swiss chocolatier and inventor of milk chocolate
- Ema Peter (born 1977), Canadian architectural photographer
- Franz Peter (1896–1968), Austrian military pilot
- Friedrich Peter (1921–2005), Austrian politician
- Fritz Peter (1899–1949), German mathematician
- Gustav Albert Peter (1853–1937), German botanist
- Henry Peter (born 1957), Swiss lawyer
- John Peter (disambiguation), several people
- Jomo Kenyatta (around 1894–1978), Kenyan leader, who briefly assumed the name John Peter when he converted to Christianity in 1914
- Karene Peter (born 1991), English actress
- Philipp Peter (born 1969), Austrian racing car driver
- Rózsa Péter (1905–1977), Hungarian mathematician
- Sacha Peter, Canadian politician
- Samuel Peter (born 1980), Nigerian heavyweight boxer
- Taelon Peter (born 2002), American basketball player
- Werner Peter (born 1950), East German football (soccer) player
