= Arab Thought Forum (Amman) =

Think tank NGO in Amman, Jordan

The Arab Thought Forum (Arabic: منتدى الفكر العربي) in Amman, Jordan is a non-governmental organization functioning as a think tank, concerned with intellectual, cultural, and developmental issues in the Arab world. It has a particular focus on issues of Arab nationalism and Arab unity. It was established in 1981 by Prince El Hassan Bin Talal.

== See also ==
- Arab Thought Forum, Jerusalem
