= Rights and Humanity =

Rights and Humanity was founded by Professor Julia Häusermann MBE in 1986.

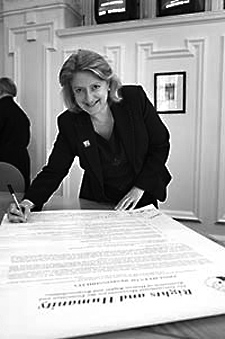
Professor Julia Häusermann, Founder and President of Rights and Humanity

Rights and Humanity has a YouTube channel with several short videos outlining their achievements.

== Achievements ==
Rights and Humanity played a significant role in shaping global policy and practice through the integration of a "human rights approach". It has chosen to focus on various priority issues of the day, including HIV/AIDS, poverty, health, water, and sanitation, participatory democracy, cultural rights, complex emergencies, and the 2008 financial crisis.

== Patrons and officers ==
International Patrons include: the Dalai Lama, Archbishop Emeritus Desmond Tutu, Prince Hassan bin Talal, Dadi Janki Convenor of the Brahma Kumaris World Spiritual University, Sir Sigmund Sternberg
