= Grodno State Medical University =

University in Grodno, Belarus

Coordinates: 53°43′N 23°49′E

- Гродзенскі дзяржаўны медыцынскі універсітэт
- Type: Public
- Established: 1958 (1775 as Medical Academy)
- Rector: Snezhitsky Victor Alexandrovich
- Location: Grodno, Republic of Belarus
- Colours: Belarus
- Website: www.grsmu.by

Grodno State Medical University (educational establishment “Grodno State Medical University” – GrSMU; Belarusian: установа адукацыi Гродзенскі дзяржаўны медыцынскі універсітэт, romanized: ustanova adukacyi Hrodzienski dziaržaŭny miedycynski univiersitet — ГрДМУ) is a university in Grodno, Belarus. It specialises in medicine and medical psychology. It is the oldest medical school in Belarus and is considered, according to some international sources, the best medical university in Belarus.

== History ==
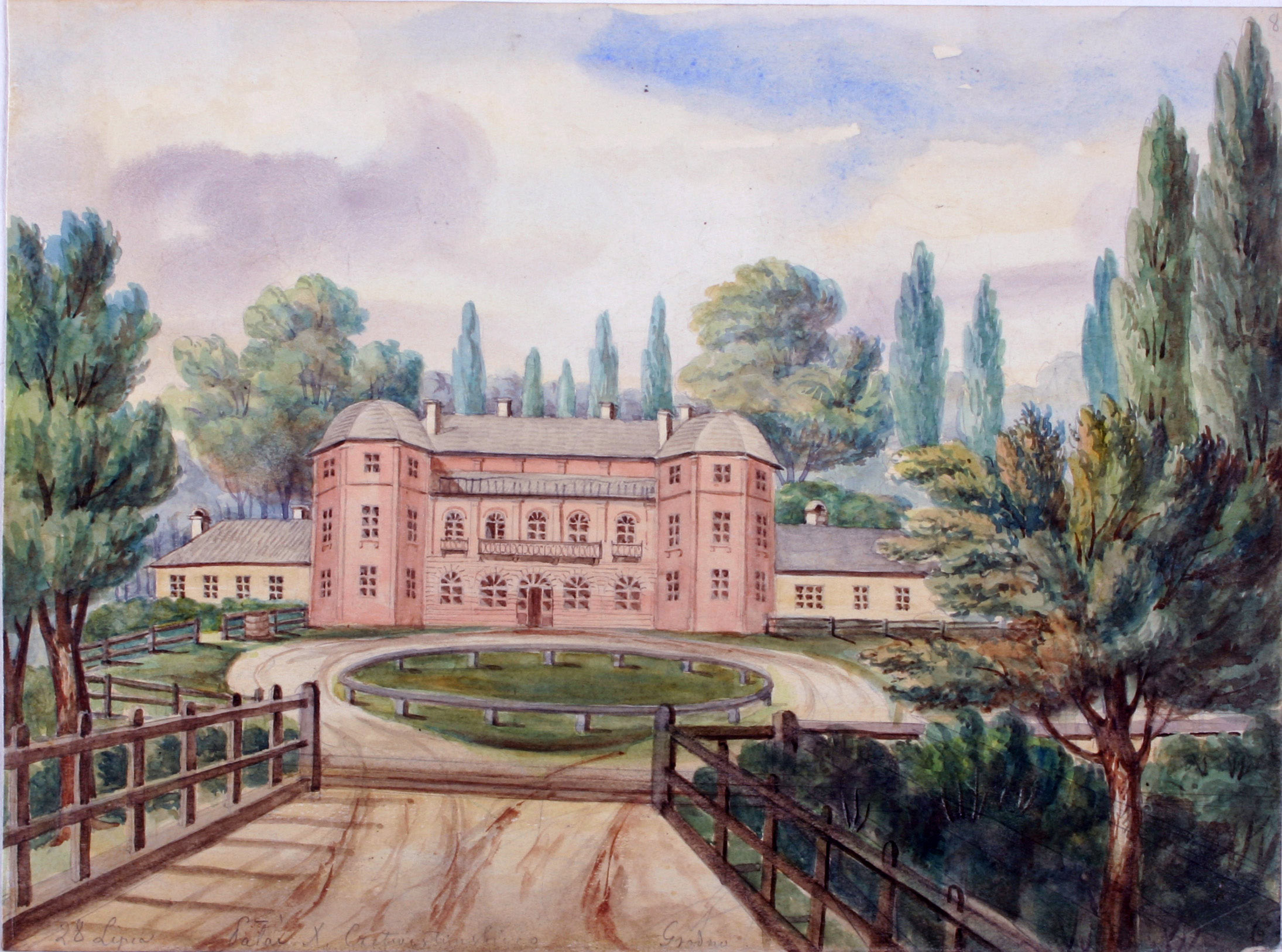
Building of Grodno Medical Academy

GrSMU is the successor of the first medical school in Belarus, the Grodno Medical Academy, established in 1775 by Antoni Tyzenhaus, former mayor of Grodno, to improve the almost nonexistent healthcare system in the city. Jean-Emmanuel Gilibert, French botanist, Freemason and medical doctor, became its first rector. Under his rule were trained first doctors (former illiterate peasants) built a botanical garden and a chemist's shop. The academy in 1781 was reorganized into the Medicine Faculty of Vilna University. The medical school was renovated only during Soviet-era time in 1958. Firstly, it was a small university. Officially got its university status only in 2000.

== Structure ==
Nowadays, the university has 6 faculties:

1. Faculty of General Medicine
2. Faculty of Pediatrics
3. Faculty of Medical Psychology
4. Faculty of Diagnostic Studies
5. Faculty of Advanced Training and Retraining
6. Faculty of International Students

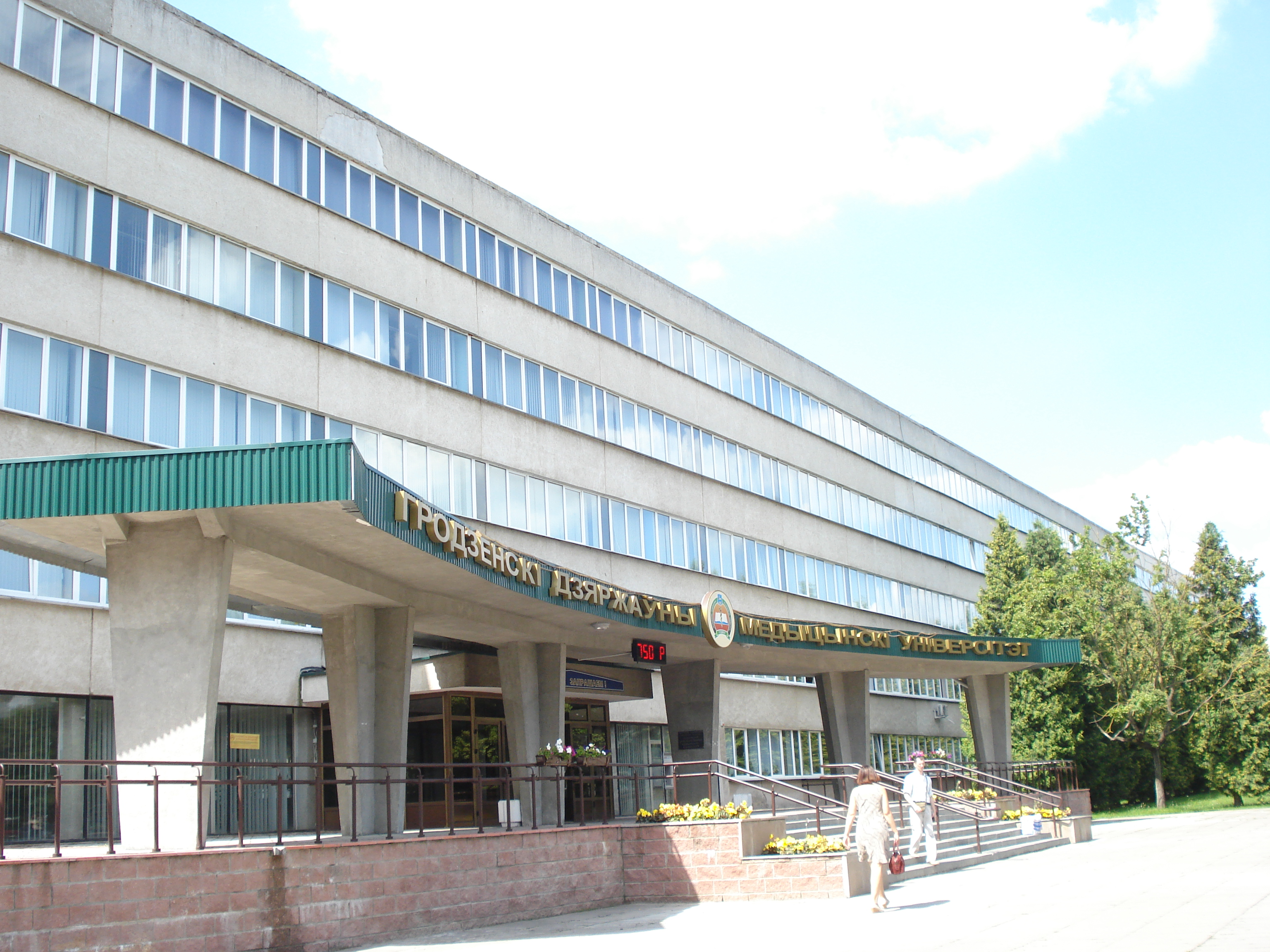
Main building

There are 45 departments of university spread across the city. Main building, completed in 1974, located at Gorkogo st. 80.

== Modern status ==
University does conduct research. It takes part in EU's Trans-European Mobility Programme for University Studies. Also, GrSMU publishes its own medical journal. Grodno State Medical University was recognised as one of the best of its kind in the Commonwealth of Independent States (CIS), according Expert RA. And the best medical university in Belarus.

== Notable people ==
- Volodymyr Kozyavkin (1947–2022)
- Philaret Vakhromeyev (1935–2021)
