= List of ships named Emma =

Several ships have been named Emma:

- Emma (1808 ship) was a merchant vessel launched at Calcutta that participated in the British Invasion of Isle de France, then was a South Seas whaler (1815–1853), a merchantman, and lastly, an Arctic whaler. She was lost in 1864.
- Emma (1813 ship) was launched at Calcutta. From 1814, she made several voyages between India and England under a license from the British East India Company until a hurricane wrecked her on 4 January 1821, at Table Bay, Cape of Good Hope.
- Emma (1824 ship) was part of the First Fleet of South Australia in 1836.
- Emma (1828 ship) capsized shortly after her launch, causing the deaths of as many as 47 of her estimated 200 passengers. She was righted and continued to work along the River Weaver for some years.

== See also ==
- Emma Mærsk, a container ship
- HMS Queen Emma, a troopship of the Royal Navy during the Second World War
- USS Emma – one of two ships by that name
