= The Lookout at Broad Cove Marsh Inverness, Nova Scotia =

The Lookout at Broad Cove Marsh is a residential building in Inverness, Nova Scotia, Canada designed by Omar Gandhi.

It is located on the outskirts of Inverness, Cape Breton Island, Canada. A long and low-profile house, it has a concrete wall anchoring the structure on the uphill side. The angled-down roof protects the house from heavy winds, rain, and snow.

== Architectural style and materials ==
The building was constructed with natural local materials such as wood including cedar, spruce, and birch. The concrete has been left exposed where steel is allowed to weather naturally. There are floor-to-ceiling windows that overlook the ocean. The residence is a single-loaded hallway that is minimally furnished. A 48-foot stretch of millwork anchors the whole corridor.

== Layout ==
In terms of layout, one half of the house consists of an indoor/outdoor great space with rooms for sitting, cooking, and entertaining. This open area is anchored by an 18-foot-long island that serves as both a food prep area and an eating area. Three repeating pod-like modules on the opposite end of the home slide past the ocean-side windows to connect into the hallway, separating the private areas of bedrooms and baths. The pods are lined with white-washed locally sourced spruce boards of larger widths, in contrast to the concrete surface of the foundation (retaining wall and floor slab) and the fine-grain natural finish of the wooden service bars.

The back elevation of the house features a retaining wall with a strip of glass above it that allows for additional natural light, and a piece of the kitchen roof lifts up to allow for more natural light to pass through.
