= Saint Emma =

Saint Emma or Hemma may refer to:

- Saint Hemma of Gurk, c. 980–1045, Austria
- Saint Emma of Lesum or Emma of Stiepel, also known as Hemma and Imma, d. 1038, Bremen, Germany
- Hemma (808–876), queen of Louis the German, is sometimes called Saint Emma

== See also ==
- Emma (disambiguation)
- St. Emma Plantation, former sugar plantation in Louisiana
