= North Carolina Electrical Power Company Electric Generating Plant =

Historic building in North Carolina, US

- U.S. National Register of Historic Places
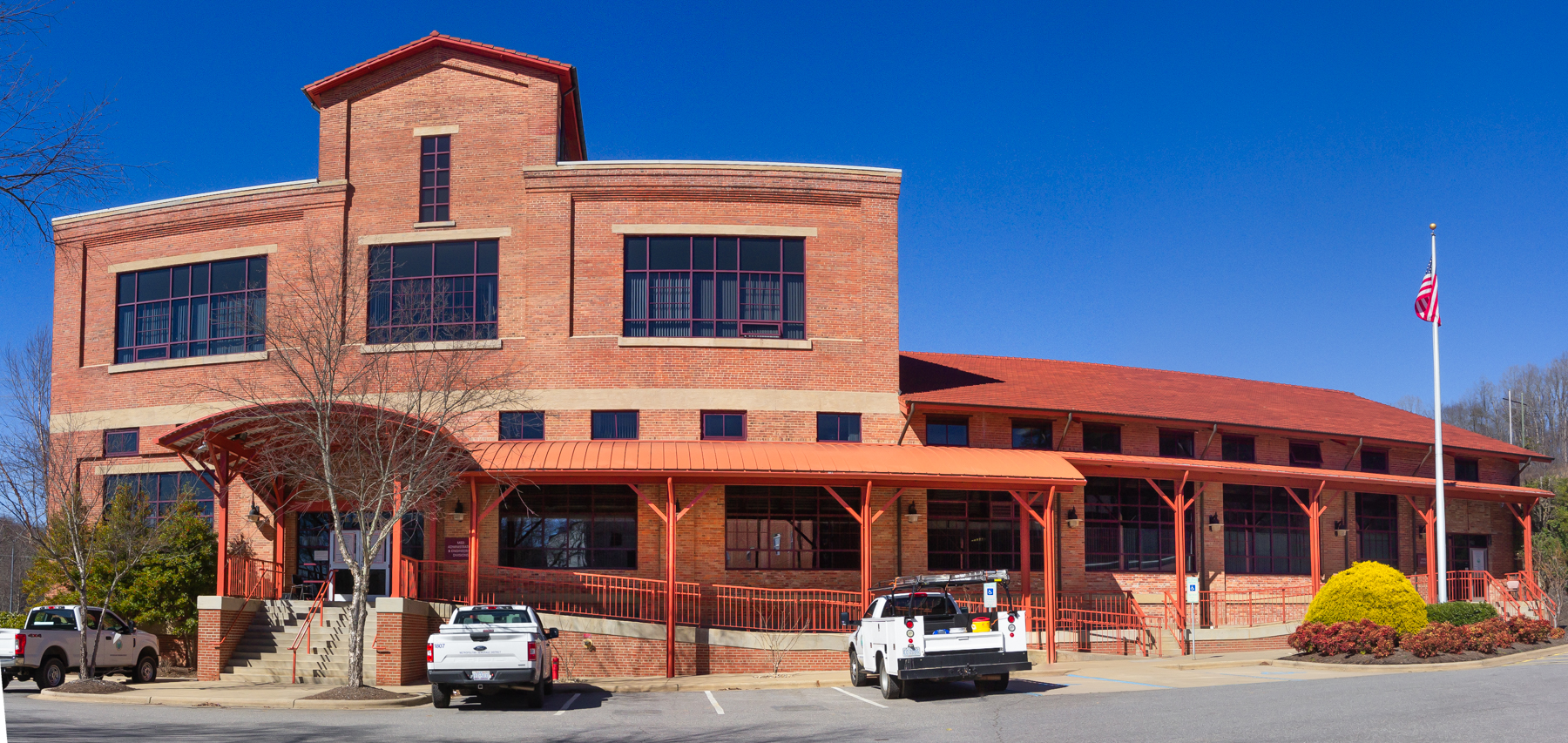

- Location within North Carolina Location within the United States
- Location: 2024 Riverside Dr., Woodfin, North Carolina
- Coordinates: 35°38′25″N 82°35′53″W
- Area: 2 acres (0.81 ha)
- Built: 1916
- Architect: Waddell, Charles E.
- Architectural style: Industrial
- NRHP reference No.: 99000754
- Added to NRHP: June 25, 1999

North Carolina Electrical Power Company Electric Generating Plant, also known as Elk Mountain Steam Generating Plant, is a historic power station located at Woodfin, Buncombe County, North Carolina. It was built in 1916, and is a tall one-story, rectangular brick and concrete building. It measures 78 feet wide and 165 feet long. It features a 250 foot tall original brick smokestack.

It was listed on the National Register of Historic Places in 1999.
