= Euro-Mediterranean-Arab Association =

Euro-Mediterranean-Arab Association (EMA)
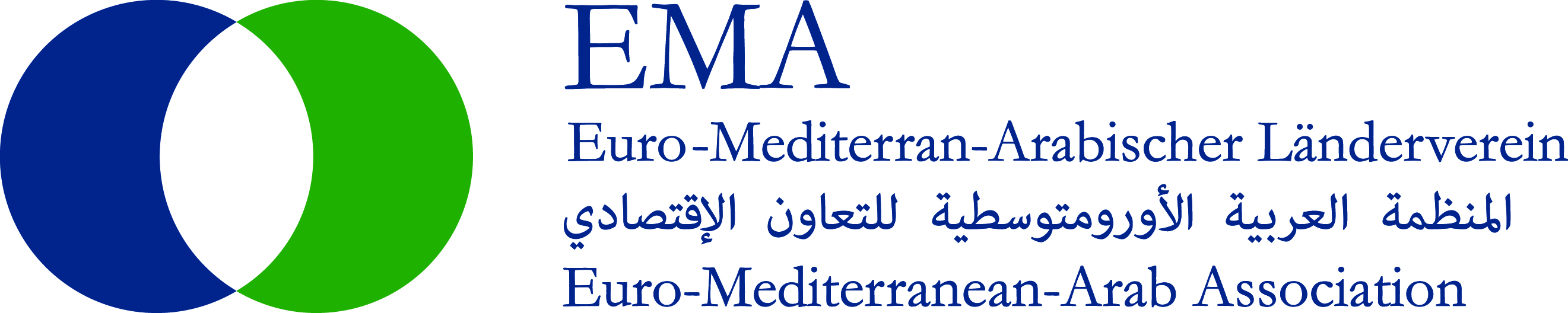
- Founded: 2008
- Type: Non-profit; NGO
- Headquarters: Berlin
- Location(s): Berlin, Germany Hamburg Casablanca Tunis
- Field: Economic development cooperation
- Members: 165
- Secretary General: Clara Gruitrooy
- President: Heike Fölster
- Vice Presidents: Gabriele Groneberg (Vice President); Dr. Abdelmajid Layadi (Vice President)
- Website: https://ema-germany.org/?lang=en

The Euro-Mediterranean-Arab Association (EMA e.V.) is a German non-profit organization that works in the field of development cooperation between Europe, especially Germany, and the countries of the Mediterranean and the Middle East. The association is a politically, religiously and ideologically independent organization. It is based in Berlin, with branches in Hamburg, Casablanca and Tunis. The association aims to further economic development cooperation and political, cultural, and academic exchange between Germany and the countries of Northern Africa, the Middle East, and the Persian Gulf region (EMA region).

== History ==
The EMA was founded in 2008 as the Euro-Mediterranean Association for Cooperation and Development by Dr. Abdelmajid Layadi. In 2014, the association was renamed and has since been known as the Euro-Mediterranean-Arab Association. From 2014 to 2017, the former German president Christian Wulff was the president of the association. In August 2017 he was named Honorary President along with Prince Hassan bin Talal of the Hashemite Kingdom of Jordan who occupied this post since January 2012.

List of presidents

- Ralf Busch (August 2008 - August 2009)
- Horst H. Siedentopf (August 2009 - December 2012)
- Adelheid Sailer-Schuster (January 2013 - August 2014)
- Christian Wulff (August 2014 - August 2017)
- Gabriele Groneberg (August 2017 - August 2021)
- Heike Fölster (since August 2021)

== Aims ==
The primary task and goal of the association is to promote and strengthen economic relations and intercultural dialogue between Europe - and here in particular Germany - and the Mediterranean and Middle East region and between the countries of this region themselves. Of particular importance to the EMA are the topics of female empowerment, green energy, food security, digitalization, and sustainably supply-chain. In general, the association emphasizes the importance of ecological and social sustainability in its projects and activities. The EMA specifically supports German companies in entering the market, but also in expanding their business activities in the countries of the EMA region, focusing on a holistic approach to economic as well as social sustainability: the promotion of water and energy management to protect natural resources, good and responsible corporate governance and know-how transfer, as well as education and training of qualified junior staff, equality, and respect for diversity with regard to society as a whole.

In 2014, the statutes were expanded to include Corporate Social Responsibility (CSR). This serves as an ethical maxim. In the spirit of corporate ethics and social responsibility of developmental and economic associations, EMA sees it as its task to make the principles of The Global Compact formulated by the United Nations, the "Principles for Responsible Investment" (PRI), and the values set out in the so-called Corporate Social Responsibility Conventions binding for its activities. According to its own statements, this is how it lives up to its responsibility to contribute to sustainable development in international cooperation.

To ensure the long-term nature of its partnerships, the EMA attaches particular importance to a deeper understanding of the cultural realities of German and Arab societies. It regularly organizes intercultural trainings to meet this demand and to promote not only economic but also social and cultural exchange.

== Activities ==
The EMA engages in three kinds of activities: Services for its members, international cooperation projects and events.

=== Services for members ===
==== Market Entries & B2B Matchmaking ====
To ensure the success of the specific aim of its members in entering the Mediterranean and Middle Eastern market it offers to match businesses in meetings and matchmaking events to help them to establish long-term relations for strategic partnerships.

==== International Cooperation Projects ====
If a member has an idea for a project in the EMA-Region it can profit from the association's network of political, economic as well as civil society actors to realize its project as an international cooperation.

==== Studies and Market Analysis ====
The EMA offers to do market research and studies for its members. Upon request, these are tailor-made for a specific project and include competitor and stakeholder analysis, facts about the latest developments in a certain field, or new business opportunities.

==== Training Seminars ====
To enable intercultural economic relations EMA organizes intercultural training for professionals and executives. The seminars cover socio-political and economic realities in the respective region or country, knowledge about communication and negotiation practices of Arab business partners as well as practical tips for initiating business. Leaders of the seminars are experts in the respective country, and change their program according to specific needs of the participants.

==== Translations ====
Translation and interpretive services are offered by the Association for its members in the languages Arabic, German, English, and French. This includes certified translations of various kinds of documents, personal interpreter support for communication with authorities, and the revision of translations.

==== Tender Database ====
Another service the association offers its members is information on current tenders in the economy. The database is updated regularly.

==== Events ====
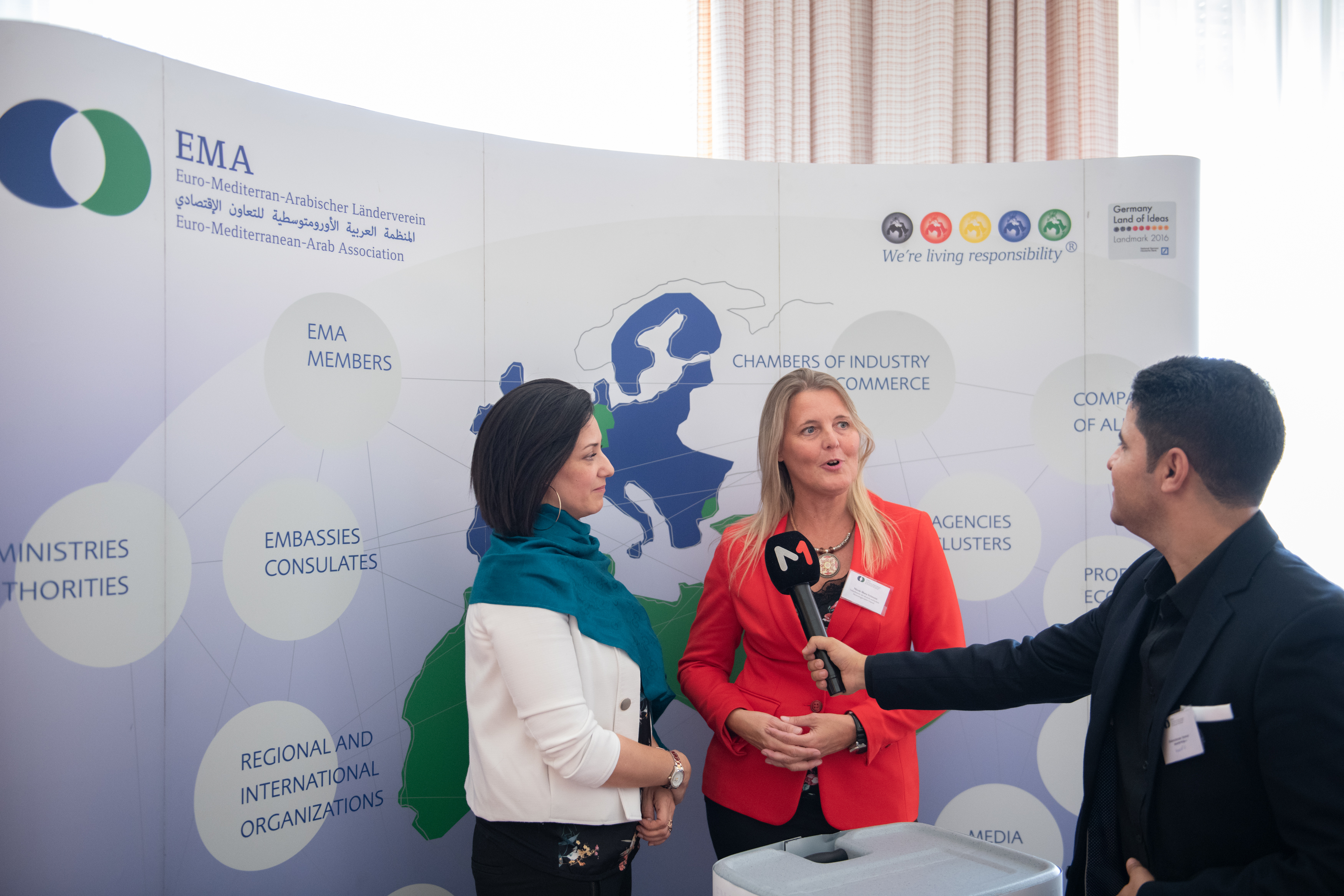
EMA-Event

An integral part of the EMA’s Services are events such as country-specific forums, sector-specific specialist events, or roundtables. These offer the possibility to inform the members about a certain topic and network with decision-makers.

=== International Cooperation Projects ===
==== The German-Arab women's project Ouissal ====
Ouissal (Arabic for "bridge" or "connection") is a German-Arab mentoring project for women entrepreneurs launched by EMA Secretary General Clara Gruitrooy at the request of the Federal Ministry of Family Affairs, Senior Citizens, Women, and Youth and with support from the Federal Foreign Office and the Federal Ministry for Economic Cooperation and Development. It is part of the transformation partnership and was initiated to strengthen the economic and social participation of women. The project is aimed at women from Germany, Tunisia, and Morocco with the goal of sustainable economic empowerment.

==== German-Tunisian cooperation on cross-sectoral digitalization in Tunisia ====
Within the framework of the ParterAfrika project and in partnership with “Club DSI Tunesie” and “VOICE e.V.”, a project was launched in 2021 with the aim to achieving a sustainable digitalization of Tunisian companies and public administration. To achieve this goal, EMA aims at fostering cooperation between companies and training institutions in the field of digitalization within the sector of business and public administration. The project highlights the importance of implementing a strategy that includes a sustainable financing concept as well as a gender component in the cooperation project.

==== Agriculture Morocco ====
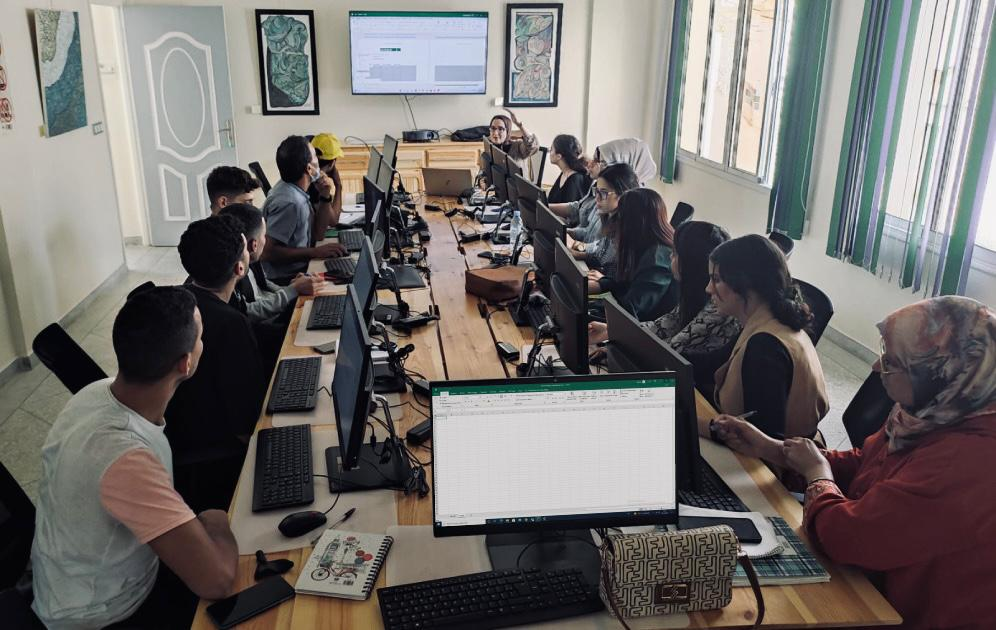
Students at the agribusiness academy

In February 2022, the three-year Moroccan-German project was inaugurated that focuses on the agribusiness sector in Morocco. In the city of Ouezzane, a food academy for training and upgrading the skills of self-entrepreneurs, small managers, and cooperatives in the agro-food processing sector was created. The goal is to support job creation and employment in the northern part of Morocco. EMA emphasizes the importance of projects such as this in a larger framework of efforts to achieve the UN Sustainable Development Goals. The German Ministry for Economic Cooperation and Development (BMZ), the Chamber of Commerce and Industry at Schwerin in Northern Germany, the Chamber of Commerce and Industry of Tangiers-Tetouan-Al Hoceima as well as other associations are partnering the project.

==== Material Purchasing and Supply Chain Management Morocco ====
The goal of this project is to strengthen Moroccan companies in their competitiveness and international orientation through the expansion of skills and structures of Moroccan partner associations. Namely, these are AMCA (on the purchasing side), AMICA (specialized in the automotive sector), and ASMEX (on the export side), which are familiarized with German structures in the sectors of buyers, supply chain managers, and logisticians. Ultimately, Moroccan SMEs will profit from demand-driven intermediaries that are experienced and skilled in internationalization and cross-border supply chain management.

=== Events ===
==== Country Forums ====
EMA e.V. regularly organizes country-specific forums, in which representatives of the countries of the region as well as experts from the fields of economy and politics explain their experiences and share their knowledge. Attending parties have the possibility to present themselves and their project ideas to potential partners and exchange ideas with decision-makers from Germany and the respective country.

==== Regional Forums ====
Regional Forum-Events such as “The Digital Forum”, “The Women Forum” or “The Maghreb Forum” a particular focus on trending issues and specific sectors or regions is stressed to address opportunities for cooperation and development. Representatives from various fields from Germany and the EMA-Region report on their experiences and present their current ideas and plans.

==== Business Delegations ====
The business delegations offered by the EMA to its members serve to inform about the market and to intensify business contacts between German companies and those of the target country. By visiting companies, meetings with important decision-makers on-site, and receiving presentations about the economic and political conditions of the target country, German companies are introduced to the respective market and informed about significant economic and political peculiarities as well as investment opportunities.

==== Expert meetings ====
Through roundtable events, parliamentary evenings, business breakfasts, and B2B discussions, the EMA aims at creating a platform for information and experience exchange in a smaller group.

==== Salon Diplomatique ====
Regularly, events on North Africa and the Middle East are held with diplomatic representatives to shed light on the different perspectives of the EMA countries. These events aim at stimulating new investments by German SMEs and exchange between important leaders.

==== Receptions ====
According to the EMA website, Receptions serve the purpose to generate, capture, process and implement ideas by bringing together the people of SMEs and understanding them as a corporate asset for innovation and growth.

== Publications ==
Regularly, EMA publishes country profiles that inform about the political and economic developments as well as cultural aspects in the respective countries. They are specifically targeted at issues of interest for SMEs and underlie a strict quality check. Strengths and weaknesses are not only described but critically assessed.

The EMA regularly published the magazine "Mediterranes" which deals with recent developments in relevant industrial sectors such as water, environmental engineering, logistics, or trade, or analyses politics and diplomacy in the region. A wide variety of authors from fields such as science, business and politics are included to maximize readership.

== Members ==
The Euro-Mediterranean-Arab Association has 165 Members. Moreover, the EMA has a number of cooperation agreements with institutions in the EMA region and Germany, among them sequa gGmbH, Bundesministerium für Wirtschaft und Klimaschutz (BMWK), Bundesministerium für wirtschaftliche Zusammenarbeit und Entwicklung (BMZ), Agentur für Wirtschaft und Entwicklung (AWE), many embassies of the countries of the EMA-Region, Chambers of Industry and Commerce in partnering countries and many others. Additionally, it engages in mutual membership with Forliance GmbH, B.A.U.M e.V. and Bundesverband Materialwirtschaft, Einkauf und Logistik e.V. (BME).

== Board of directors ==
- President: Heike Fölster
- Honorary Presidents: Member of the Royal Jordanian Family, Majlis El Hassan, Hashemite Kingdom of Jordan and Mr. Christian Wulff, Former president of the Federal Republic of Germany
- Vice Presidents: Dr. Abdelmajid Layadi and Gabriele Groneberg
- Secretary General: Clara Gruitrooy
- Treasurer: Dr. Stephan Jäger
