= EMAS Canada =

EMAS CANADA is a Christian interdenominational non-governmental organization (NGO) providing charitable medical and dental care to under-serviced areas throughout the world.

EMAS was founded in 1948, the EMAS CANADA national office is located in Burlington, Ontario.

EMAS supports local healthcare endeavours/initiatives and sends medical, surgical and dental teams of healthcare professionals to assist in under-serviced areas overseas.
