= Ema Peter =

Canadian architectural photographer (born 1977)

- Born: October 19, 1977 (age 48); Sofia, Bulgaria
- Occupation: Architectural photographer
- Website: emapeter.com

Ema Peter (born October 19, 1977) is a Canadian architectural photographer. Based in Vancouver, British Columbia, Canada, she is known for taking a photojournalist approach to capture the relationship between built forms, light and people who live and work within them. She has photographed buildings and interiors Internationally for architects such as Omar Gandhi, Bjarke Ingels Group, Kengo Kuma, Kohn Pedersen Fox, AECOM, Luis Vidal and many more.

She studied in National Academy of Theatre and Film Arts in Sofia, Bulgaria.

She was listed as the Top 5 Architectural Photography studios in the world 2021 by Architizer. She was included in the article "100 most inspiring architectural photographers in the world" by the Loop Design Awards and her story had been featured in articles on CBC News, Forbes Bulgaria, Svobodna Evropa, Madame Architect, Vancouver Sun, and Nova TV News.

Her work has been extensively featured in Western Living magazine.

== Awards ==
- 2018 Architizer A+ Awards, jury and public vote in Architecture + Photography category
- 2019 Canadian Architect magazine, inaugural Photo Award of Excellence
- 2020 Créateurs Design Awards, inaugural award for Project Photography
- 2021 Dezeen Architectural Photograph of the Year
- 2021 Production Paradise Award, Architecture & Interiors winner
- 2022 Architizer A+ Awards, public vote in Architecture+Photography Category
- 2023 Créateurs Design Awards for Best Project Photography

== Exhibitions ==
- West Vancouver Art Museum, The Decisive Moment: Ema Peter
- THE PACIFIC GALLERY, Ema Peter "In the moment"
