= Emma, North Carolina =

- Census-designated place
- Location within North Carolina Location within the United States
- Coordinates: 35°36′07″N 82°35′45″W
- Country: United States
- State: North Carolina
- County: Buncombe

Area
  - Total: 1.09 sq mi (2.82 km^{2})
  - Land: 1.09 sq mi (2.82 km^{2})
  - Water: 0 sq mi (0.00 km^{2})
- Elevation: 2,179 ft (664 m)

Population (2020)
  - Total: 2,174
  - Density: 2,000/sq mi (772/km^{2})
- Time zone: UTC-5 (Eastern (EST))
  - Summer (DST): UTC-4 (EDT)
- ZIP Code: 28806 (Asheville)
- Area code: 828
- FIPS code: 37-21260
- GNIS feature ID: 2812778

Emma is an unincorporated community and census-designated place (CDP) in Buncombe County, North Carolina, United States. It was first listed as a CDP in the 2020 census with a population of 2,174.

The community is in central Buncombe County, bordered to the east and south by the city of Asheville, the county seat, and to the north by Woodfin.

== Demographics ==
Historical population
Census	Pop.	Note	%±
2020	2,174		—
U.S. Decennial Census; 2020

=== 2020 census ===
As of the 2020 census, Emma had a population of 2,174. The median age was 35.4 years. 24.6% of residents were under the age of 18 and 10.9% of residents were 65 years of age or older. For every 100 females there were 96.2 males, and for every 100 females age 18 and over there were 97.5 males age 18 and over.

100.0% of residents lived in urban areas, while 0.0% lived in rural areas.

There were 815 households in Emma, of which 34.5% had children under the age of 18 living in them. Of all households, 36.9% were married-couple households, 24.3% were households with a male householder and no spouse or partner present, and 30.7% were households with a female householder and no spouse or partner present. About 30.3% of all households were made up of individuals and 11.4% had someone living alone who was 65 years of age or older.

There were 872 housing units, of which 6.5% were vacant. The homeowner vacancy rate was 0.0% and the rental vacancy rate was 3.9%.

Emma CDP, North Carolina - Demographic Profile (NH = Non-Hispanic)
Race / Ethnicity	Pop 2020	% 2020
White alone (NH)	980	45.08%
Black or African American alone (NH)	116	5.34%
Native American or Alaska Native alone (NH)	12	0.55%
Asian alone (NH)	3	0.14%
Pacific Islander alone (NH)	0	0.00%
Some Other Race alone (NH)	7	0.32%
Mixed Race/Multi-Racial (NH)	65	2.99%
Hispanic or Latino (any race)	991	45.58%
Total	2,174	100.00%

Note: the US Census treats Hispanic/Latino as an ethnic category. This table excludes Latinos from the racial categories and assigns them to a separate category. Hispanics/Latinos can be of any race.
