= List of storms named Ema =

The name Ema has been used for two tropical cyclones in the Central Pacific Ocean.

- Tropical Storm Ema (1982) – never threatened land.
- Tropical Storm Ema (2019) – did not affect land.
