= Omar Gandhi =

Canadian architectural firm

Omar Gandhi Architect is a Canadian architectural firm established in 2010, with two small studios located in Halifax, Nova Scotia and Toronto, Ontario. The firm is known for its work blending contemporary architectural style with rural vernacular influences, and for sensitivity to the natural landscape of Canada’s Atlantic coast, where the majority of the work is found.

They are viewed as one of Canada's notable young architects. The firm has received accolades for its contemporary Maritime architecture. Omar Gandhi Architect has received the Professional Prix de Rome in Architecture from the Canada Council for the Arts in 2014, a nomination for the Mies Crown Hall Americas Prize (MCHAP) in 2016 and a Governor General’s Medal in Architecture for Rabbit Snare Gorge in 2018.

== History ==
Omar Gandhi, the founder of Omar Gandhi Architect is a Canadian architect currently living and working in Halifax and Toronto. He originally grew up in Brampton, a Toronto suburb, and studied in a Regional Arts program at Mayfield Secondary School in Caledon, located north of Brampton. Later in his academic years, he earned his undergraduate degrees in the Architectural Studies Program at University of Toronto and at Dalhousie University. He continued his studies at Dalhousie University where he earned his master's degree in 2015 and taught as a sessional instructor at the School of Architecture and Planning at Dalhousie. His teaching career continued at the Yale School of Architecture in architectural design as Louis I. Kahn visiting assistant professor for a semester in the 2018–2019 academic year. Post graduation, he started his professional career at KPMB Architects and Young + Wright Architects back in Toronto. It is during his time with Yonge + Wright Architects where he became familiar with wood frame construction and single-family residential projects. He returned to Halifax to work at MacKay-Lyons Sweetapple (MLS), who is considered one of Gandhi's inspirations for his modest Maritime architecture practice. Other inspirations include Todd Saunders from Newfoundland and Acre Architects from New Brunswick.

In 2010, after being unexpectedly laid off from his previous job, he established his own small practice in Halifax, called Omar Gandhi Architect. His practice was officially registered in 2012, and he opened his second office in Toronto in 2016 to expand his practice into a larger urban setting. Since then, the scope of work has broadened: the Halifax studio focuses more on residential projects, whereas the Toronto office deals with mixed-use projects in a more urban environment.

== Architectural style ==
Omar Gandhi Architect's projects are known for their modern vernacular architecture with clear forms and minimal material palettes. The inspiration for all of the projects originates from their site, relating back to their origin while adapting for the future. Their distinctive architectural style echoes the typical Nova Scotia barn design, with 45 degree black gabled roofs and elongated forms. A thoughtful approach is taken to the projects' natural surroundings through research to understand the narrative of the site, topography, environmental conditions, and other site qualities, in order to enrich the simple barn geometries. These considerations are reflected in an innovative use of materials, craftsmanship, and built scale and form. Although the firm practices a traditional “vernacular” architecture, it still uses modern technologies like 3D printing and digital fabrication in tandem with scale modelling with physical materials.

== Notable projects ==
=== Moore Studio (2012) ===
Moore Studio is a retired artist couple's private residential project located in Nova Scotia, Canada constructed in 2012. The 1,500 square foot house is situated in a dense forest in Hubbards. The modern home represents Omar Gandhi's modern take on the gable structures in the Maritime landscape. The typical archetypal form, found in Nova Scotia, is reconfigured into an elongated barn with a 45-degree gabled, standing-seam metal roof and vertical white cedar siding. This project well-characterizes Omar Gandhi Architect's fondness for primary form and natural materials that relate back to their surroundings. It focuses on designing with "extremely raw" materials such as re-purposed steel grating, exposed weather softwood, aluminum roofing and concrete floors. The simple materials and forms with industrial characteristics are enhanced by maximized open spaces filled with natural daylight.

=== Float (2015) ===
Float is a private residential project nominated for the Mies Crown Hall Americas Prize. The project connects to the rugged granite landscape of Purcell's Cove in Nova Scotia. The irregular building profiles mimic the adjacent uneven bedrock surfaces, while the grey-washed wood cladding on the exterior emulates the colors of the surrounding environment. The building forms follow the natural topography of Purcell's Cove, engaging with the varying contours on site. The thoughtful openings and use of building orientation maximize natural light and views. This project demonstrates Gandhi's ability to understand and adapt a new building to an existing site in a way that further accentuates the natural characteristics and conditions of the site.

=== Rabbit Snare Gorge (2015) ===
Rabbit Snare Gorge is a Governor General's Medal winning residential project on a Nova Scotia Island in Cape Breton, completed in collaboration with Design Base 8. In 2015, the 43-foot-tall project on a 47-acre forest was completed with a final cost of $450,000. The name Rabbit Snare Gorge comes from combining the site's natural features of gorges and the site's history of the prior owners snaring rabbits on site, because farming was not feasible due to the extreme topography of gorges. The isolated cabin is located on top of a hill overlooking the coastline of rural Cape Breton and its surrounding dense woodland, in order to maximize the site's vantage points. The project exhibits Omar Gandhi's classic gabled roof structure and use of natural materials, which in this project includes a local wood exterior of eastern white cedar and corten steel exterior windbreak entrance.

== Projects ==
=== Public projects ===
- Cabot Links Villas in Inverness, Cape Breton, Nova Scotia (2015)
- Lady Marmalade in Toronto, Ontario (2019)
- rchmnd in Halifax, Nova Scotia (2017)

=== Private projects ===
- Treow Brycg in Kingsburg, Canada (2018)
- Sluice Point in Yarmouth, Nova Scotia (2017)
- Rabbit Snare Gorge in Cape Breton Highlands, Nova Scotia (2015)
- The Lookout at Broad Cove Marsh in Inverness, Nova Scotia (2015)
- Teph Inlet in Chester, Nova Scotia (2018)
- Syncline in Halifax, Nova Scotia (2017)
- Float in Halifax, Nova Scotia (2015)
- Black Gables in Louisdale, Cape Breton, Nova Scotia (2014)
- Shantih in Hunts Point, Nova Scotia (2012)
- Moore Studio in Hubbards, Nova Scotia (2012)
- Harbour Heights in Inverness, Nova Scotia (2014)
- Black Gables in Louisdale, Cape Breton, Nova Scotia (2011)

== Awards ==
- 2018 Governor General’s Medal in Architecture for Rabbit Snare Gorge
- 2016 Architectural League Emerging Voices
- 2014 Professional Prix de Rome prize, Canada Council for the Arts of $50,000 prize
- 2013 Lieutenant Governor's Award for Architecture for Black Gables
- 2012 Lieutenant Governor's Award for Architecture for Shantih
