= Emas bond =

An Emas bond or sukuk (Islamic bond) is a non-Ringgit denominated bond or sukuk issued out of Malaysia. "Emas" is the Malay word for gold which symbolizes universal value and security. The government of Malaysia issued a US$1.25 billion Emas Sukuk in 2010, one of the largest sovereign sukuk ever to be issued.
