= F. W. Kenyon =

New Zealand writer

Frank Wilson Kenyon (6 July 1912 – 6 February 1989) was a New Zealand novelist.

== Biography ==
Frank Wilson Kenyon spent his childhood in Lancashire, England, until his family emigrated to New Zealand when he was twelve years old. There, his father ran a grocery shop and Kenyon started to discover some of the writers who would later influence his own work, including Dickens, Maupassant, Somerset Maugham and H.G. Wells. After leaving school, he worked in a department store before moving to London for two years in his early twenties to develop a writing career. He wrote many historical novels, particularly about famous women in history.

== Published works ==
- The Emperor's Lady (1952)
- Royal Merry-Go-Round (1954)
- Emma (1955)
- Marie Antoinette (1956)
- Mary of Scotland or Legacy of Hate (1957)
- Never a Saint (1958)
- The Naked Sword : The Story of Lucrezia Borgia (1968)
- The Duke's Mistress (1969)
- My Brother Napoleon (1971)
- Passionate rebel: The story of Hector Berlioz (1972)
- Shadow of the Corsican (1973)
- The golden years: The life and loves of Percy Bysshe Shelley (1974)
- Henry VIII's Secret Daughter : The tragedy of Lady Jane Grey (1974)
