= Woodfin, North Carolina =

- Town
- Flag Seal

- Location in Buncombe County and the state of North Carolina
- Coordinates: 35°38′44″N 82°35′29″W
- Country: United States
- State: North Carolina
- County: Buncombe

Government
  - Type: Mayor-council
  - Mayor: Jim McAllister

Area
  - Total: 9.57 sq mi (24.78 km^{2})
  - Land: 9.19 sq mi (23.80 km^{2})
  - Water: 0.37 sq mi (0.97 km^{2})
- Elevation: 2,123 ft (647 m)

Population (2020)
  - Total: 7,936
  - Density: 863.5/sq mi (333.39/km^{2})
- Time zone: UTC-5 (Eastern (EST))
  - Summer (DST): UTC-4 (EDT)
- Zip Codes: 28804, 28806
- FIPS code: 37-75280
- GNIS feature ID: 2406909
- Website: www.woodfin-nc.gov

Woodfin is a town in Buncombe County, North Carolina, United States. As of the 2020 census, Woodfin had a population of 7,936. It is part of the Asheville Metropolitan Statistical Area. The town is named for Nicholas Washington Woodfin, a renowned lawyer and statesman of early North Carolina, under whom Governor Zebulon Vance clerked as an attorney. Woodfin is the only municipality bearing the name Woodfin in the United States. The town was incorporated in 1971, although the community itself dates back to at least the mid-19th century.

== History ==
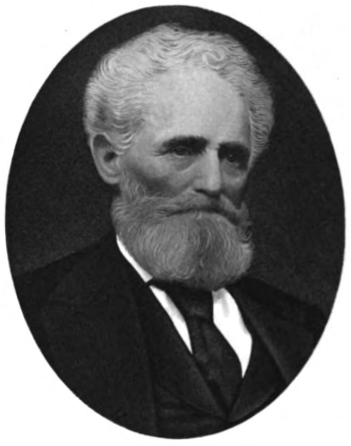
Nicholas Washington Woodfin

The town's history is closely tied to manufacturing. Much of the remaining early housing stock is characteristic of early 20th century mill villages. Many neighborhoods within the community bear names tied to the industry, such as "Martel Village" and "Company Bottom". The decline of American industry in the 1970s and '80s brought a decline to the economy of Woodfin as well. The loss of many manufacturing jobs led to a decline in population and property values. Starting in the 1990s, however, the town has experienced new residential growth, due primarily to the influx of new residents to western North Carolina. Woodfin's economy today is a mix of large- and small-scale manufacturing, combined with a variety of residential and commercial districts. It is the 115th largest municipality in the state.

North Carolina Electrical Power Company Electric Generating Plant was listed on the National Register of Historic Places in 1999.

== Geography ==
Woodfin is located in central Buncombe County, bordering the north side of the city of Asheville, and the unincorporated neighborhood of Emma lies to the southwest.

According to the U.S. Census Bureau, the town of Woodfin has a total area of 9.2 square miles (23.8 km^{2}), of which 8.8 square miles (22.8 km^{2}) is land and 0.42 square miles (1.1 km^{2}), or 4.47%, is water. The French Broad River flows through the western part of the town.

== Demographics ==
Historical population
Census	Pop.	Note	%±
1980	3,260		—
1990	2,736		−16.1%
2000	3,162		15.6%
2010	6,123		93.6%
2020	7,936		29.6%
2025 (est.)	8,229	▲	3.7%
U.S. Decennial Census

=== 2020 census ===
Woodfin racial composition
Race	Number	Percentage
White (non-Hispanic)	6,239	78.62%
Black or African American (non-Hispanic)	415	5.23%
Native American	29	0.37%
Asian	137	1.73%
Pacific Islander	10	0.13%
Other/Mixed	389	4.9%
Hispanic or Latino	717	9.03%

As of the 2020 census, Woodfin had a population of 7,936. The median age was 40.6 years. 14.6% of residents were under the age of 18 and 18.6% were 65 years of age or older. For every 100 females, there were 111.7 males, and for every 100 females age 18 and over, there were 112.3 males.

88.4% of residents lived in urban areas, while 11.6% lived in rural areas.

There were 3,246 households and 1,390 families in Woodfin, and 21.2% of households had children under the age of 18 living in them. Of all households, 36.4% were married-couple households, 23.1% were households with a male householder and no spouse or partner present, and 29.7% were households with a female householder and no spouse or partner present. About 33.7% of all households were made up of individuals, and 12.1% had someone living alone who was 65 years of age or older.

There were 3,689 housing units, of which 12.0% were vacant. The homeowner vacancy rate was 1.7% and the rental vacancy rate was 7.6%.

=== 2000 census ===
As of the census of 2000, there were 3,162 people, 1,394 households, and 769 families residing in the town. The population density was 905.2 inhabitants per square mile (349.5/km^{2}). There were 1,521 housing units at an average density of 435.4 per square mile (168.1/km^{2}). The racial makeup of the town was 92.66% White, 1.96% African American, 0.35% Native American, 0.41% Asian, 3.29% from other races, and 1.33% from two or more races. Hispanic or Latino of any race were 6.70% of the population.

There were 1,394 households, out of which 22.5% had children under the age of 18 living with them, 37.5% were married couples living together, 12.7% had a female householder with no husband present, and 44.8% were non-families. 35.2% of all households were made up of individuals, and 12.9% had someone living alone who was 65 years of age or older. The average household size was 2.19 and the average family size was 2.84.

In the town, the population was spread out, with 19.2% under the age of 18, 10.9% from 18 to 24, 30.5% from 25 to 44, 21.1% from 45 to 64, and 18.3% who were 65 years of age or older. The median age was 37 years. For every 100 females, there were 88.7 males. For every 100 females age 18 and over, there were 87.7 males.

The median income for a household in the town was $27,525, and the median income for a family was $30,909. Males had a median income of $22,351 versus $23,176 for females. The per capita income for the town was $17,408. Roughly 14.6% of families and 21.5% of the population were below the poverty line, including 37.1% of those under age 18 and 15.4% of those age 65 or over.

== Government ==
The town is governed by a seven-member board consisting of a mayor and six council members. The council members serve four-year terms with staggered elections of three every two years. The board meets at 5:00 PM on the third Tuesday of every month, held at the Woodfin Town Hall.

== Public services and utilities ==
Sewer services are provided by the Metropolitan Sewerage District of Buncombe County.

Water services are provided by one of three water systems that serve various parts of Woodfin: Woodfin Water District, Asheville Water Authority, and Weaverville Water Department.

Town services include police, sanitation, street maintenance and construction, planning and zoning, animal control, street lighting, parks and recreation, and administration. Fire services are provided by one of three Fire Service Districts.
