= USS Emma =

USS Emma has been the name of more than one United States Navy ship, and may refer to:

- USS Emma (1863), a screw steamer, captured on 24 July 1863 and sold 1 November 1865
- USS Emma (SP-1223), a patrol boat in noncommissioned service from 1917 to 1918
