= E.M.M.A. =

Swedish girl group

- Origin: Stockholm, Sweden
- Genre: Pop/Techno
- Years active: 2001-2005
- Label: Egmont Music
- Spinoffs: B-Tween
- Members: Elin Klingfors; Martina Ståhl; Mari-Linn Almgren Klevhamre; Alexandra Pettersson

E.M.M.A was a Swedish girl group, mostly popular in Sweden. The group was founded by Keith Almgren who also wrote all the lyrics for their debut album. They have released three albums and eight singles. The group went on several small tours in Sweden. They came into existence in 2001 and officially broke up on 26 October 2005. The members were Elin Klingfors (born 25 December 1990), Martina Ståhl (born 1 December 1988), Mari-Linn Almgren Klevhamre (born 10 May 1992) and Alexandra Pettersson (born 22 February 1990).

== Discography ==
- Single "En hemlighet" - 2001
- Single "Varje gång" - 2001
- Album "E.M.M.A" - 2001
- Single "Bubblar i mej" - 2002
- Single "SMS" - 2002
- Album "Vänner" - 2002
- Single "Vi ska alltid vara vänner" - 2003
- Single "Bamses födelsedagsvisa" - 2003
- Single "Precis som du är" - 2004
- Album "Tur & Retur" - 2004
- Single "Sol, vind och vatten" - 2004

== B-Tween ==
In the Spring of 2006, two of the former band members (Martina Ståhl and Alexandra Pettersson) formed a new group since the breakup of E.M.M.A. The group was named "B-Tween" and are labelled as singing pop/disco house/R&B style music. As of January 2008, "B-Tween" had two songs listed on their website, "Dangerzone" and "Reaching for the Stars". It is unknown when, or if, a release will be made by this group in the future.
