= Emma, West Virginia =

Unincorporated community in West Virginia, United States

Emma
- Unincorporated community
- Location within the state of West Virginia Emma (the United States)
- Coordinates: 38°38′13″N 81°42′50″W
- Country: United States
- State: West Virginia
- County: Putnam
- Elevation: 935 ft (285 m)
- Time zone: UTC-5 (Eastern (EST))
  - Summer (DST): UTC-4 (EDT)
- GNIS ID: 1554399

Emma is an unincorporated community in Putnam County, West Virginia, United States.
