= European Medical Association =

The European Medical Association (EMA) was established by doctors from the 12 member states in 1990 in Belgium, EMA is the main association representing Medical Doctors in Europe, supporting the European Commission - Lifelong Learning Programme (LLP).
