= USS Emma (SP-1223) =

Patrol boat in service 1917-18

History

United States
- Name: USS Emma
- Namesake: Previous name retained
- Completed: 1891
- Acquired: 1917
- In service: 1917
- Out of service: 1918
- Notes: Operated as private motorboat Emma 1891-1917

General characteristics
- Type: Patrol vessel
- Tonnage: 11 GRT

The second USS Emma (SP-1223) was a United States Navy patrol vessel in service from 1917 to 1918.

Emma was built as a private motorboat of the same name in 1891. In 1917, the U.S. Navy acquired her from her owner for use as a section patrol boat during World War I. She was placed in non-commissioned service as USS Emma (SP-1223).

Assigned to the 5th Naval District, Emma served on patrol duties until sometime in 1918.
