= Textile Engineering College, Noakhali =

Textile Engineering College Noakhali located in Begumganj, Noakhali

Coordinates: 22.9426°N 91.1055°E

Textile Engineering College Noakhali
- টেক্সটাইল ইঞ্জিনিয়ারিং কলেজ নোয়াখালী
- Other name: TECN
- Motto: Textile Means Development and Prosperity
- Type: University ,
- Established: 1918; 108 years ago (as school)
- Accreditation: IEB, ITET, BHB, BJRI, BGMEA, BKMEA, BTMA
- Affiliations: Department of Textiles
- Academic affiliations: Bangladesh University of Textiles
- Endowment: Ministry of Textiles and Jute
- Budget: 4 Core BDT
- Chairman: Shah Alimuzzaman
- Principal: Abdur Rokib
- Academic staff: 49
- Administrative staff: 21
- Total staff: 70
- Students: 480
- Undergraduates: 480
- Location: Begumganj Upazila, Noakhali District, 3831, Bangladesh
- Campus: Suburban
- Language: English
- Website: tecn.edu.bd

The Textile Engineering College, Noakhali (Bengali: টেক্সটাইল ইঞ্জিনিয়ারিং কলেজ, নোয়াখালী) [TECN] is a textile engineering institute situated in Noakhali, Bangladesh, and affiliated with Bangladesh University of Textiles, which offers a B.Sc. in Textile Engineering degree.

TECN is one of the eight textile engineering colleges in Bangladesh which are collectively funded and controlled by the Directorate of Textiles, Ministry of Textiles and Jute.

== History ==
=== British weaving school ===
During British colonial rule from 1911 to 1929, 33 peripatetic weaving schools were established in East Bengal to meet the requirements for a textile technician by offering an artisan-level six-month course. Begumgonj Textile Engineering College, Noakhali, established in 1918, was one of these schools. In 1968 it was upgraded to a District Weaving School which offered a one-year course, and in 1981, to a District Textile Institute which offered a two-year certificate course in textile technology.

==== Further historical milestones ====
In 1993, a milestone three-year diploma course was introduced under the Bangladesh Technical Education Board (BTEB). The duration of this course was extended to four years in 2001. The college was upgraded in 2006 to offer a BSc in textile engineering, affiliated with the Bangladesh University of Textiles.

== Academics ==
TECN offers a four-year bachelor's degree program in textile engineering. It is one of the eight textile engineering colleges run by Bangladesh University of Textiles.

- Faculty of Fashion Design and Apparel Engineering:
  - Department of Apparel Engineering
- Faculty of Textile Chemical Engineering:
  - Department of Wet Process Engineering
- Faculty of Textile Engineering:
  - Department of Fabric Engineering
  - Department of Yarn Engineering

== Clubs ==
=== TECN Science and Innovation Club activities ===
==== TECN Fabric Day ====
The college hosted TECN Fabric Day 2024, organised by the TECN Science and Innovation Club. The event highlighted textile innovation and sustainability through an exhibition of fabric samples from 197 companies and a textile upcycling competition. The competition involved transformations of old garments into items such as handbags, pillows, and wall art.

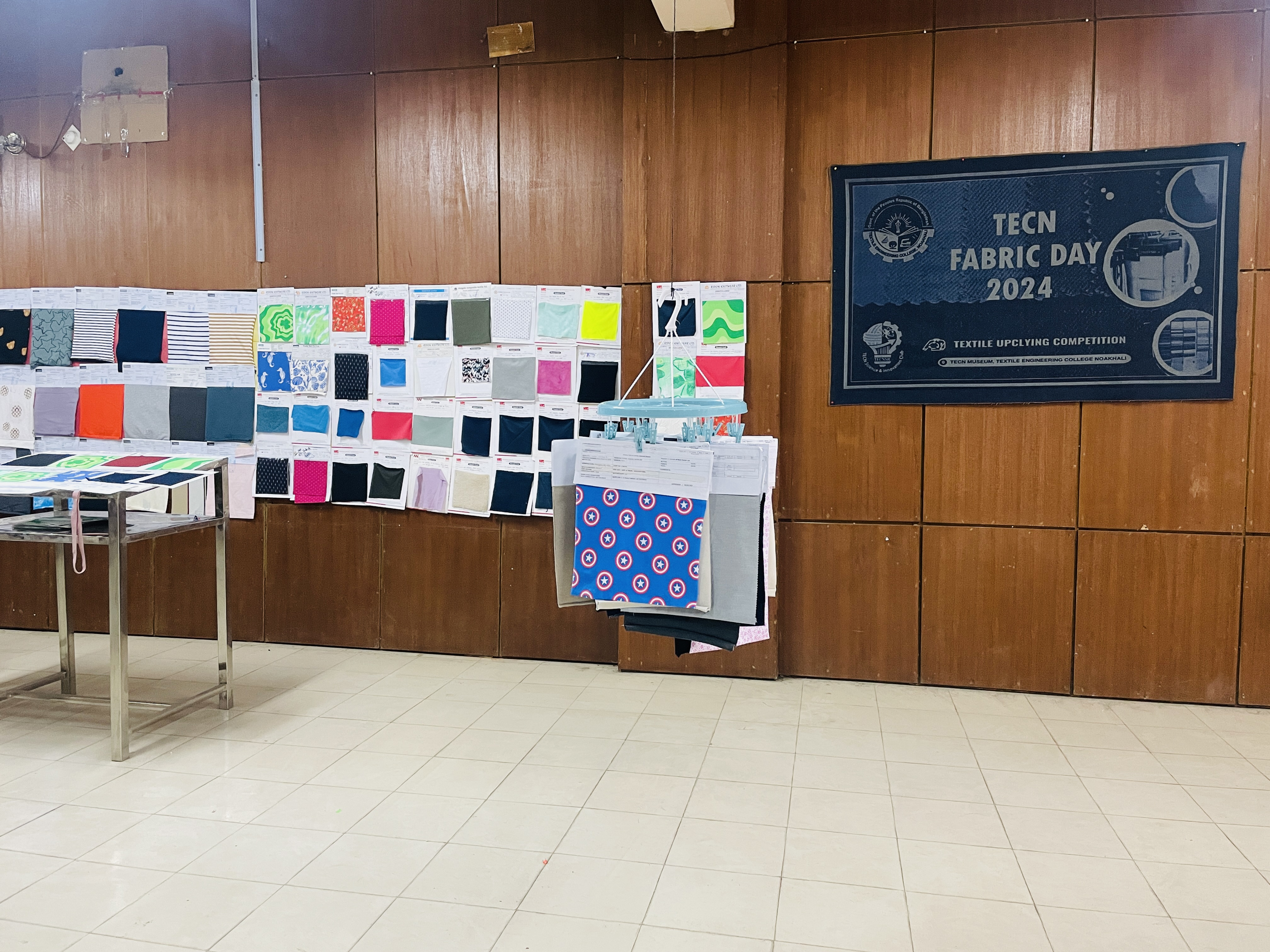
TECN Fabric Day 2024, organized by the TECN Science and Innovation Club.

== Number of seats ==
The number of seats for the four-year bachelor's degree in textile engineering program is given below.

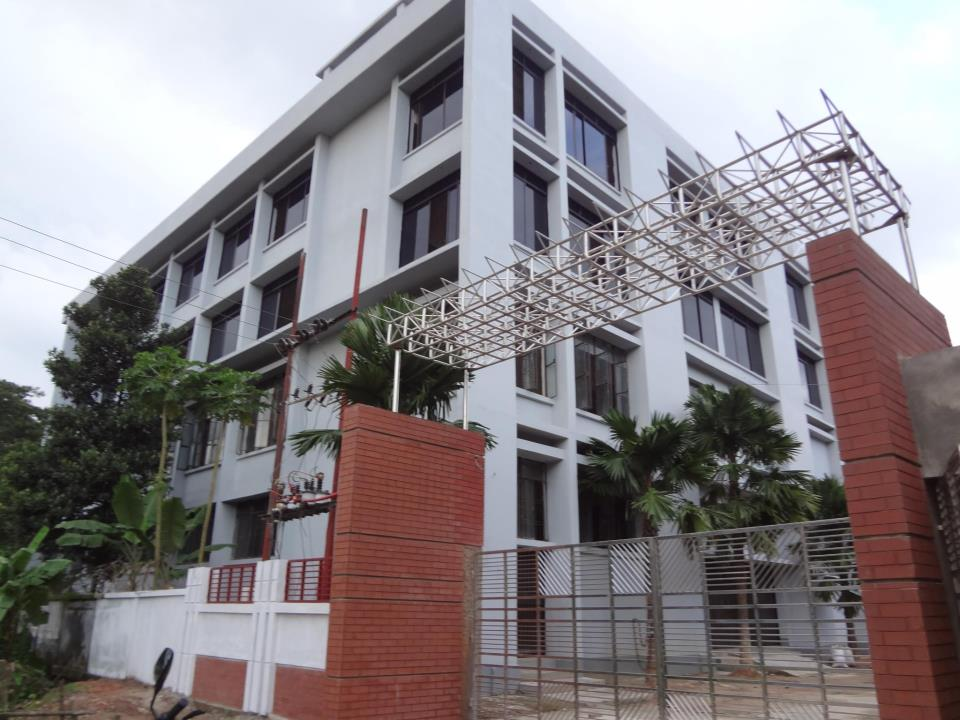
Campus of NTEC

Number of seats as per Department
Serial	Department	Seats
1.	Yarn Engineering	30
2.	Fabric Engineering	30
3.	Wet Process Engineering	30
4.	Apparel Engineering	30
	Total	120

== Hall Facilities ==
TECN has two hall facilities: one which accommodates 50 female students, and another which accommodates 150 male students.

== Admission ==
Selection of students for admission is determined via an admission test, which takes SSC and HSC examination results into consideration. Only science students can apply. The admission test is conducted on the basis of multiple choice questions (MCQ). Students have to answer physics, chemistry, higher math and English questions. The admission circular is published in national dailies, as well as on the college website and the website of the Department of Textiles (DOT). Students gain admission to specific colleges based on a merit list and their college preference list.

A single examination for this purpose was organized by Department of Textiles (DOT) for 8 textile engineering colleges under the affiliation of Bangladesh University of Textiles (BUTEX). Colleges which conduct exams together are: Textile Engineering College, Chittagong (2006), Pabna Textile Engineering College (2006), Textile Engineering College Noakhali (2007), Shahid Abdur Rab Serniabat Textile Engineering College (2010), Jhenaidah Textile Engineering College, Jhenaidah (2016), Dr. M A Wazed Miah Textile Engineering College (2018), Sheikh Rehana Textile Engineering College (2021) and Sheikh Hasina Textile Engineering College (2022).

== LAB Of TECN ==
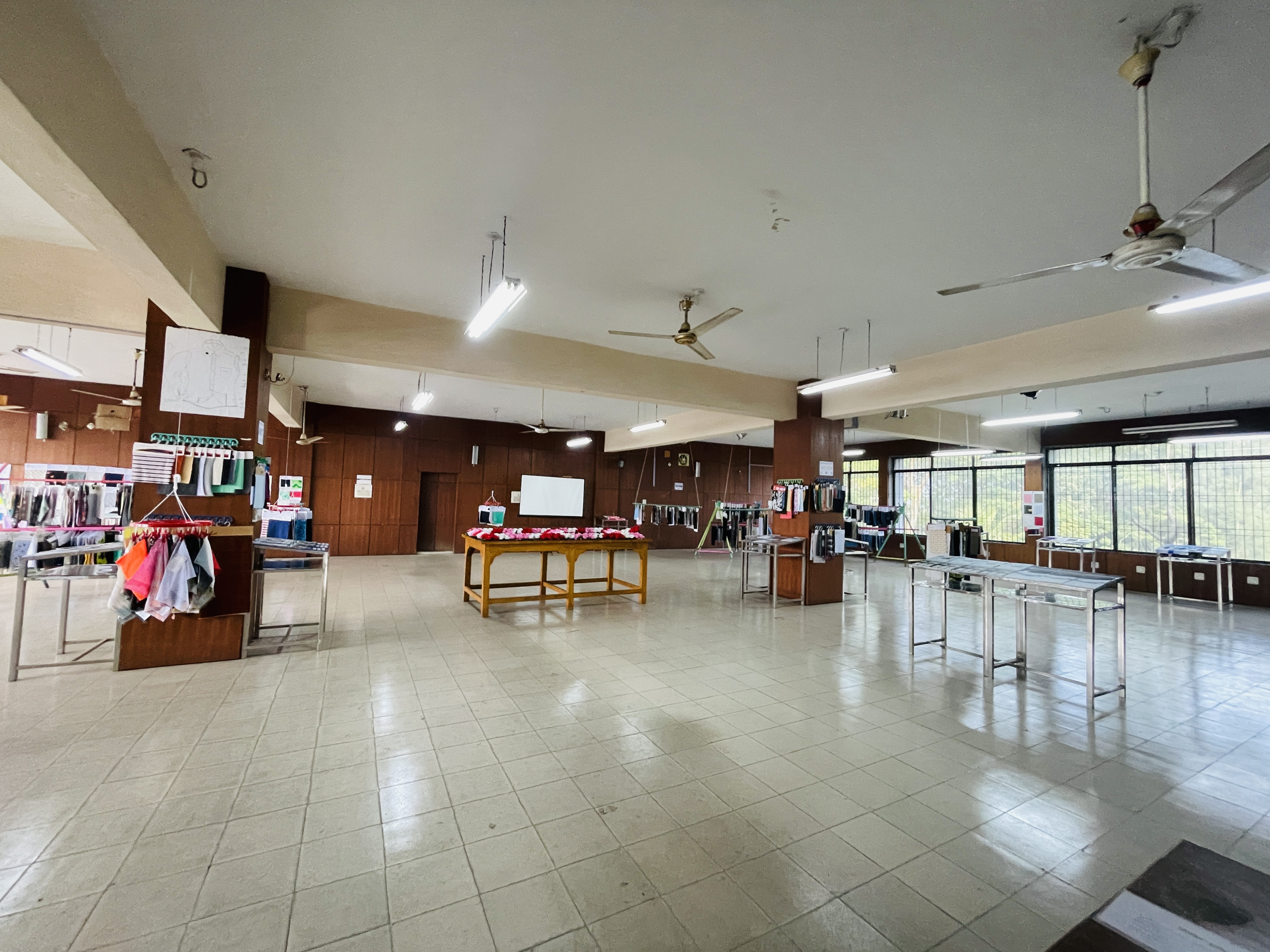
TECN Museum

- Dyeing Lab
- Cotton Spinning Lab
- Jute Spinning Lab
- Fabric Lab
- Garments Lab
- Textile Testing & Quality Control Lab
- Computer Lab
- Mechanical Workshop Lab
- Physics Lab
- Chemistry Lab

== TECN Alumni Association (TECNAA) ==
The TECN Alumni Association (TECNAA) is the official alumni organization for graduates of Textile Engineering College, Noakhali. Established in 2017, TECNAA was formed with a mandate from the college's alumni to enhance networking, foster communication, and strengthen bonds among members of the institution. With 98.8% of eligible alumni participating, TECNAA gained official acceptance from the college following a referendum on March 26, 2017, in which the association's constitution and bylaws were unanimously approved.

TECNAA focuses on advancing the mission of Textile Engineering College, Noakhali, by organizing events, supporting initiatives, and serving as a bridge between current students, alumni, and the institution. Further information about the organization and its activities can be found on the official TECNAA website at www.tecnaa.org.

== See also ==
- Education in Bangladesh
- Textile schools in Bangladesh
- List of colleges in Bangladesh
- Textile Engineering College, Chittagong
- Pabna Textile Engineering College
- Shahid Abdur Rab Serniabat Textile Engineering College
- Sheikh Kamal Textile Engineering College, Jhenaidah
- Dr. M A Wazed Miah Textile Engineering College
