= Textile Engineering College, Chittagong =

College in Bangladesh

Coordinates: 22.9440°N 91.1055°E

Textile Engineering College, Zorarganj, Chittagong
- টেক্সটাইল ইঞ্জিনিয়ারিং কলেজ, জোরারগঞ্জ, চট্টগ্রাম
- Other name: CTEC
- Type: Public
- Established: 1911; 115 years ago (as school)
- Accreditation: IEB, ITET, BHB, BJRI, BGMEA, BKMEA, BTMA
- Academic affiliations: Bangladesh University of Textiles
- Endowment: Ministry of Textiles and Jute
- Chairman: Shah Alimuzzaman
- Principal: Md. Solaiman
- Academic staff: 28
- Administrative staff: 12
- Students: 420
- Undergraduates: 420
- Location: Zorargonj, Mirsharai Upazila, Chittagong, Bangladesh
- Campus: Suburban, 18 acres (7.3 ha)
- Language: English
- Website: ctec.chittagong.gov.bd

Textile Engineering College, Zorargonj, Chittagong (Bengali: টেক্সটাইল ইঞ্জিনিয়ারিং কলেজ, জোরারগঞ্জ, চট্টগ্রাম) is a college in Bangladesh, offering bachelor's degree in textile engineering. It is situated by the side of old Dhaka Trunk Road which passes through Zorargonj, Mirsharai, Chittagong. It is one of the seven constituent textile engineering colleges of Bangladesh University of Textiles, which are collectively funded by the Department of Textiles.

== History ==
It was established in 1911 as a peripatetic weaving school, as a result of the Swadeshi movement. It moved to the entry point of Mohuri Project Road in 1960.

In 1980, the weaving school's courses were upgraded to two-year certificate courses in textile technology; the weaving school was renamed District Textile Institute. In 1994, a three-year textile engineering diploma course was introduced in the institution under the Bangladesh Technical Education Board. The duration of the course was extended to four years in 2001.

The diploma program was superseded by a four-year Bachelor of Science program in textile engineering, affiliated to the University of Chittagong, in the 2006–2007 session. It was declared a college on 13 January 2006. Since the 2012–2013 session, the college has been affiliated with Bangladesh University of Textiles.

The college provides textile education. The Textile Engineering College operates under the administrative control of the Department of Textiles of the Ministry of Textiles and Jute.

== Academics ==
CTEC offers a four-year bachelor's degree program in textile engineering. It is one of the seven textile engineering colleges run by Bangladesh University of Textiles.

- Faculty of Fashion Design and Apparel Engineering:
  - Department of Apparel Engineering
- Faculty of Textile Chemical Engineering:
  - Department of Wet Process Engineering
- Faculty of Textile Engineering:
  - Department of Fabric Engineering
  - Department of Yarn Engineering

== Number of seats ==
The number of seats for the four-year bachelor's degree in textile engineering programmes is given below:

Serial	Department	Seats
1.	Apparel Engineering	30
2.	Fabric Engineering	30
3.	Wet Process Engineering	30
4.	Yarn Engineering	30
	Total	120

== Admission ==
Admission into the college is competitive and needs a high academic attainment at the primary and secondary school levels. Selection of the student for admission is made through an admission test.

Almost sixty percent of the total students get stipend on the basis of merit during their academic years.

== Facilities ==
There are two hostels for male students and there is a hostel for female students.

The medical services include a medical center with one full-time doctor and a medical assistant. The students are examined free of cost.

The college library has a collection of technical and non-technical books. Library access is open to teachers, students and staff.

There is a co-ordination teacher for each year who looks after the students' affairs.

== See also ==
- Education in Bangladesh
- Textile schools in Bangladesh
- List of colleges in Bangladesh
- Pabna Textile Engineering College
- Textile Engineering College, Noakhali
- Shahid Abdur Rab Serniabat Textile Engineering College
- Sheikh Kamal Textile Engineering College, Jhenaidah
- Dr. M A Wazed Miah Textile Engineering College
