= Pabna Textile Engineering College =

Engineering College in Bangladesh

- পাবনা টেক্সটাইল ইঞ্জিনিয়ারিং কলেজ
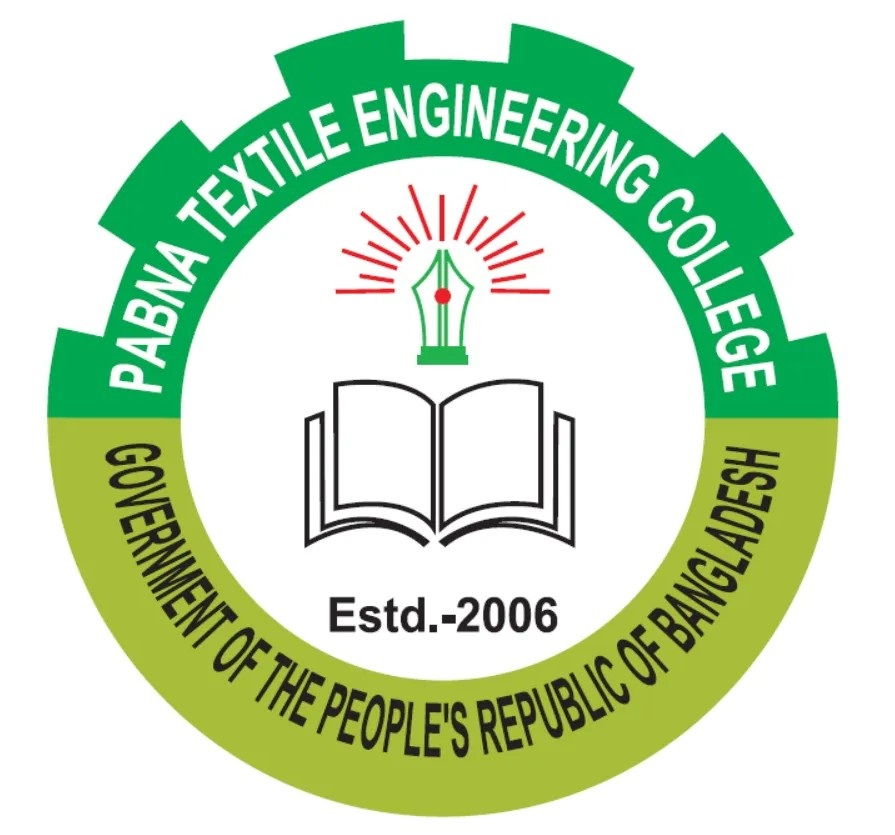
- Former names: Pabna Govt. Weaving School, Pabna Textile Institute
- Type: Public, Research
- Established: 1915; 111 years ago (as school)
- Accreditation: IEB, ITET, BHB, BJRI, BGMEA, BKMEA, BTMA
- Academic affiliations: Bangladesh University of Textiles
- Chairman: Dr. Md. Zulhas Uddin
- Principal: Engr. Md. Bakhtiar Hossain
- Location: Pabna, Bangladesh; 24.0203°N 89.2491°E
- Campus: Urban
- Website: https://ptec.college.gov.bd/

Pabna Textile Engineering College is a government educational institution in Pabna, Bangladesh that offers a bachelor's degree in textile engineering. It is operated by a department of the Ministry of Textiles and Jute, and an affiliated college of the Bangladesh University of Textiles.

== History ==
Pabna Government Weaving School was established in 1915. It was one of five such outlying schools affiliated to the Serampore Weaving Institute. The school offered a course three to six months in duration, given in Bengali, that taught "practical weaving, design and analysis of cloth, yarn calculation and drawing". By 1921, it was instructing 22 students, the sons of weavers, on 14 fly-shuttle looms.

When the Department of Textiles (DoT) was established in 1978, it took over operation of the school. The DoT also oversaw the public sector textile mills, and expected demand for more mid-level supervisors and skilled technicians in the industry. In 1980, a two years certificate course was introduced. In 1995, that was replaced by a three-year diploma in textile engineering, at which point the school was renamed Pabna Textile Institute.

In March 2010, the Executive Committee of the National Economic Council approved a 450 million Bangladeshi taka ($6.4M as of 2010) project to upgrade Pabna Textile Institute to Pabna Textile Engineering College. It then offered a four years B.Sc. in textile engineering in affiliation with the University of Rajshahi, and had 80 students. By 2019, it was an affiliated college of Bangladesh University of Textiles.

== Academics ==
PTEC offers a four-year B.Sc. in Textile Engineering under the affiliation of Bangladesh University of Textiles (BUTEX). Concerned departments of the college are given below:

1. Department of Yarn Engineering
2. Department of Fabric Engineering
3. Department of Wet Process Engineering
4. Department of Apparel Engineering

== Number of seats ==
The number of seats for the four-year bachelor's degree in textile engineering program is given below.

Number of seats as per Dept.
Serial	Department	Seats
1.	Yarn Engineering	30
2.	Fabric Engineering	30
3.	Wet Process Engineering	30
4.	Apparel Engineering	30
	Total	120

== Admission ==
Admission into this college is competitive and needs a high academic attainment at the SSC and HSC examination. Selection of the student for admission is made through an admission test. Only science students can apply for the admission test. Admission circular is published in the national dailies, college website and website of the Department of Textiles (DOT).

Department of Textiles (DOT) offers 4 years of BSc in Textile Engineering Degree. A single examination was organized by Department of Textiles (DOT) for 8 textile engineering colleges under the affiliation of Bangladesh University of Textiles (BUTEX). Colleges which conduct exams together are: CTEC (2006), PTEC (2006), TECN (2007), SARSTEC (2010), JTEC (2016), DWMTEC (2018), SRTEC (2021) & SHTEC (2022)

The admission test is conducted on the basis of Multiple Choice Questions (MCQ). Students have to answer Physics, Chemistry, Higher Math & English in the admission test. Students can get admission in certain college based on merit list and college preference list.

== See also ==
- Education in Bangladesh
- Textile schools in Bangladesh
- List of colleges in Bangladesh
- Textile Engineering College, Chittagong
- Textile Engineering College, Noakhali
- Shahid Abdur Rab Serniabat Textile Engineering College
- Sheikh Kamal Textile Engineering College, Jhenaidah
- Dr. M A Wazed Miah Textile Engineering College
