= Rangpur Textile Engineering College =

Public textile engineering college in Bangladesh

- রংপুর টেক্সটাইল ইঞ্জিনিয়ারিং কলেজে
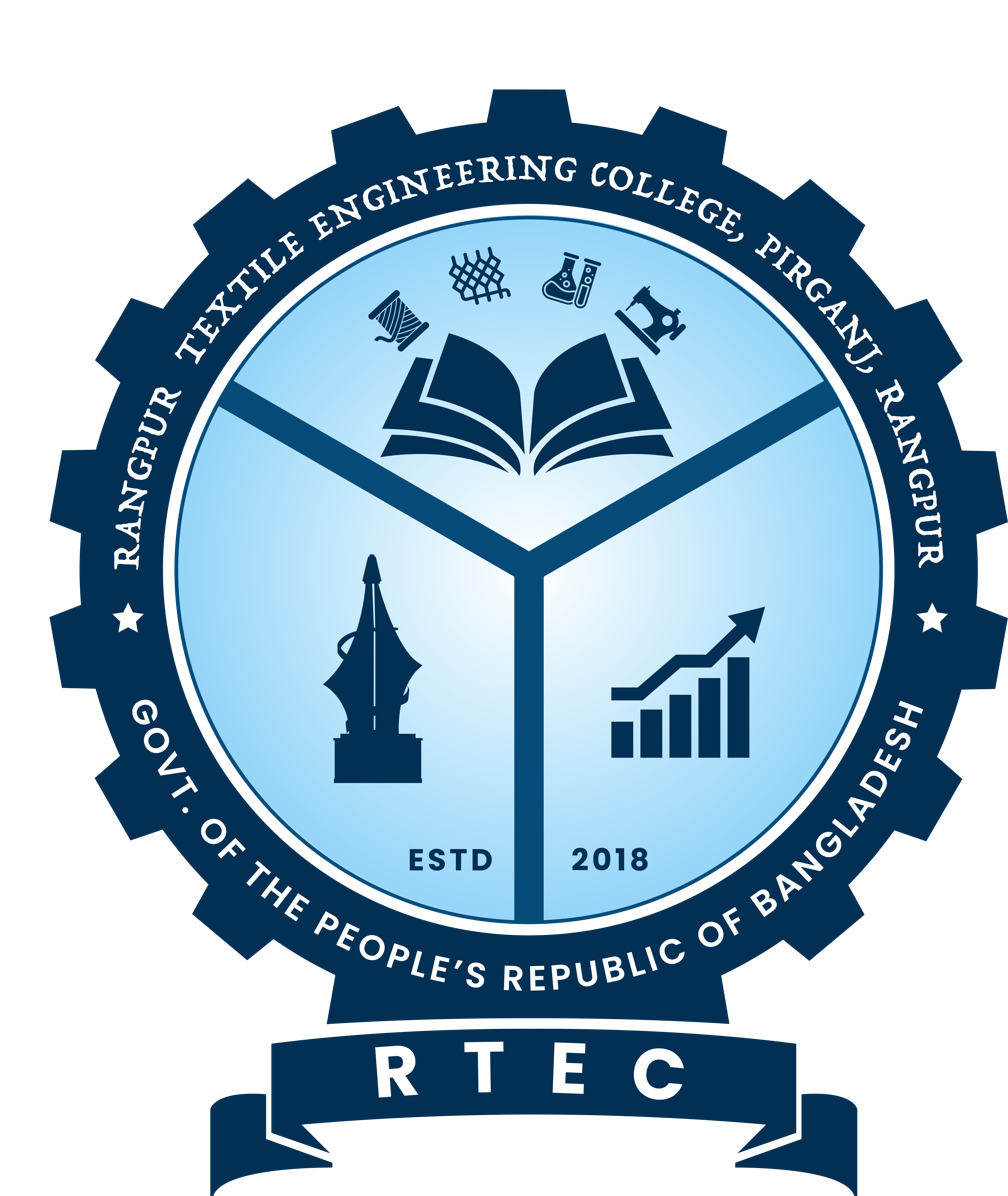
- Other name: RTEC
- Type: Public, Research
- Established: BSc (2018)
- Parent institution: Bangladesh University of Textiles
- Accreditation: Institution of Engineers, ITET, BHB, BJRI, BGMEA, BKMEA, BTMA
- Affiliations: Department of Textiles (Bangladesh)
- Academic affiliations: Bangladesh University of Textiles
- Endowment: Ministry of Textiles and Jute
- Chairman: Shah Alimuzzaman
- Principal: Engineer Md. Ronju Mia
- Students: 687
- Undergraduates: 567
- Location: Tukuriya, Pirganj Upazila, Rangpur, Bangladesh; 25.4311°N 89.1500°E
- Language: English
- Website: rtec.pirgonj.rangpur.gov.bd

Rangpur Textile Engineering College is located in Rangpur District, Bangladesh, and is affiliated with the Bangladesh University of Textiles.

== History ==
In August 2018, the executive committee of the National Economic Council approved the establishment of the college at a cost of Tk 1.746 billion Bangladeshi taka (equivalent to $20.8 million in 2018).

After the fall of the Sheikh Hasina led Awami League government, Dr MA Wazed Miah Textile Engineering College was renamed to Rangpur Textile Engineering College in February 2025.

== Academics ==
RTEC offers a four-year B.Sc. in Textile Engineering under the affiliation of Bangladesh University of Textiles (BUTEX). Concerned departments of the college are given below:

- Department of Yarn Engineering
- Department of Fabric Engineering
- Department of Wet Process Engineering
- Department of Apparel Engineering

== Number of seats ==
The number of seats for the four-year bachelor's degree in textile engineering program is given below.

Number of seats as per Dept.
Serial	Department	Seats
1.	Yarn Engineering	30
2.	Fabric Engineering	30
3.	Wet Process Engineering	30
4.	Apparel Engineering	30
	Total	120

== Admission ==
Admission into this college is competitive and needs a high academic attainment at the SSC and HSC examination. Selection of the student for admission is made through an admission test. Only Science Students can apply for the admission test. Admission circular is published in the national dailies, college website and website of the Department of Textiles (DOT),

Department of Textiles (DOT) offers 4 years of BSc in Textile Engineering Degree. A single examination was organized by Department of Textiles (DOT) for 8 textile engineering colleges under the affiliation of Bangladesh University of Textiles (BUTEX). Colleges which conduct exams together are: CTEC (2006), PTEC (2006), TECN (2007), SARSTEC (2010), JTEC (2016), DWMTEC (2018), SRTEC (2021) & SHTEC (2022)

The admission test is conducted on the basis of Multiple Choice Questions (MCQ). Students have to answer Physics, Chemistry, Higher Math & English in the admission test. Students can get admission in certain college based on merit list and college preference list.

== See also ==
- Education in Bangladesh
- Textile schools in Bangladesh
- List of colleges in Bangladesh
- Textile Engineering College, Chittagong
- Pabna Textile Engineering College
- Textile Engineering College, Noakhali
- Shahid Abdur Rab Serniabat Textile Engineering College
- Sheikh Kamal Textile Engineering College, Jhenaidah
