= Textile Engineering College =

Textile Engineering College may refer to:

- Textile Engineering College, Chittagong, a textile college in Chittagong, Bangladesh
- Textile Engineering College, Noakhali, a textile college in Noakhali, Bangladesh
- Pabna Textile Engineering College, a textile college in Pabna, Bangladesh
- Tangail Textile Engineering College, a textile college in Tangail, Bangladesh
- Jhenaidah Textile Engineering College, a textile college in Jhenaidah, Bangladesh
- Barishal Textile Engineering College, a textile college in Barishal, Bangladesh
- Rangpur Textile Engineering College, a textile college in Rangpur, Bangladesh
