= Textile schools in Bangladesh =

Textile schools in Bangladesh offer various academic and professional degrees in textile fields. A number of colleges and technical institutes as well as some universities offer diploma, bachelor's and master's degree from their allocated faculties upon completion of certification courses. Textile courses offered in these schools include spinning, weaving, knitting, dyeing, printing, finishing, apparels merchandising and fashion designing. As of 2019, textile material is the largest export item of Bangladesh. Bangladesh exported $42.35 billion worth of readymade garments in the 2018–2019 fiscal year.

== Public textile educational institutions ==
There are 5 public universities,12 public engineering colleges (10 college for general background and 2 college for diploma students)in Bangladesh that offer Bachelor's degrees in textile-related courses and Textile Engineering.

- Bangladesh University of Textiles (BUTEX)
- Dhaka University of Engineering and Technology (DUET) (For diploma background)
- Khulna University of Engineering and Technology (KUET)
- Mawlana Bhashani Science and Technology University (MBSTU)
- Jashore University of Science and Technology (JUST)
- Textile Engineering College, Noakhali, (TECN) affiliated with BUTEX.
- Textile Engineering College, Chittagong, (CTEC) affiliated with BUTEX.
- Pabna Textile Engineering College, Pabna, (PTEC) affiliated with BUTEX
- Barishal Textile Engineering College, Barishal, (BTEC) affiliated with BUTEX.
- Jhenaidah Textile Engineering College, Jhenaidah, (JTEC) affiliated with BUTEX.
- Rangpur Textile Engineering College, Rangpur, (RTEC) affiliated with BUTEX.
- Tangail Textile Engineering College, Tangail, (TTEC) (For diploma background) affiliated with BUTEX.
- Gopalganj Textile Engineering College, Gopalganj (GTEC) affiliated with BUTEX.
- Jamalpur Textile Engineering College, Jamalpur, (JTEC) affiliated with BUTEX.
- MadaripurTextile Engineering College, Madaripur, (MTEC) affiliated with BUTEX
- Sylhet Textile engineering college, Sylhet, (STEC) affiliated with BUTEX
- Narsingdi Textile Engineering College, Narsingdi (NTEC) (Ex BHETI, For diploma background)affiliated with BUTEX

=== Specialized Public B.Sc. Textile Engineering Colleges ===
Colleges	Acronym	Founded	Affiliation	Location	Division	Specialization	Ph.D. granting	Website
Textile Engineering College, Noakhali	TECN	2006	BUTEX	Begumganj Upazila, Noakhali District	Chittagong Division	Textile Engineering	No	link
Textile Engineering College, Chittagong.	CTEC	2006	BUTEX	Zorargonj, Mirsharai Upazila, Chittagong	Chittagong Division	Textile Engineering	No	link
Pabna Textile Engineering College.	PTEC	2006	BUTEX	Pabna	Rajshahi Division	Textile Engineering	No	link
Tangail Textile Engineering College.	TTEC	2007	BUTEX	Kalihati, Tangail	Dhaka Division	Textile Engineering	No	[link]
Barishal Textile Engineering College.	SARSTEC	2010	BUTEX	Barisal	Barisal Division	Textile Engineering	No	link
Jhenaidah Textile Engineering College, Jhenaidah.	JTEC	2016	BUTEX	Jhenaidah	Khulna Division	Textile Engineering	No	link
Rangpur Textile Engineering College.	RTEC	2018	BUTEX	Tukuriya, Pirganj Upazila, Rangpur	Rangpur Division	Textile Engineering	No	link
Bangladesh Handloom Education & Training Institute.	BHETI	2018	BUTEX	Narsingdi, Narsingdi sadar Upazila, Dhaka	Dhaka Division	Textile Engineering	No	link
Gopalganj Textile Engineering College.	GTEC	2021	BUTEX	Gopalgang, Dhaka	Dhaka Division	Textile Engineering	No	link
Jamalpur Textile Engineering College, Melandaha, Jamalpur.	JMTEC	2022	BUTEX	Bhabki Bazar, Melandaha Upzila, Jamalpur District	Mymensigh Division	Textile Engineering	No	[link]

== Public-private partnerships ==
- National Institute of Textile Engineering and Research (NITER) : An affiliated institute of technology of University of Dhaka, offering research based textiles education in both undergraduate and postgraduate levels. It used to be considered as the second with its rank among its kind in the region. Formerly, it was a public institute named Textile Institute and Development Center (TIDC). It is the first and only public–private partnership (PPP) educational institution in Bangladesh.

== Diploma in textile institutes (public) ==
A bunch of state funded diploma institutes under the authority of Bangladesh Technical Education Board and with compliance to the order of the Institution of Textile Engineers and Technologists (ITET) are operating in Bangladesh at present. Several more are still on the ongoing process of parliamentary approval.

Among them 15 textile institute are now operational.

These are —

1. Barishal Textile Institute, Barishal
2. Bhola Textile Institute, Bhola
3. Khulna Textile Institute, Khulna
4. Tangail Textile Institute, Tangail
5. Natore Textile Institute, Natore
6. Rangpur Textile Institute, Rangpur
7. Chattogram Textile Institute, Chattagram
8. Dinajpur Textile Institute, Dinajpur
9. Jamalpur Textile Institute, Madarganj, Jamalpur
10. Naogaon Textile Institute, Manda, Naogaon
11. Sirajgonj Textile Engineering Institute, Kazipur, Sirajgonj
12. Sunamganj Textile Institute, Sunamganj
13. Faridpur Textile Institute, Faridpur
14. Sylhet Textile Institute, Sylhet
15. Lalmonirhat Textile Institute, Lalmonirhat
16. Feni Textile Institute, Feni (Waiting for Govt. Approval)
17. Shahrasti Textile Institute, Chandpur (Waiting for Govt. Approval)
18. Narayangonj Textile Institute, Narayangonj (Project in Process)
19. Netrokona Textile Institute, Netrokona (Project in Process)
20. Jashore Textile Institute, Jashore (Project in Process)
21. Joypurhat Textile Institute, Joypurhat (Project in Process)
22. Mymensingh Textile Institute, Mymensingh (Project in Process)
23. Kushtia Textile Institute, Kushtia (Project in Process)
24. Sherpur Textile Institute, Sherpur (Project in Process)

== Private universities offering textile courses ==
There are about 25 private universities and colleges in Bangladesh that offer Bachelor's degrees in textile-related courses and Textile Engineering.

1. Ahsanullah University of Science and Technology
2. Anwar Khan Modern University
3. Atish Dipankar University of Science and Technology
4. Bangladesh University of Business and Technology
5. BGMEA University of Fashion & Technology
6. The International University of Scholars
7. City University, Bangladesh
8. Daffodil International University
9. European University of Bangladesh
10. Fareast International University
11. Green University of Bangladesh
12. International Standard University
13. Northern University, Bangladesh
14. Port City International University
15. Primeasia University
16. Rajshahi Science & Technology University
17. Shanto-Mariam University of Creative Technology
18. Shyamoli Textile Engineering College
19. Sonargaon University
20. Southeast University, Bangladesh
21. The International University of Scholars
22. The People's University of Bangladesh
23. University of South Asia
24. Uttara University
25. World University of Bangladesh

== Private polytechnic offering diploma in textile courses ==
1. Shyamoli Ideal Polytechnic Institute
2. Daffodil Polytechnic Institute
3. Mangrove Institute of Science and Technology
4. Bangladesh Institute of Information Technology
5. Haji Abul Hossain Institute of Technology
6. National Institute of Technology, Chattogram
7. Ahsanullah Institute of Technical and Vocational Education, Dhaka
8. Mirpur Polytechnic Institute, Mirpur, Dhaka
9. National Institute of Engineering and Technology
10. Bangladesh Polytechnic Institute
11. City Textile Engineering Institute
12. Bangladesh Institute of Technology
13. National Polytechnic Institute, Dhaka
14. National Polytechnic College, Chittagong
15. Bangladesh Textile Engineering College
16. Progressive Polytechnic Institute
17. Sirajganj Ideal Textile Engineering Institute (SITEI), Sirajganj
18. Sirajganj Institute of Textile Engineering and Technology (SITET), Sirajganj
19. Gaibandha Institute of Engineering and Technology (GIET), Gaibandha

== Private institutes offering textile courses ==
1. Apparel Institute of Fashion and Technology, affiliated with National University.
2. Bangladesh Institute of Business and Technology, affiliated with National University.
3. BCMC College of Engineering & Technology, affiliated with University of Rajshahi.
4. BGIFT Institute of Science and Technology, affiliated with National University.
5. Chattogram BGMEA Institute of Fashion and Technology, affiliated with National University.
6. Chattogram Institute of Engineering and Technology, affiliated with University of Chittagong.
7. Chattogram Institute of Fashion and Technology, affiliated with University of Chittagong.
8. College of Fashion Technology and Management, affiliated with National University.
9. Dhaka Institute of Fashion and Technology, affiliated with National University.
10. Ideal Technical Training Center, operated by Bangladesh Technical Education Board.
11. Inspiration Institute of Design and Technology, affiliated with National University.
12. Institute of Science, Trade and Technology, affiliated with National University.
13. National Institute of Design, affiliated with National University.
14. National Institute of Fashion Technology, affiliated with National University.
15. Newcastle University College, affiliated with University of Chittagong.
16. Professional Institute of Science and Fashion Technology, affiliated with National University.
17. Sikder College of Textile and Fashion Technology, affiliated with National University.
18. Shyamoli Textile Engineering College, affiliated with University of Dhaka.
19. TMSS Engineering College, affiliated with University of Rajshahi.
20. Ideal Textile Institute, operated by Bangladesh Technical Education Board.

== Textile vocational institutes ==
Currently, there are a total of 41 textile vocational institutes throughout Bangladesh under the Department of Textiles, government of the People's Republic of Bangladesh. The department is planning to set up 12 more textile vocational institutes in the coming years.

== See also ==
- Education in Bangladesh
- List of universities in Bangladesh
- List of schools in Bangladesh
- List of colleges in Bangladesh
- List of institutes in Bangladesh
- List of medical colleges in Bangladesh
- List of dental schools in Bangladesh
- List of architecture schools in Bangladesh
- University Grants Commission (Bangladesh)
