= Bangladesh University of Textiles =

Public Research University, Bangladesh

Coordinates: 23.7604°N 90.4001°E

- বাংলাদেশ টেক্সটাইল বিশ্ববিদ্যালয়
- Emblem of BUTEX
- Other name: BUTEX
- Former names: • British Weaving School (1921-1935); • East Bengal Textile Institute (1935-1950); • East Pakistan Textile Institute (1950-1971); • Bangladesh Textile Institute (1971-1978); • College of Textile Engineering and Technology (1978-2010)
- Motto: Knowledge Is Power
- Type: Public Research University
- Established: 1921; 105 years ago as Waving School; 22 December, 2010; 16 years ago as university
- Accreditation: BAB, IEB, ITET, BGMEA, BKMEA, BTMC, BTMA, BHB, BJMA, BJMC, BJRI, BSDB, BSRTI
- Affiliations: University Grants Commission (UGC)
- Academic affiliations: GTEC; RTEC; BHETI; PTEC; TTEC; CTEC; TECN; BTEC; JTEC; NTEC
- Endowment: ৳ 462.2 million (in 2023-24 budget)
- Chancellor: President Mirza Fakhrul Islam Alamgir
- Vice-Chancellor: Md. Zulhash Uddin
- Academic staff: 149
- Administrative staff: 111
- Students: 3,039
- Undergraduates: 2,943
- Postgraduates: 96
- Location: 92, Shaheed Tajuddin Ahmed Avenue, Tejgaon Industrial Area, Dhaka, 1208, Bangladesh
- Campus: Urban, 11.57 acres (4.68 ha)
- Language: English
- Colors: Cardinal Red
- Website: butex.edu.bd

Bangladesh University of Textiles, commonly referred to as BUTEX, is a public university in Bangladesh, situated in Tejgaon, Dhaka. It is the only public university in Bangladesh to teach textile engineering. The institution established education which sustains the entrepreneurship and industrialisation in the RMG industry of Bangladesh.

This institution has nine (9) government textile engineering affiliated colleges, each of which is textile based institutes of technology. The colleges are centrally regulated by the university while funding is provisioned under a bilateral Memorandum of understanding signed between Ministry of Education, Bangladesh and Department of Textiles, Bangladesh.

The university itself offers academic and professional degrees in various fields of textile technology, advanced international business and marketing strategies and in several other disciplines on both undergraduate and postgraduate levels.

== History ==
The institution was originally established in 1921 as a weaving school at Narinda, Dhaka, during the British colonial rule, to provide specialized technical education in the fields of textile by offering artisan-level courses. It used to go by the name "British Weaving School". A while later, it took the name "East Bengal Textile Institute" only to offer diploma courses in textile manufacturing process. In 1957, The institute was transferred to its present campus at Tejgaon Industrial Area and set its foundation stone by Bangabandhu Sheikh Mujibur Rahman. In 1960, it started academic activities renamed as "East Pakistan Textile Institute".

In the post-liberation era of Bangladesh, in 1971, the institute was renamed as "Bangladesh Textile Institute". Afterward, in 1978, the institute launched a four-year period bachelor's degree program in textile technology in affiliation with University of Dhaka and re-branded itself as "College of Textile Engineering and Technology". Initially, intake was only 60 per year and more than 4,800 textile engineers and technologists have graduated from this institution since the introduction of bachelor's degree course.

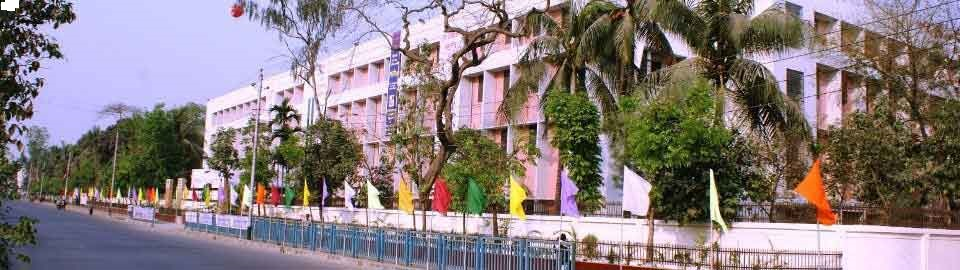
Central Administrative Building, BUTEX

The college of textile engineering and technology was run under the administrative control of the Bangladesh education ministry through Directorate of Technical Education which offered Bachelor of Science in textile technology and in textile management courses as a constituent college of the University of Dhaka.

The government of Bangladesh took initiatives to upgrade the College of Textile Engineering and Technology into a full-fledged university. After receiving a formal consent from the President of Bangladesh to fulfill that purpose, the "Bangladesh Textile University Act, 2010" (Act no. 49, 2010) was passed by the Bangladesh national assembly on 5 October 2010. The act was made effective from 22 December 2010 as per SRO No. 395-law/2010 date 20 December 2010 of the Ministry of Education, Bangladesh.

The then-prime minister of Bangladesh, Sheikh Hasina, officially inaugurated the revamped institution with its present naming scheme the following year on 15 March.

== Campus life ==
=== Student activities ===
Several student run organizations or clubs in the institution allow its members and participants to engage in co-curricular and extra-curricular activities. The university administration permits their formation, provides them with necessary funding and associates a selected portion of them with faculty guidance. Some of the clubs are branches of large organizations expanding their countrywide and sometimes, global network, among youths.

=== Student residences ===
There are 4 halls to provide public residence for the regular students. Administrative head in charge of a dormitory is its provost, who is elected from among the institution faculty, and is granted the duty for a two-year time period.

They are listed below:

Hall Name	Seat	Provost
Shahid Aziz Hall	245	Md. Emdad Sarker
M.A.G. Osmani Hall	296	Md. Sayduzzaman
Syed Nazrul Islam Hall	216	Mahbubor Rahman
Sheikh Hasina Hall	164	Hasina Akter

Each of these facilities are named after eminent historical figures of Bangladesh, only exception being the Sheikh Hasina Hall.

=== Sports facilities ===
The institution has a centrally located playground inside of the campus for its students and the faculty. There are two other separate playgrounds, one of which is located at the premises of the Shahid Aziz Hall (indoor sports), while the other is at the G.M.A.G. Osmani Hall — being the largest playground of them all.

== Textile Talent Hunt ==
Textile Talent Hunt (TTH) is a talent grooming competition held in Bangladesh. Bangladesh's first ever competition for textile manufacturing students. It targets undergraduate students studying textile, garments, fashion, and related disciplines. The competition is organized by Textile Today, in collaboration with the Bangladesh University of Textiles.

== Notable alumni ==
- Mozaffar Hossain was elected member of parliament (M.P.) for the Jamalpur-5 constituency in 2018.
- Md. Abul Kashem was the chairman of the Bangladesh Technical Education Board from 2009 to 2014.

== Affiliated institutes and colleges ==
There are 10 institutions (9 colleges and 1 institute) under the affiliation of Bangladesh University of Textiles (BUTEX).

=== BSc. in Textile Public Engineering Colleges ===
The most decorated 9 affiliated textile engineering college are as:

Colleges	Acronym	Founded	Affiliation	Location	Division	Specialization	Ph.D. granting	Website
Textile Engineering College, Noakhali	TECN	2006	BUTEX	Begumganj Upazila, Noakhali District	Chittagong Division	Textile Engineering	No	link
Textile Engineering College, Chittagong	CTEC	2006	BUTEX	Zorargonj, Mirsharai Upazila, Chittagong	Chittagong Division	Textile Engineering	No	link
Pabna Textile Engineering College	PTEC	2006	BUTEX	Pabna	Rajshahi Division	Textile Engineering	No	link
Barishal Textile Engineering College	BTEC	2010	BUTEX	Barisal	Barisal Division	Textile Engineering	No	link
Jhenaidah Textile Engineering College, Jhenaidah	JTEC	2016	BUTEX	Jhenaidah	Khulna Division	Textile Engineering	No	link
Rangpur Textile Engineering College	RTEC	2018	BUTEX	Tukuriya, Pirganj Upazila, Rangpur	Rangpur Division	Textile Engineering	No	link
Gopalganj Textile Engineering College	GTEC	2021	BUTEX	Gopalgang, Dhaka	Dhaka Division	Textile Engineering	No	link
Jamalpur Textile Engineering College	JTEC	2022	BUTEX	Bhabki Bazar, Melandaha Upzila, Jamalpur District	Mymensigh Division	Textile Engineering	No	link
Madaripur Textile Engineering College	MTEC		BUTEX	Madaripur, Dhaka	Dhaka Division	Textile Engineering	No	
Sylhet Textile Engineering College	STEC	2025	BUTEX	Sylhet, Dhaka	Sylhet Division	Textile Engineering	No	

=== Tangail Textile Engineering College ===
Tangail Textile Engineering College (TTEC) is a textile based research college located in Kalihati, Tangail. The institution was established in 2007. BTEC offers a four-year bachelor's degree program in textile engineering.

=== Narsingdi Textile Engineering College ===
Narsingdi Textile Engineering College(NTEC) is a controlled by Bangladesh Handloom Board and maintained by Ministry of Textiles and Jute, under the academic supervision of BUTEX.

== See also ==
- Textile schools in Bangladesh
- Tangail Textile Engineering College
- Universities in Bangladesh
- List of universities in Bangladesh
- University Grants Commission (Bangladesh)
