= Barishal Textile Engineering College =

Textile engineering college in Bangladesh

- বরিশাল টেক্সটাইল ইঞ্জিনিয়ারিং কলেজ
- Other names: BTEC
- Type: Public, Research
- Established: 1980; 46 years ago (as institute), 2010 (as college)
- Accreditation: IEB, ITET, BHB, BJRI, BGMEA, BKMEA, BTMA
- Affiliations: Ministry of Textiles and Jute
- Academic affiliations: Bangladesh University of Textiles
- Chairman: Shah Alimuzzaman
- Principal: Engr. Md. Abdul Kader Bepari
- Students: 520
- Undergraduates: 520
- Location: Barisal, Bangladesh; 22.70584°N 90.35154°E
- Campus: Suburb
- Language: English
- Education system: Coeducation
- Website: sarstec.com

Barishal Textile Engineering College , also known as BTEC, is a textile engineering college located at Barisal, Bangladesh. It is a constituent college of Bangladesh University of Textiles.

== History ==
The institution was first launched as a textile institute with the name "Institute of Textiles, Barisal" in 1980. In 2010, it went through a campus wide renovation and was renamed as a college.

After the fall of the Sheikh Hasina led Awami League government, Shahid Abdur Rab Serniabat Textile Engineering College was renamed to Barishal Textile Engineering College in February 2025.

== Academic outline ==
Barishal Textile Engineering College offers following Bachelor of Science in engineering programs, written in an alphabetic order:

1. BSc in Textile Engineering (major in Apparel Engineering)
2. BSc in Textile Engineering (major in Fabric Engineering)
3. BSc in Textile Engineering (major in Wet Process Engineering)
4. BSc in Textile Engineering (major in Yarn Engineering)

== Number of seats ==
The number of seats for the four-year bachelor's degree in textile engineering program is given below.

Number of seats as per Dept.
| Serial | Department | Seats |
| 1. | Yarn Engineering | 30 |
| 2. | Fabric Engineering | 30 |
| 3. | Wet Process Engineering | 30 |
| 4. | Apparel Engineering | 30 |
| | Total | 120 |

== Admission ==
Admission into this college is competitive and needs a high academic attainment at the SSC and HSC examination. Selection of the student for admission is made through an admission test. Only Science Students can apply for the admission test. Admission circular is published in the national dailies, college website and website of the Department of Textiles (DOT).

Department of Textiles (DOT) offers 4 years of BSc in Textile Engineering Degree. A single examination was organized by Department of Textiles (DOT) for 8 textile engineering colleges under the affiliation of Bangladesh University of Textiles (BUTEX). Colleges which conduct exams together are: CTEC (2006), PTEC (2006), TECN (2007), BTEC (2010), JTEC (2016), DWMTEC (2018), SRTEC (2021) & SHTEC (2022)

The admission test is conducted on the basis of Multiple Choice Questions (MCQ). Students have to answer Physics, Chemistry, Higher Math & English in the admission test. Students can get admission in certain college based on merit list and college preference list.

== See also ==
- List of universities in Bangladesh
- List of Islamic educational institutions
- Bangladesh Technical Education Board
- Education in Bangladesh
- Textile schools in Bangladesh
- List of colleges in Bangladesh
- Textile Engineering College, Chittagong
- Pabna Textile Engineering College
- Textile Engineering College, Noakhali
- Sheikh Kamal Textile Engineering College, Jhenaidah
- Dr. M A Wazed Miah Textile Engineering College
