= Shyamoli Textile Engineering College =

Textile versity in Shyamoli, Dhaka, Bangladesh

Shyamoli Engineering College
- শ্যামলী ইঞ্জিনিয়ারিং কলেজ
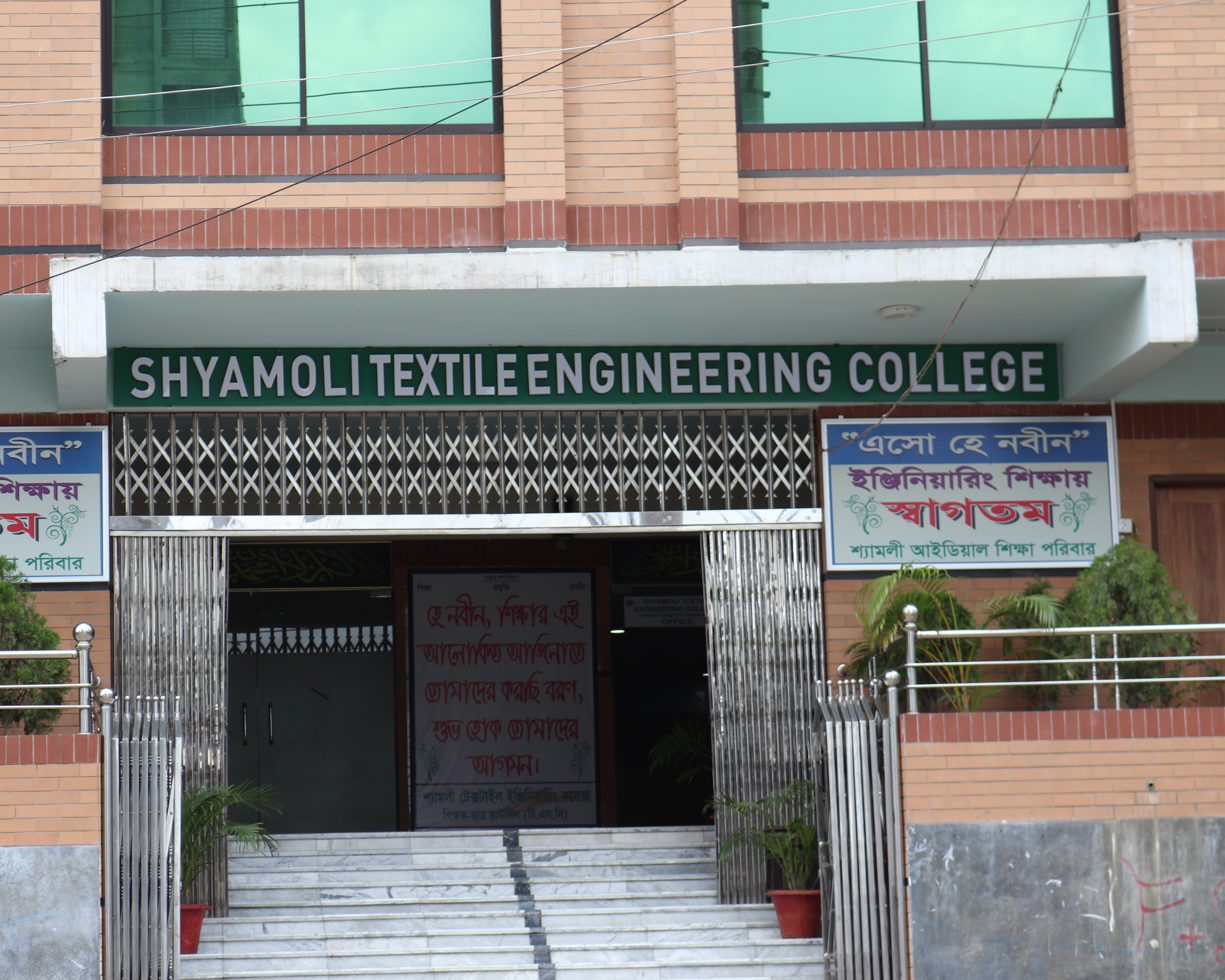
- Other names: ShEC
- Motto: শিক্ষা ও প্রযুক্তির জন্য এসো, শান্তি ও প্রযুক্তির জন্য এগিয়ে যাও!
- Motto in English: Come for education and technology, go ahead for peace and technology!
- Type: Private Engineering College
- Established: 2009; 17 years ago
- Founders: M. A. Sattar
- Accreditation: BHB, BJRI, BGMEA, BKMEA, BTMA
- Academic affiliations: University of Dhaka
- Chairman: M. A. Sattar
- Principal: Mofazzal Hossain
- Dean: Hafiz Md. Hasan Babu
- Director: Engr. Thakur Alauddin Ahmed
- Academic staff: 35
- Total staff: 55
- Students: 680
- Undergraduates: 530
- Location: 10, Chad Uddan, Road no.- 01, Mohammadpur, Dhaka, 1207, Bangladesh; 23.7558°N 90.3521°E
- Campus: Urban
- Language: English
- Website: stec.ac.bd

Shyamoli Engineering College (SEC) is one of the private engineering education schools in Bangladesh which operates under the Faculty of Engineering and Technology, University of Dhaka. Admission procedure is regulated by the university and funding is granted by the Department of Textiles, government of the People's Republic of Bangladesh.

== History ==
In 1979, Shyamoli ldeal Technical College (SITC) was established at Shyamoli to meet technical education by offering technical courses. ln order to meet the challenge of increasing demand of new sophisticated & latest technology, SITC Chairman decided to upgrade this institution to Diploma Engineering institute in 2000 to offer 4 Years Diploma in Engineering Degree by affiliation with the Bangladesh Technical Education Board and named as Shyamoli Ideal Polytechnic Institute (SIPI). To contribute to Bangladesh and World through excellence in scientific and technical education and research in the Textile sector; to serve as a valuable resource for industry and society; and remain a source of pride for all Bangladeshis, this institution was upgraded to B.Sc. Engineering College in 2009 to offer 4 Years bachelor's degree in Textile Engineering by affiliation with the University of Dhaka and named it as Shyamoli Textile Engineering College. Since then the academic curriculums are going on at full pace.

== Campus ==
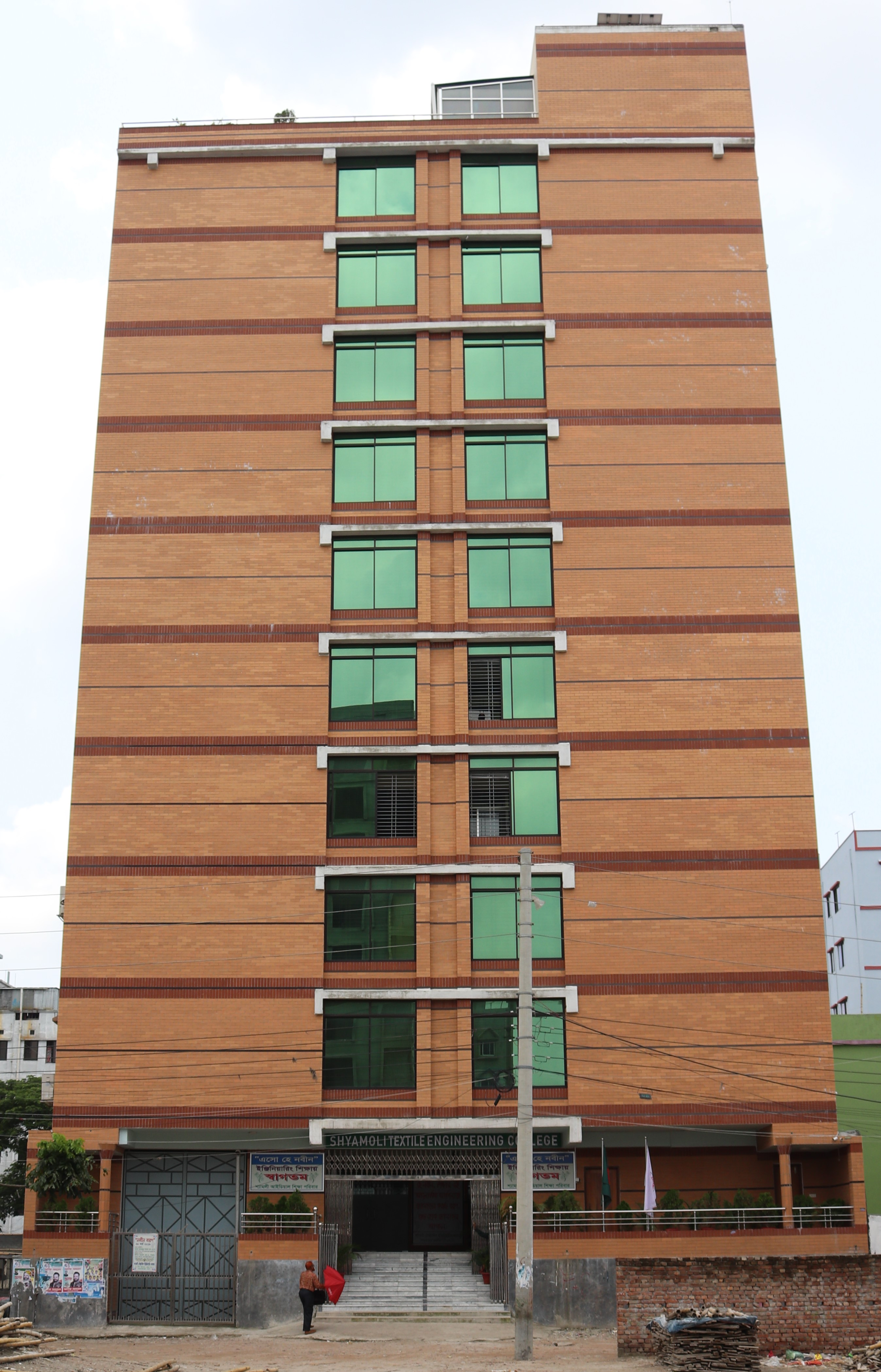
The building of Shyamoli Textile Engineering College in 2020

Shyamoli Textile Engineering College (STEC) is located at Mohammadpur in Capital City Dhaka.

It's in Chad Uddan residential area, Road-1. It's a bit remote from the urban lifestyle.

=== Accommodation ===
The STEC has a hostel facility both for boys & girls students. It has two hostel buildings of its own. Each is well furnished 4-storied building. One is dedicated for male students with canteen facility and common room. Another is for female students. Every room of the hostel has attached bath and toilet and sufficient number of furniture to accommodate students. The common room, canteen, sound and attractive atmosphere of the area is helpful for carrying out study by the students pleasantly.

== Academics ==
=== Departments ===
- Textile Engineering Departments are –
  - Department of Yarn Manufacturing Engineering (YME)
  - Department of Fabric Manufacturing Engineering (FME)
  - Department of Wet Process Engineering (WPE)
  - Department of Apparel Manufacturing Engineering (AME)
- 'Department of Computer Science and Engineering
- Department of Electrical and Electronics Engineering
- Department of Fashion Design and Apparel Engineering

=== Undergraduate courses ===
| Serial | Program Name |
|---|---|
| 01 | B.Sc. in Textile Engineering (Yarn Manufacturing Engineering) |
| 02 | B.Sc. in Textile Engineering (Fabric Manufacturing Engineering) |
| 03 | B.Sc. in Textile Engineering (Wet Process Engineering) |
| 04 | B.Sc. in Textile Engineering (Apparel Manufacturing Engineering) |
| 05 | B.Sc. in Computer Science and Engineering |
| 06 | B.Sc. in Electrical and Electronics Engineering |
| 07 | B.Sc. in Fashion Design and Apparel Engineering |

=== Medium of instruction ===
The medium of instruction is in English for all the academic students.

=== Curriculum ===
- A total of 164 credits of which the major course will be consist of 117 credits of the theoretical courses, 36 credits of practical, 9 credits of field work, industrial attachment and project and 2 credits for viva-voce. For graduation, a student has to complete all the credits according to the syllabus prescribed by the Faculty of Engineering and Technology, University of Dhaka for the session the student has been registered or admitted.

=== Admission procedures and entry requirements ===
==== Undergraduate courses ====
A candidate must have to attend the admission test given by Technology Unit of University of Dhaka to get admitted into undergraduate programme of Shyamoli Textile Engineering College. One candidate in the HSC+SSC examination should have passed with minimum GPA 6. And must have passed HSC examinatrion with physics, chemistry and mathematics as compulsory subject.

== Workshops and laboratories ==
Workshops and laboratories in Shyamoli Textile Engineering College –

1. Weaving Laboratory
2. Apparel Laboratory
3. Wet Processing Laboratory
4. Knitting Laboratory
5. Yarn Manufacturing Laboratory
6. Quality Control Laboratory
7. Mechanical Workshop
8. Computer Laboratory
9. Physics Laboratory
10. Chemistry Laboratory
11. EEE Laboratory

== Club Activities ==
Some club activities in Shyamoli Textile Engineering College:

1. STEC Tech Club
2. STEC Sports Club
3. STEC Debate Club
4. STEC Textile and Career Club
5. STEC Textile Club
6. STEC Cultural Club
7. Animation and Cinematography Enthusiast Society of STEC (ACESS)
8. STEC Computer Club
9. STEC EEE Club
