= Institution of Textile Engineers and Technologists =

Prestigious Bangladeshi fraternity

Institution of Textile Engineers and Technologists, Bangladesh
- দি ইনস্টিটিউশন অব টেক্সটাইল ইঞ্জিনিয়ার্স অ্যান্ড টেকনোলজিস্টস, বাংলাদেশ
- Logo of ITET
- Abbreviation: ITET
- Formation: August 17, 1983; 43 years ago
- Type: Nonprofit organisation
- Legal status: Professional association
- Purpose: Granting recognition and accreditation; Aiding for exchange of technical knowledge in global prospective; Arranging funds for original research work
- Professional title: Engr.
- Headquarters: House #6, Road #2, Sector #12, Uttara, Dhaka - 1230, Bangladesh
- Fields: Textile industry
- Members: 5,000 (2019)
- Official language: Bangla, English
- Convener: Engr. Ehsanul Karim Kaiser
- Co-Convener: Engr. Md. Shamsuzzaman, CIP
- Co-Convener: Engr. ATM Shamsu Uddin Khan
- Member Secretary: Engr. Md. Enayet Hossain
- Board of directors: Central executive committee
- Main organ: Council
- Parent organization: Institution of Engineers, Bangladesh
- Affiliations: BUTEX, NITER, DUET, KUET, JUST, MBSTU, TTEC, CTEC, RTEC, TECN, PTEC, BTEC, JTEC, JTEC, GTEC, University Grants Commission (Bangladesh), Ministry of Education (Bangladesh), Ministry of Textiles and Jute, Department of Textiles (Bangladesh)

The Institution of Textile Engineers and Technologists, simply known as ITET, is a Bangladeshi professional organisation of technical personnels with institutional qualifications in textiles education. It is the oldest and most influential of its kind in the country. It works as an umbrella for all textile engineers and technicians actively working in the textile industry of Bangladesh.

The organisation has its headquarters at Uttara sector in Dhaka City. It holds strong affiliation with the Textile Engineering Division of IEB. Department of Textiles of the government of the People's Republic of Bangladesh frequently takes advice and suggestions of this professionals' association to its consideration for the continuous growth of the industry. As of 31 October 2024, ITET, Bangladesh-14th Central Council was declared dissolved with resignation. An interim convening committee has been formed to restore the tradition of ITET and conduct a constructive election with the participation of all, determine the course of action according to the needs of the members and reform it. Engineer Ehsanul Karim Kaiser became the convener. Moreover, Engineer Md. Shamsuzzaman CIP and Engineer ATM Shamsu Uddin Khan became the co-conveners and Engineer Md. Enayet Hossain became the member secretary.

Organizers were appointed to encourage member participation in ITET's activities. To continue earlier work and address pressing issues, seven more standing committees were formed: Finance, Membership, Seminar, Innovation and Skill Development, Social Welfare and Event Management, Press and Publications, Sports & Cultural, and Office Management, with the aim of reforming ITET.
