= Directorate General of Jute (Bangladesh) =

State industrial regulatory authority

- পাট অধিদপ্তর
- Formation: 1978
- Founder: Government of Bangladesh
- Type: Government agency
- Purpose: Monitoring of jute industry in Bangladesh
- Headquarters: 99, Motijheel Commercial Area, Dhaka 1000, Bangladesh
- Region served: People's Republic of Bangladesh
- Official language: Bengali
- Director General: Mohammad Ataur Rahman
- Parent organization: Ministry of Textiles and Jute
- Subsidiaries: Bangladesh Jute Research Institute; Bangladesh Jute Mills Corporation
- Affiliations: BUTEX; Bangladesh Agricultural University
- Website: dgjute.gov.bd

The Directorate General of Jute (Bengali: পাট অধিদপ্তর) is Bangladesh's governmental regulatory agency under its ministry of textiles and jute which is responsible for the growth and expansion of its jute industry.

Its function is to work in collaboration with various research institutes, colleges and universities throughout the country to achieve advancement in jute production and diversification of jute based products.

== History ==
The directorate general was formed in 1978, following the merger of two former ministries, "Ministry of Textiles" and "Ministry of Jute", which resulted into one cognitive state regulatory authority.
