= Jhenaidah Textile Engineering College =

Public Textile Engineering College in Bangladesh

Jhenaidah Textile Engineering College (JTEC)
- ঝিনাইদহ টেক্সটাইল ইঞ্জিনিয়ার কলেজ
- Former name: Sheikh Kamal Textile Engineering College
- Motto: We create the engineers who build the nation
- Type: Public, Research
- Established: 2018
- Parent institution: Bangladesh University of Textiles
- Accreditation: IEB, ITET, BHB, BJRI, BGMEA, BKMEA, BTMA
- Affiliations: Ministry of Textiles and Jute; Department of Textiles
- Chairman: Shah Alimuzzaman
- Principal: Firoz Khandaker
- Students: 400+
- Location: Jhenaidah, 8300, Bangladesh; 23.5415°N 89.2338°E
- Website: www.sktecjhenaidah.com

Jhenaidah Textile Engineering College is an undergraduate public engineering college located in the Jhenaidah district of the Khulna Division of Bangladesh. The college offers four year BSc Engineering degree under Bangladesh Textile University. In the 2017–18 academic year, the college started its academic activities in BSc Engineering in Textile Engineering.

== History ==
It was originally named Sheikh Kamal Textile Engineering College. It was renamed to Jhenaidah Textile Engineering College, Jhenaidah in February 2025 after the fall of the Sheikh Hasina led Awami League government.

== Academics ==
JTEC offers a four-year B.Sc. in Textile Engineering under the Faculty of Textiles of Bangladesh University of Textiles (BUTEX). The departments of the college are given below:

- Department of Yarn Engineering
- Department of Fabric Engineering
- Department of Wet Process Engineering
- Department of Apparel Engineering

== Number of seats ==
The number of seats for the four-year bachelor's degree in textile engineering program is given below.

Number of seats as per dept.
Department	Seats
Yarn Engineering	30
Fabric Engineering	30
Wet Process Engineering	30
Apparel Engineering	30
Total	120

== Alumni ==
JTECAA is the "official alumni body Jhenaidah Textile Engineering College" with 115 registered students and alumni.

== See also ==
- Education in Bangladesh
- Textile schools in Bangladesh
- List of colleges in Bangladesh
