= Killing of Abu Bakar Siddique =

2010 crime at the University of Dhaka, Bangladesh

Murder of Abu Bakar Siddique
- Part of Violence of Bangladesh Chhatra League
- Location: University of Dhaka
- Date: February 3, 2010; Night
- Target: Abu Bakr
- Attack type: Attack, Shooting
- Deaths: 1 person
- Injuries: 30 people
- Victim: Abu Bakar Siddique
- Perpetrators: Saiduzzaman Faruq; Mofidul Alam Khan Tapu and others
- No. of participants: 6–10 people
- Motive: Control of residence hall, power struggle

The killing of Abu Bakar Siddique took place in 2010, in the context of a power struggle among activists of the Bangladesh Chhatra League. Abu Bakar was a third-year student in the Department of Islamic History and Culture at the University of Dhaka. He had secured first place in his department up to his second year and also held the record for the highest results in the department’s history. On February 1, 2010, he was injured during a clash between two factions of the Chhatra League over seat allocation at Sir AF Rahman Hall.

He died on February 3 while receiving treatment at Dhaka Medical College and Hospital. A five-member investigation committee was formed led by Professor Md. Abul Kashem to look into the incident. After the investigation, the university authorities temporarily suspended 10 Chhatra League members who were accused.

== Background ==
=== About Abu Bakar ===
Abu Bakar was a student in the Department of Islamic History and Culture at the University of Dhaka. He was a resident of room 404 at Sir AF Rahman Hall. His home was in Golabari village, Madhupur Upazila, Tangail District. His father, Rustam Ali, was a day laborer and the family lived in poverty. During university breaks, Abu Bakar worked in the fields and also gave tuition to support his own education. He scored 3.75 out of 4 in his third semester exams and was able to take part in the fourth semester exams. On February 3, 2010, he was killed in a violent clash and shooting between two armed Chhatra League groups at his residence hall. Forty-two days later, on March 14, his exam results were published, and he was ranked joint first. This was the best academic result in the department’s history.

=== The Murder ===
On the night of February 1, 2010, a fierce clash and gunfight broke out at Sir AF Rahman Hall between the group led by president Saiduzzaman Faruq and the group led by general secretary Mehedi Hasan Molla. The two groups of Chhatra League fought over control of hall seats and a multi-crore taka tender for two new university dormitories. During the shooting, Abu Bakar was either shot in the head or received a severe blow, leaving him critically injured. Thirty others, including other Chhatra League members and general students, were also injured. Abu Bakar was admitted to Dhaka Medical College Hospital, where he died while receiving treatment. The autopsy report stated that he died due to a heavy blunt force injury to the back of his head.

== The Case ==
After the murder, Omar Faruk, a resident of the same hall, filed a murder case at Shahbagh Police Station. After 14 months of investigation, on April 29, 2011, police submitted a chargesheet against eight people, including then hall president Saiduzzaman Faruq. CID officer Md. Abdul Halim later submitted a supplementary charge sheet. When the case stalled, the plaintiff expressed distrust towards the police and appealed for the case to be transferred to court. After reviewing the situation, the court handed over the investigation to the CID. After their investigation, on November 26, 2012, CID submitted another charge sheet including two more names, bringing the total to ten accused. All the accused were leaders or active members of the Chhatra League.

=== List of Accused ===
List of the accused in the Abu Bakar murder case
Name	Position in Chhatra League	Residence Hall	Legal Status	University Administration
Saiduzzaman Faruq	President, Sir AF Rahman Hall	Sir AF Rahman Hall	Acquitted	Temporarily suspended
Mofidul Alam Khan Tapu	Chhatra League activist	Sir AF Rahman Hall	Acquitted	Temporarily suspended
Rakib Uddin Rafiq	Chhatra League activist	Sir AF Rahman Hall	Acquitted	Temporarily suspended
Mansur Ahmed Roni	Chhatra League activist	Sir AF Rahman Hall	Acquitted	Temporarily suspended
Asaduzzaman Jony	Chhatra League activist	Sir AF Rahman Hall	Acquitted	Temporarily suspended
Alam-e Julhas	Chhatra League activist	Sir AF Rahman Hall	Acquitted	Temporarily suspended
Tauhidul Islam Tushar	Chhatra League activist	Sir AF Rahman Hall	Acquitted	Temporarily suspended
Abu Zafar Md. Salam	Chhatra League activist	Sir AF Rahman Hall	Acquitted	Temporarily suspended
Enamul Haque Ershad	Chhatra League activist	Sir AF Rahman Hall	Acquitted	Temporarily suspended
Mehedi Hasan Liyon	Chhatra League activist	Sir AF Rahman Hall	Acquitted	Temporarily suspended

=== Investigation of the Case ===
This murder case was investigated by four different police officers, one after another. The initial case report stated that Abu Bakar died from gunshot wounds. The first investigating officer, Inspector Emdadul Haque, claimed that Abu Bakar died from a bullet fired by Chhatra League president Saiduzzaman. The next investigating officer, Rezaul Karim, was the officer-in-charge at Shahbagh Police Station at the time. He said that on the day of the incident, he went to AF Rahman Hall with a team of 20 to 25 policemen. They used tear gas shells to disperse the students. He also said that they fired tear gas shells under his command.

However, the court noted that no tear gas shell casings or blunt weapons were seized from the scene, nor were any efforts made to find them. Instead, the police only submitted Abu Bakar’s bloodstained lungi as evidence. The government lawyer led the prosecution. A total of 22 witnesses were called for the prosecution. Of these, 11 eyewitnesses stated that Abu Bakar died from being hit by a police-fired tear gas shell. CID officer Md. Abdul Halim was also a witness, but he did not attend the hearing, citing personal reasons.

=== Verdict of the Case ===
On May 7, 2017, Dhaka’s Additional Metropolitan Sessions Judge Md. Zahidul Kabir delivered the final verdict in this case. Referring to the autopsy report, he said that Abu Bakar died from a heavy blow to the back of his head by a blunt weapon. The court’s verdict acquitted all 10 Chhatra League leaders and activists. After the verdict was announced, the family of the victim was not informed about the outcome. In fact, it was only eight months after the incident that the verdict was reported in the media. Because of this, the victim’s family could not file an appeal against the verdict within the required timeframe. In response, then Law Minister Anisul Huq said, "I will investigate why no appeal was filed against the acquittal verdict and will take necessary legal action as soon as possible."

When the court granted bail to everyone, the main accused, Saiduzzaman Faruq, was asked, “Who killed Abu Bakar?” He replied:

Only Allah knows who killed him!

After learning of the verdict, then Vice-Chancellor A. A. M. S. Arefin Siddique appealed for the intervention of the higher court and said,

It is very unfortunate that the accused have been acquitted. The real killer of Abu Bakr needs to be found.

Hearing the verdict, Abu Bakar’s mother expressed her sorrow and said,

Those who killed my innocent son were not brought to justice! What kind of country is this?

=== After the July Uprising ===
On March 2, 2010, at a Dhaka University Syndicate meeting, 10 students were temporarily expelled from the university. However, two of the expelled students filed separate writ petitions in the High Court challenging the university’s expulsion order. As a result, in 2012, the High Court Division declared the expulsion orders invalid. After the July Revolution, on January 1, 2025, a decision was made to appeal the High Court’s judgment in the higher court.

== Protests ==
Abu Bakar’s death sparked intense protests and agitation among general students at DU. Outraged students vandalized the proctor’s office and marched on campus. They blamed the Bangladesh Chhatra League for the murder. In 2019, after the verdict was made public, DU Vice-Chancellor Mohammed Akhtaruzzaman said that the university would take all necessary steps to ensure justice.

Former Law Minister Shafique Ahmed said that it is the police’s responsibility to bring Abu Bakar’s killers to justice. It is the prosecution’s responsibility to prove the allegations in court. If the verdict shows any negligence in the investigation, then the concerned police officers should be held accountable.

Supreme Court lawyer Jyotirmoy Barua said, “The state prosecutor failed seriously in carrying out his duty. This public prosecutor must be held accountable. He should have appealed against the verdict in the High Court within the required time, but he did not.”

On September 11, 2024, Abu Bakar Smriti Sangsad organized a human chain with his family members. Under the banner of students, teachers, and the public, they demanded a retrial of the murder case.

== Legacy ==
After the July Uprising, in 2025, a memorial meeting and prayer were jointly organized at Sir AF Rahman Hall by the Shahid Abu Bakar Smriti Sangsad and hall authorities. On February 4, 2025, the National Revolutionary Council (জাতীয় বিপ্লবী পরিষদ) held a press conference at Dhaka University’s Madhur Canteen, demanding a retrial of the murder verdict.

== See also ==
- Guest room (Bangladesh)
- Criticism of Awami League
