= Jute Diversification Promotion Centre =

Research institute in Bangladesh

- Formation: 2002
- Headquarters: Dhaka, Bangladesh
- Region served: Bangladesh
- Official language: Bengali
- Website: Jute Diversification Promotion Centre

Jute Diversification Promotion Centre is an autonomous government body responsible for the promotion and diversification of Jute use in Bangladesh and is located in Dhaka, Bangladesh. Nasima Begum is the executive director of the centre. The centre organises jute fairs in Bangladesh.

== History ==
Jute historically has been an important industry in Bangladesh. The proposal for a jute diversification center was brought up in the International Forum for diversification of jute uses. In 2002 the Jute Diversification Promotion Centre was established by the Ministry of Textiles and Jute. It is headquartered in the former headquarters of the International Jute Study Group in Dhaka. It has jute entrepreneurial service centres in Chittagong, Dhaka, Jessore, Narsigndi, Rangpur, and Tangail. The centre is part of a government strategy to diversify jute products and promote exports of jute.
