= Tangail Textile Engineering College =

Government college in Banglasesh

- টাঙ্গাইল টেক্সটাইল ইঞ্জিনিয়ারিং কলেজ
- Former name: Bangladesh Institute of Textile Technology - BITT
- Type: Public, Research
- Established: 2007; 19 years ago
- Academic affiliations: Bangladesh University of Textiles
- Endowment: Ministry of Textiles and Jute
- Chairman: Shah Alimuzzaman
- Principal: Bokhtiar Hossain
- Academic staff: 45
- Administrative staff: 14
- Students: 420
- Undergraduates: 420
- Location: Baghutia,Dhunail, Kalihati, 1970, Bangladesh; 24.3759°N 89.9693°E
- Campus: 11.5 acres (4.7 ha); Suburban
- Language: English
- Website: ttec

Tangail Textile Engineering College (TTEC) is a textile based research college located in Kalihati, Tangail. The college is academically operated by BUTEX and was previously affiliated with University of Dhaka under its faculty of science and engineering for nine years. It is one of the seven textile engineering colleges of Bangladesh which are collectively funded and controlled by the Directorate of Textiles, Ministry of Textiles and Jute.

== History ==
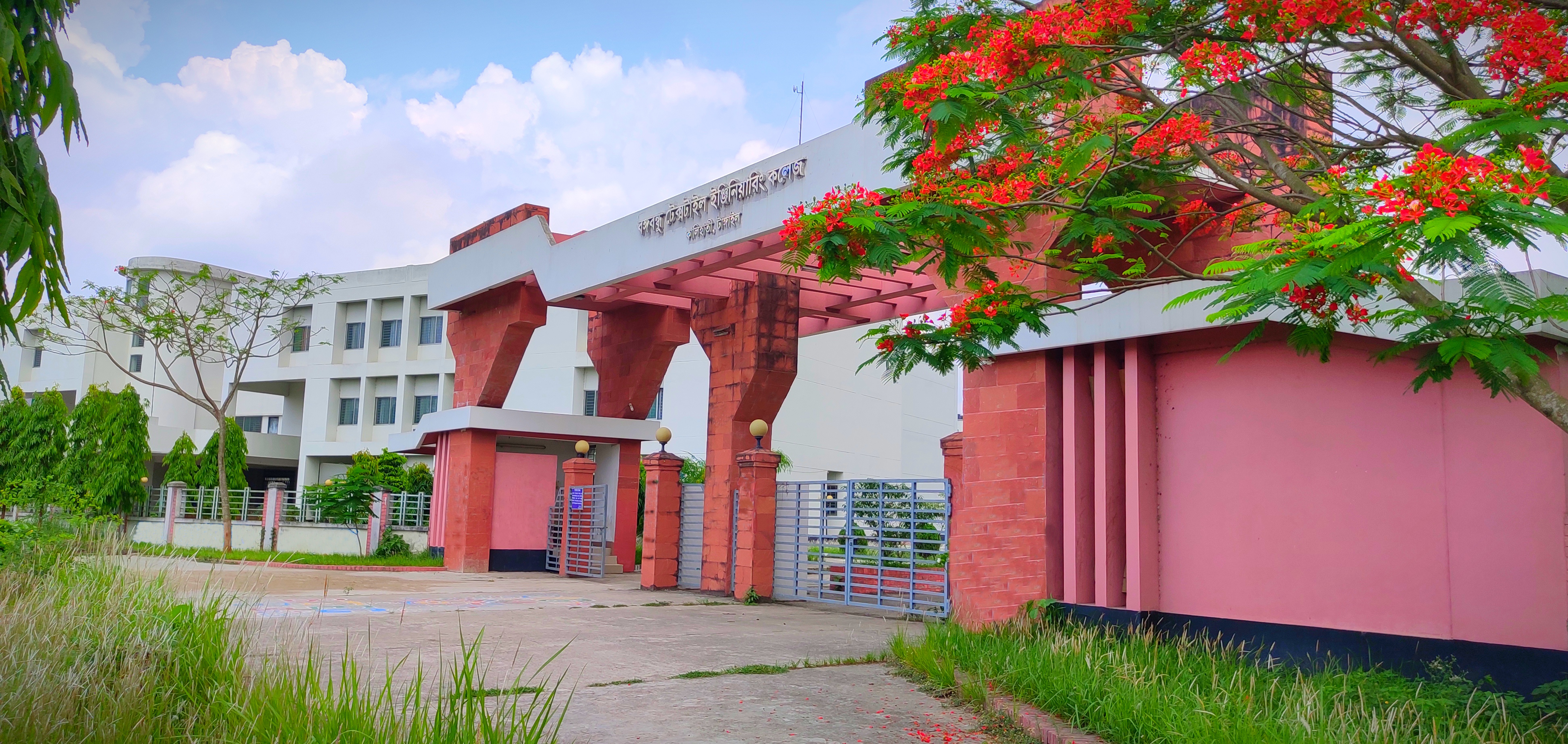
Main gate

The institution was established in 2007 as the Bangladesh Institute of Textile Technology (BITT) on a temporary campus at Textile Institute, Tangail. The college took its current name in 2010. The foundation stone for a permanent campus at Kalihati was laid in January 2011. Instruction at the permanent campus began in February 2014.

As of 2016, only half of the teaching positions at BTEC had been filled. Laboratory equipment could not be run because of the lack of skilled operators and inadequate quantities of raw materials.

After the fall of the Sheikh Hasina led Awami League government, Bangabandhu Textile Engineering College was renamed to Tangail Textile Engineering College in February 2025.

== Campus ==
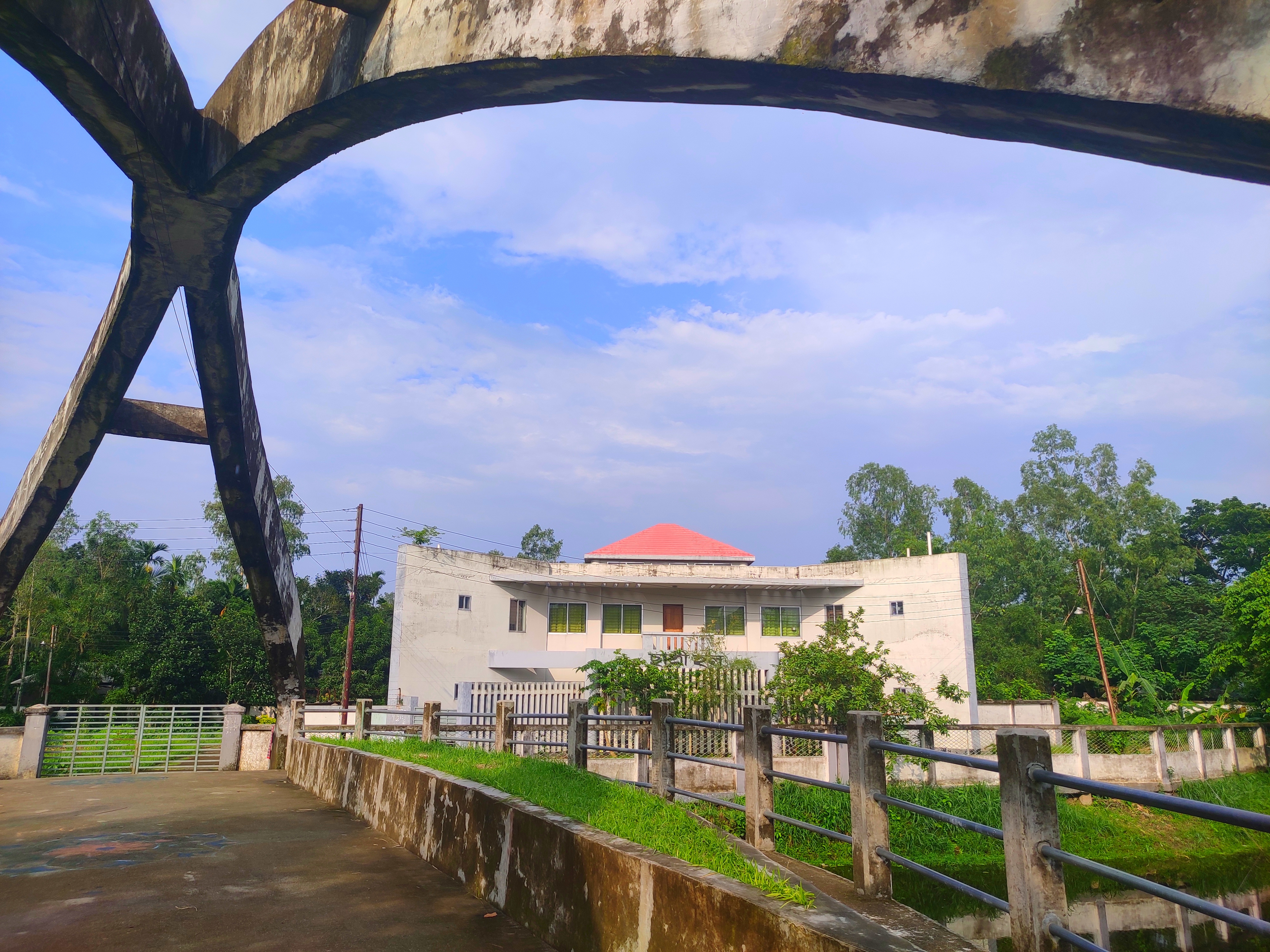
BTEC Girls Resident Hall, across bridge over canal

The campus is located approximately 3 kilometres (1.9 mi) southwest of Kalihati, on the north side of the Joydebpur–Jamalpur Highway. The college grounds are split into two unequal parts by a north-south canal connected to the Jhinai River. Most buildings are on the larger, western, portion of the site.

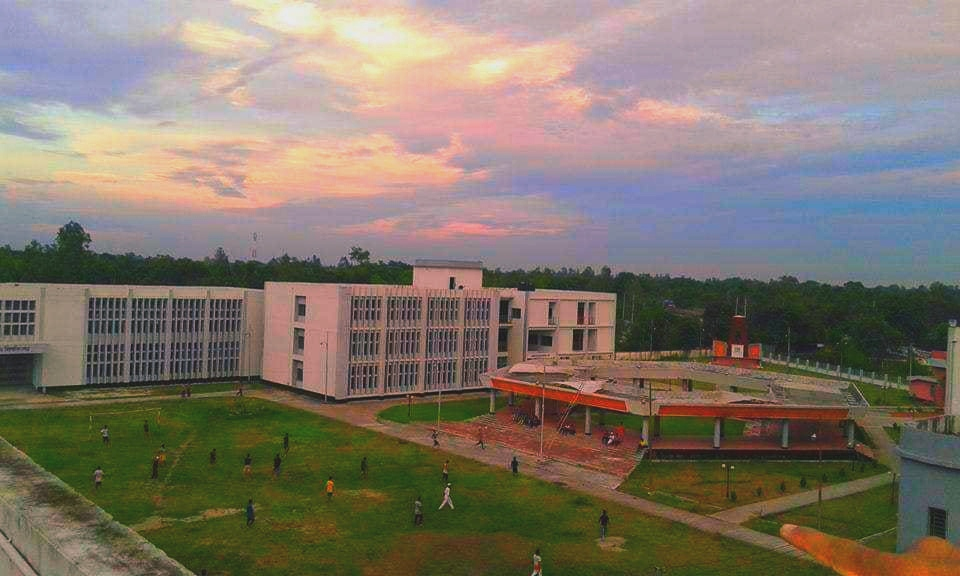
Playing field and six-point courtyard

The entrance gate leads to a courtyard occupied by a covered ring structure in the shape of a hexagon, 20 metres (66 ft) on a side, elevated on a base 0.75 metres (2 ft 6 in) high. Designed by Siraj Tarekul Islam, it commemorates the six point movement, a milestone on the road to Bangladesh's independence. Around the edges of the roof are terracotta panels created by Syed Saiful Kabir Ranju of the Institute of Fine Arts, University of Chittagong. It was built in 2014.

== Academics ==
BTEC offers a four-year bachelor's degree program in textile engineering. Initially, the degree was in affiliation with the University of Dhaka. Since the 2016-2017 academic year, it has been in affiliation with the Bangladesh University of Textiles.

- Faculty of Fashion Design and Apparel Engineering:
  - Department of Apparel Engineering
- Faculty of Textile Chemical Engineering:
  - Department of Wet Process Engineering
- Faculty of Textile Engineering:
  - Department of Fabric Engineering
  - Department of Yarn Engineering

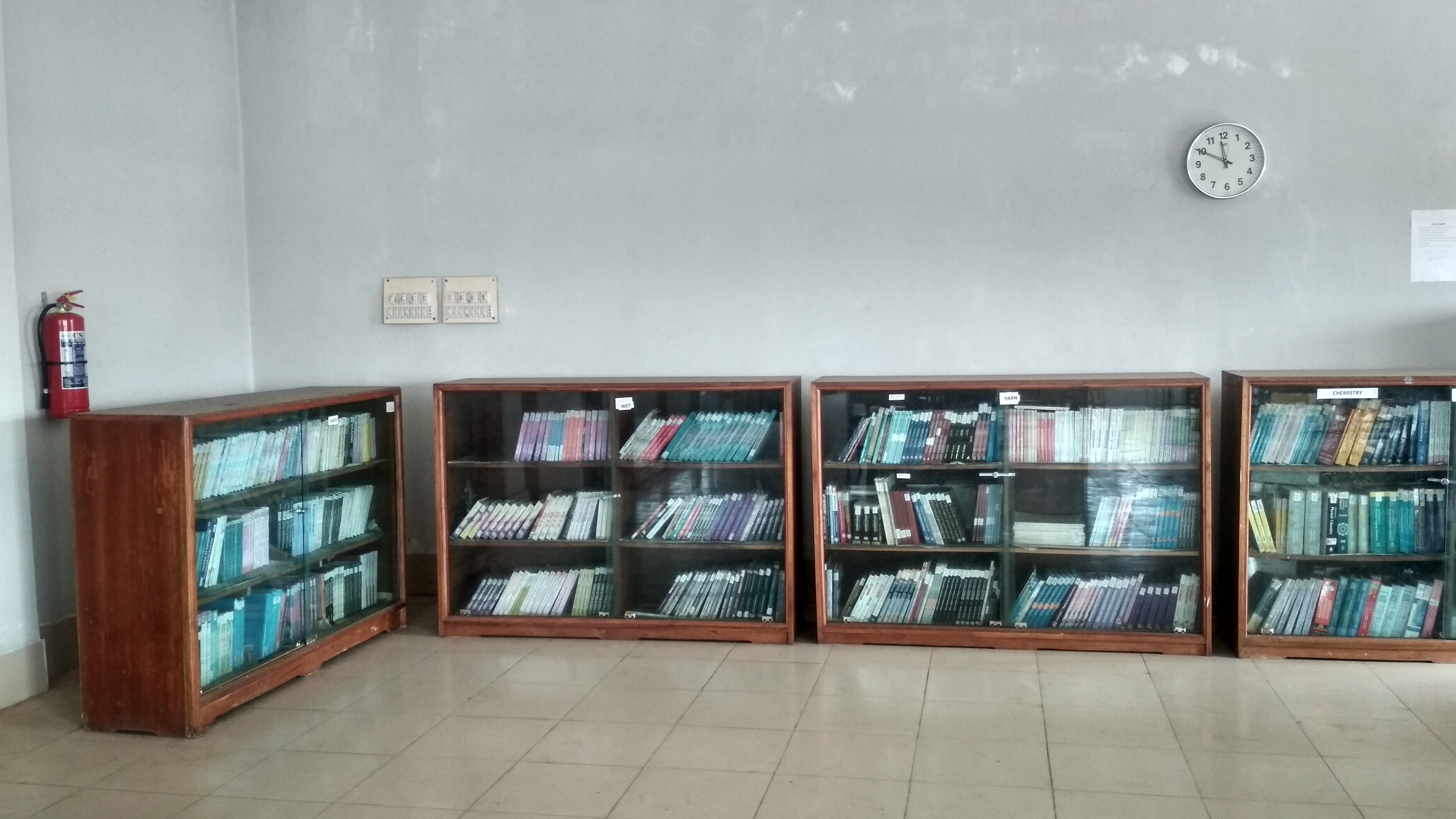
Library

== Number of seats ==
The number of seats for 4-year bachelor's degree in textile engineering programmes is given below:

| Serial | Department | Seats |
|---|---|---|
| 1. | Apparel Engineering | 30 |
| 2. | Fabric Engineering | 30 |
| 3. | Wet Process Engineering | 30 |
| 4. | Yarn Engineering | 30 |
| | Total | 120 |

== See also ==
- National Institute of Textile Engineering and Research
