= Textile management =

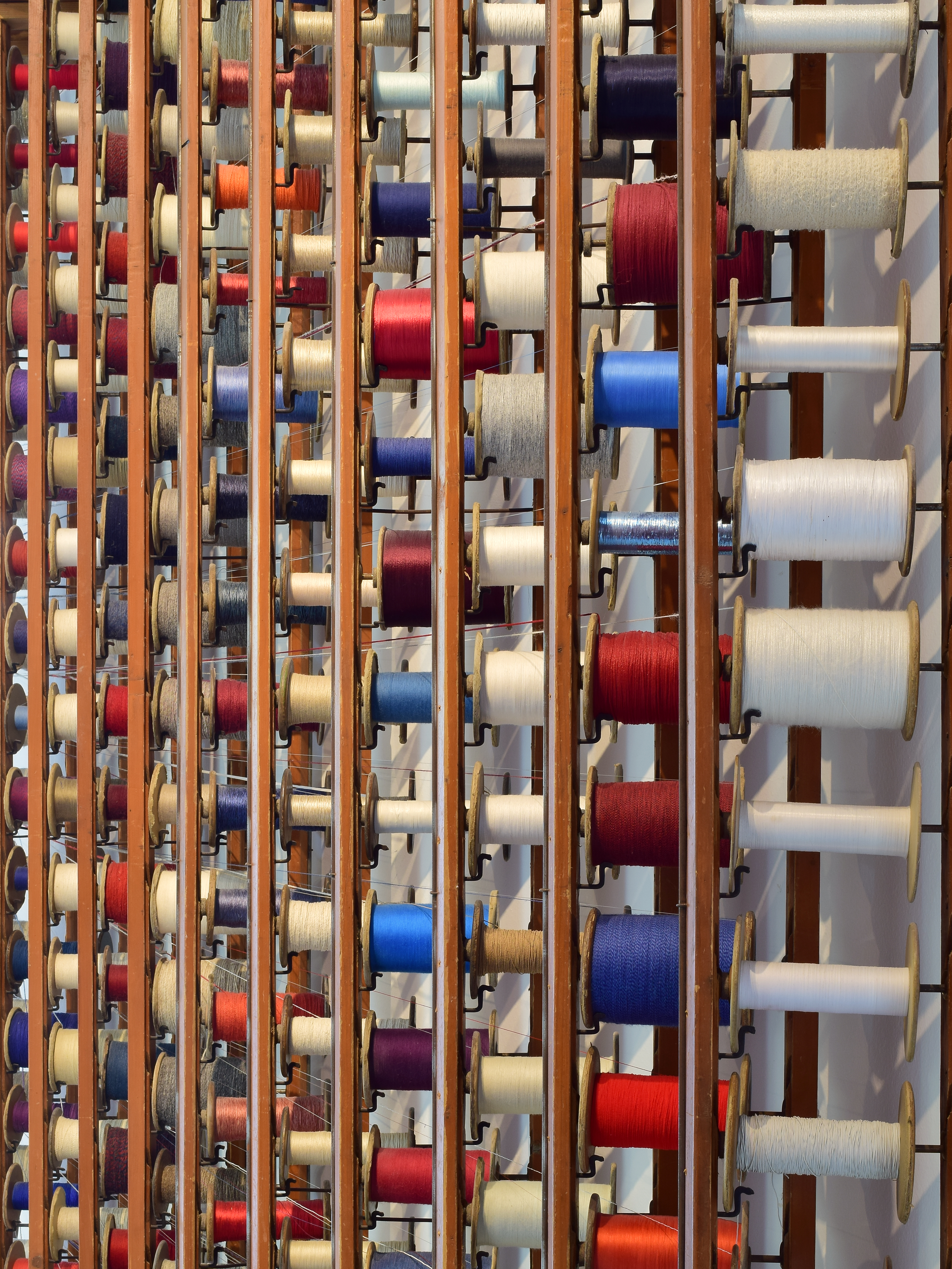
Rolls of coloured yarn: elements in the supply chain in the textile industry

Textile management is an interdisciplinary research subject where management issues in the textile and fashion industry (i.e. the value chain of textile products from concept to customer) are studied. Textile management can be described as studies of practices related to the textile and fashion industry, including studies of the organization and management of textile and fashion-related supply and demand chains, including design and product design, product development, production and manufacturing processes, procurement, distribution and logistics, marketing, market communication and merchandising, retailing, consumer analyses, consumer behaviour, sustainability etc. The reverse flow is also addressed, the aim of which is to recreate lost value, such as returns management, organization of recycling and reuse, etc.

Researchers within Textile management have different backgrounds and the diversity mirrors the wide range of perspectives. Thus, Textile management is a multi- and interdisciplinary research area, i.e. a cluster of fields, which borrows different theoretical lenses and uses them in an applied setting. Researchers study different phenomena, from entrepreneurship and innovation to integration of sustainability within the industry and local production of fashion. The diversity is also mirrored in used research methods and views of knowledge. Qualitative methods (e.g. to understand ethics and moral within supply chains and local, slow production) as well as quantitative methods (e.g. to develop traceability systems).

The discipline of Textile Management and related subjects (i.e. Textile and Apparel Management (TAM) and Fashion management) is a world wide area of education that, along similar lines, focuses on the study of textile & fashion businesses and value chains, entrepreneurship and consumers. There are educations at both bachelor (B. Sc), master (M. Sc.) as well as Doctor of Philosophy (Ph. D) levels in different countries such as Sweden, France, Romania, USA and UK.
