= NTEC =

NTEC or NTec may refer to:

- National Technical Education Certificate, Bruneian vocational qualification
- Navajo Transitional Energy Company, coal power company of the Navajo Nation in New Mexico, United States
- New Territories East Cluster, hospital cluster under the Hospital Authority in Hong Kong
- Northern Territory Electoral Commission, Australian electoral commission
