= Md. Abul Kashem =

Bangladeshi Academic

Md. Abul Kashem is a Bangladeshi academic and the former vice-chancellor of the Bangladesh University of Textiles.

== Early life ==
Kashem completed his undergraduate degree at the College of Textile Technology in 1978. He completed his master's degree at a university in the United Kingdom in 1988.

== Career ==
Kashem joined the technical department of the College of Textile Technology as a lecturer.

Kashem was promoted to full professor in 2007 and was appointed acting principal of the College of Textile Technology (upgraded to Bangladesh University of Textiles in 2010).

From 2009 to 2014, Kashem was the chairman of the Bangladesh Technical Education Board. From 2011 to 2012, he was the additional director general of the Directorate of Technical Education.

Kashem was the head of the department of apparel engineering at the Bangladesh University of Textiles. In February 2019, he was appointed the vice-chancellor of Bangladesh University of Textiles by President Mohammad Abdul Hamid. Kashem requested students of the university who blocked roads in January 2022 demanding online exams during the COVID-19 pandemic in Bangladesh to end their protests. He is one of two vice chancellors of public universities in Bangladesh without a PhD, the other is Farid Uddin Ahmed.

In 2023, Shah Alimuzzaman Belal was appointed vice-chancellor of Bangladesh University of Textiles replacing Kashem.
