= Institute of Science, Trade and Technology =

Higher educational institution in Bangladesh

Institute of Science Trade & Technology
- Type: Private Research Institute
- Established: 1998
- Affiliations: National University of Bangladesh, Bangladesh Technical Education Board
- Chairman: Mst. Elora Parvin
- Principal: Md Morshed Alam
- Location: Dhaka, Bangladesh
- Language: English
- Website: istt.edu.bd

The Institute of Science Trade and Technology (ISTT) is a professional and technical based higher educational institution in Bangladesh. It is an affiliated Institute of National University of Bangladesh.

== Academic policy ==
=== Basic Foundation Courses ===
The institute takes initiative to offer a Basic Foundation Course for admitted student with free of cost. Basic Foundation Course includes Basic Mathematics, Fundamental English, Fundamentals of Computer, Statistics and or Accounting courses to enhance the basic knowledge so that they could coup up the Academic course easily. The duration of BFC is 2 Month. Every student must have attained the Prerequisite BFC course. Without the completion of the prerequisite course(s), students will not be allowed to register course(s).

Change of program/department

Students may change his/her program/Department by submitting written requests to the Concerned Heads of the Departments. If permitted by the Heads of the Departments, the Registrar's Office will take the necessary change to the student's record.

Thesis/project/internship

Undergraduate or Graduate students must have submit Project/Thesis paper as notified by the department of the institute. It is mentionable that no chance of improvement would be given for Project/Thesis. Internship/ Project/Thesis fees will be applicable in this regard.

Period of time for completion of degree

The maximum allowable time for completion of any undergraduate degree will be 6 (six) years’, for any graduate degree 3 (four) years’, and for any 4 years’ diploma degree it is 6 years’.

== Departments ==
- Department of Computer Science & Engineering.
- Department of Electronics Communication & Engineering.
- Department of Textile Engineering
- Department of Bachelor of Business Administration.

== Campus ==
Permanent Campus(in 1 Accor of Land)	Plot# 1/9, Block# D, Section# 15, Mirpur, Dhaka. (School of Technology is operating)
