= National Institute of Textile Engineering and Research =

Textile school in Bangladesh

National Institute of Textile Engineering and Research - NITER
- ন্যাশনাল ইনস্টিটিউট অফ টেক্সটাইল ইঞ্জিনিয়ারিং এন্ড রিসার্চ - নিটার
- Other name: NITER
- Former names: Textile Industry Development Center (TIDC), NITTRAD
- Type: Public–private partnership (PPP)
- Established: 1979 as TIDC and Transformed to current form in 2009
- Founder: Government of Bangladesh
- Academic affiliations: University of Dhaka
- Chancellor: Mirza Fakhrul Islam Alamgir
- Vice-Chancellor: Niaz Ahmed Khan
- Dean: Upama Kabir
- Director: Ashequl Alam Rana
- Academic staff: 106
- Students: 2000+
- Undergraduates: 1909
- Postgraduates: 103
- Location: Nayarhat, Kohinoor Gate, Savar, Dhaka District, 1350, Bangladesh; 23.9157°N 90.2356°E
- Campus: Urban 17.7 acres (7.2 ha)
- Language: English
- Colors: purple and white
- Website: niter.edu.bd

The National Institute of Textile Engineering and Research (Bengali: ন্যাশনাল ইনস্টিটিউট অফ টেক্সটাইল ইঞ্জিনিয়ারিং এন্ড রিসার্চ), also known as NITER, is one of the largest undergraduate textile engineering campuses in Bangladesh. It is located in Savar, Dhaka District.

The institute is a partnership between the Bangladesh Textile Mills Association (BTMA) and the Ministry of Textiles and Jute, Government of Bangladesh. It is a public-private partnership education and research organization and a constituent institute of the University of Dhaka.

== History ==
In the late 1970s, the public textile mills under the Bangladesh Textile Mills Corporation (BTMC) were operating at a loss. BTMC knew it needed skilled personnel to turn the mills around. To that end, and to serve the mills' testing and consulting needs, in 1979 it established a training institute at Savar, the Textile Industry Development Centre (TIDC). For the first five years, the United Nations Development Programme (UNDP), through the United Nations Industrial Development Organization (UNIDO), supported infrastructure, curriculum development, and staff training at TIDC.

In 1994 TIDC's name changed to National Institute of Textile Training Research and Design (NITTRAD). Later the Ministry of Textiles and Jute decided to run NITTRAD under public–private partnership (PPP) and handed over its operational management to Bangladesh Textile Mills Association (BTMA) under the Ministry of Textile and Jute. From 1 January 2013, the Ministry of Textiles and Jute, according to a suggestion from the University of Dhaka, changed the name of the institute to National Institute of Textile Engineering and Research. From 2010 to 2011 session NITER started Bachelor of Science in Textile engineering course under the University of Dhaka. It was initiated by the then president of BTMA, Abdul Hai Sarkar.

It also provides practical and training classes of textile engineering to students of private universities in Bangladesh.

== Academic ==
Undergraduate programs:

- B.Sc. in Textile Engineering(TE)
- B.Sc. in Industrial and Production Engineering (IPE)
- B.Sc. in Fashion Design and Apparel Engineering (FDAE)
- B.Sc. in Computer Science and Engineering (CSE)
- B.Sc. in Electrical and Electronics Engineering (EEE)

Postgraduate programs:

- M.Sc. in Textile Engineering
- MBA in Textile & Apparel Value Chain

== Collaboration ==
NITER has entered into academic and research collaborations with following institutes:

- Wuhan Textile University, China
- University of Bolton, United Kingdom
- Hochschule Niederrhein, University of Applied Sciences, Germany
- UNIDO
- Deutsche Gesellschaft für Internationale Zusammenarbeit (GIZ)
