= Wet process engineering =

Major stream in textile engineering

Wet Processing Engineering is one of the major streams in Textile Engineering or Textile manufacturing which refers to the engineering of textile chemical processes and associated applied science. The other three streams in textile engineering are yarn engineering, fabric engineering, and apparel engineering. The processes of this stream are involved or carried out in an aqueous stage. Hence, it is called a wet process which usually covers pre-treatment, dyeing, printing, and finishing.

The wet process is usually done in the manufactured assembly of interlacing fibers, filaments and yarns, having a substantial surface (planar) area in relation to its thickness, and adequate mechanical strength giving it a cohesive structure. In other words, the wet process is done on manufactured fiber, yarn and fabric.

All of these stages require an aqueous medium which is created by water. A massive amount of water is required in these processes per day. It is estimated that, on an average, almost 50–100 liters of water is used to process only 1 kilogram of textile goods, depending on the process engineering and applications. Water can be of various qualities and attributes. Not all water can be used in the textile processes; it must have some certain properties, quality, color and attributes of being used. This is the reason why water is a prime concern in wet processing engineering.

== Water ==
Water consumption and discharge of wastewater are the two major concerns. The textile industry uses a large amount of water in its varied processes especially in wet operations such as pre-treatment, dyeing, and printing. Water is required as a solvent of various dyes and chemicals and it is used in washing or rinsing baths in different steps. Water consumption depends upon the application methods, processes, dyestuffs, equipment/machines and technology which may vary mill to mill and material composition. Longer processing sequences, processing of extra dark colors and reprocessing lead to extra water consumption. And process optimization and right first-time production may save much water.

- Fresh water: Most water used in the textile industry is from deep well water which is found 800 ft below the surface level. The main problem which is concerned with using water in textile processes is water hardness caused by the presence of soluble salts of metals including calcium and magnesium. Iron, aluminum, and copper salts may also contribute to the hardness, but their effects are much less. Using hard water in the wet process can cause problems such as the formation of scale in boilers, reactions with soap and detergents, reaction with dyes, and problems due to Iron.

Water hardness can be removed by the boiling process, liming process, sodalime process, base exchange process, or synthetic ion exchange process. Recently, some companies have started harvesting rainwater for use in wet processes as it is less likely to cause the problems associated with water hardness.

- Wastewater:

Textile mills including carpet manufacturers, generate wastewater from a wide variety of processes, including wool cleaning and finishing, yarn manufacturing and fabric finishing (such as bleaching, dyeing, resin treatment, waterproofing and retardant flameproofing). Pollutants generated by textile mills include BOD, SS, oil and grease, sulfide, phenols, and chromium. Insecticide residues in fleeces are a particular problem in treating waters generated in wool processing. Animal fats may be present in the wastewater, which, if not contaminated, can be recovered for the production of tallow or further rendering.

Textile dyeing plants generate wastewater that contains synthetic (e.g., reactive dyes, acid dyes, basic dyes, disperse dyes, vat dyes, sulfur dyes, mordant dyes, direct dyes, ingrain dyes, solvent dyes, pigment dyes) and natural dyestuff, gum thickener (guar) and various wetting agents, pH buffers and dye retardants or accelerators. Following treatment with polymer-based flocculants and settling agents, typical monitoring parameters include BOD, COD, color (ADMI), sulfide, oil and grease, phenol, TSS and heavy metals (chromium, zinc, lead, copper).

== Pre-treatment ==
Wet process engineering is the most significant division in textile preparation and processing. It is a major stream in textile engineering, which is under the section of textile chemical processing and applied science. Textile manufacturing covers everything from fiber to apparel; covering with yarn, fabric, fabric dyeing, printing, finishing, garments, or apparel manufacturing. There are many variable processes available at the spinning and fabric-forming stages coupled with the complexities of the finishing and coloration processes to the production of a wide range of products.

In the textile industry, wet process engineering plays a vital role in the area of pre-treatment, dyeing, printing, and finishing of both fabrics and apparel. Coloration in fiber stage or yarn stage is also included in the wet processing division.

All the processes of this stream are carried out in an aqueous state or aqueous medium. The main processes of this section include;

- Singeing
- Desizing
- Scouring
- Bleaching
- Mercerizing
- Dyeing
- Printing
- Finishing

=== Singeing ===
The process of singeing is carried out for the purpose of removing the loose hairy fibers protruding from the surface of the cloth, thereby giving it a smooth, even and clean looking face. Singeing is an essential process for the goods or textile material which will be subjected to mercerizing, dyeing and printing to obtain best results from these processes.

The fabric passes over the brushes to raise the fibers, then passes over a plate heated by gas flames. When done to fabrics containing cotton, this results in increased water affinity, better dyeing characteristics, improved reflection, no "frosty" appearance, a smoother surface, better clarity in printing, improved visibility of the fabric structure, less pilling and decreased contamination through the removal of fluff and lint.

Singeing machines can be of three types: plate singeing, roller singeing, or gas singeing. Gas singeing is widely used in the textile industry. In gas singeing, a flame comes into direct contact to the fabric and burn the protruding fiber. Here, flame height and fabric speed is the main concern to minimize the fabric damage.

Singeing is performed only in the woven fabric. But in case of knit fabric, similar process of singeing is known as bio-polishing where enzyme is used to remove the protruding fibers.

=== Desizing ===
Desizing is the process of removing sizing materials from the fabric, which is applied in order to increase the strength of the yarn which can withstand with the friction of loom. Fabric which has not been desized is very stiff and causes difficulty in its treatment with a different solution in subsequent processes.

After singeing operation the sizing material is removed by making it water-soluble and washing it with warm water. Desizing can be done by either the hydrolytic method (rot steep, acid steep, enzymatic steep) or the oxidative method (chlorine, chloride, bromite, hydrogen peroxide)

Depending on the sizing materials that has been used, the cloth may be steeped in a dilute acid and then rinsed, or enzymes may be used to break down the sizing material. Enzymes are applied in the desizing process if starch is used as sizing materials. Carboxymethyl cellulose (CMC) and Poly vinyl alcohol (PVA) are often used as sizing materials.

=== Scouring ===
Scouring is a chemical washing process carried out on cotton fabric to remove natural wax and non-fibrous impurities (e.g. The remains of seed fragments) from the fibers and any added soiling or dirt. Scouring is usually carried in iron vessels called kiers. The fabric is boiled in an alkali, which forms a soap with free fatty acids (saponification). A kier is usually enclosed, so the solution of sodium hydroxide can be boiled under pressure, excluding oxygen which would degrade the cellulose in the fiber. If the appropriate reagents are used, scouring will also remove size from the fabric although desizing often precedes scouring and is considered to be a separate process known as fabric preparation. Preparation and scouring are prerequisites to most of the other finishing processes. Even the most naturally white cotton fibers are yellowish at this stage, thus at the next process, bleaching, is required.

The three main processes involved in the scouring are saponification, emulsification and detergency.

The main chemical reagent used in the cotton scouring is sodium hydroxide, which converts saponifiable fats and oils into soaps, dissolves mineral matter and converts pectose and pectin into their soluble salts.

Another scouring chemical is a detergent which is an emulsifying agent and removes dust and dirt particles from the fabric.

Since damage can be caused to the cotton substrate by sodium hydroxide. Due to this, and in order to reduce the alkali content in the effluent, Bio-scouring is introduced in the scouring process in which biological agent is used, such as an enzyme.

=== Bleaching ===
Bleaching improves whiteness by removing natural coloration and remaining trace impurities from the cotton; the degree of bleaching necessary is determined by the required whiteness and absorbency. Cotton being a vegetable fiber will be bleached using an oxidizing agent, such as dilute sodium hypochlorite or dilute hydrogen peroxide. If the fabric is to be dyed a deep shade, then lower levels of bleaching are acceptable. However, for white bedsheets and medical applications, the highest levels of whiteness and absorbency are essential.

Reductive bleaching is also carried out, using sodium hydrosulphite. Fibers like polyamide, polyacrylics and polyacetates can be bleached using reductive bleaching technology.

After scouring and bleaching, optical brightening agents (OBA), are applied to make the textile material appear more white. These OBAs are available in different tints such as blue, violet and red.

=== Mercerizing ===
Mercerization is a treatment for cotton fabric and thread that gives fabric or yarns a lustrous appearance and strengthens them. The process is applied to cellulosic materials like cotton or hemp. A further possibility is mercerizing during which the fabric is treated with a sodium hydroxide solution to cause swelling of the fibers. This results in improved luster, strength, and dye affinity. Cotton is mercerized under tension, and all alkalis must be washed out before the tension is released or shrinkage will take place. Mercerizing can take place directly on grey cloth, or after bleaching.

== Dyeing ==
Dyeing is the application of dyes or pigments on textile materials such as fibers, yarns, and fabrics with the goal of achieving color with desired color fastness. Dyeing is normally done in a special solution containing dyes and particular chemical material. Dye molecules are fixed to the fiber by absorption, diffusion, or bonding with temperature and time being key controlling factors. The bond between dye molecule and fiber may be strong or weak, depending on the dye used. Dyeing and printing are different applications; in printing, color is applied to a localized area with desired patterns. In dyeing, it is applied to the entire textile.

=== Solution dyeing ===
Solution dyeing, also known as dope or spun dyeing, is the process of adding pigments or insoluble dyes to the spinning solution before the solution is extruded through the spinneret. Only manufactured fibers can be solution dyed. It is used for difficult-to-dye fibers such as olefin fibers, and for dyeing fibers for end uses that require excellent colorfastness properties. Because the color pigments become a part of the fiber, solution dyed materials have excellent colorfastness to light, washing, crocking (rubbing), perspiration, and bleach. Dyeing at the solution stage is more expensive since the equipment has to be cleaned thoroughly each time a different color is produced. Thus, the variety of colors and shades produced are limited. In addition, it is difficult to stock the inventory for each color. Decisions regarding color have to be made very early in the manufacturing process. Thus, this stage of dyeing is usually not used for apparel fabrics.

Filament fibers that are produced using the wet spinning method can be dyed while the fibers are still in the coagulating bath. The dye penetration at this stage is high as the fibers are still soft. This method is known as gel dyeing.

=== Fiber dyeing ===
Stock dyeing, top dyeing, and tow dyeing are used to dye fibers at various stages of the manufacturing process prior to the fibers being spun into yarns. The names refer to the stage at which the fiber is when it is dyed. All three are included under the broad category of fiber dyeing.

Stock dyeing is dyeing raw fibers, also called stock, before they are aligned, blended, and spun into yarns.

Top dyeing is dyeing worsted wool fibers after they have been combed to straighten and remove the short fibers. The wool fiber at this stage is known as top. Top dyeing is preferred for worsted wools as the dye does not have to be wasted on the short fibers that are removed during the combing process.

Tow dyeing is dyeing filament fibers before they are cut into short staple fibers. The filament fibers at this stage are known as tow.

The dye penetration is excellent in fiber dyeing, therefore the amount of dye used to dye at this stage is also higher. Fiber dyeing is comparatively more costly than yarn, fabric, and product dyeing. The decision regarding the selection of colors has to be made early in the manufacturing process. Fiber dyeing is typically used to dye wool and other fibers that are used to produce yarns with two or more colors. Fibers for tweeds and fabrics with a "heather" look are often fiber dyed.

=== Yarn dyeing ===
Yarn dyeing adds color at the yarn stage. Skein, package, beam, and space dyeing methods are used to dye yarns.

In skein dyeing the yarns are loosely wound into hanks or skein and then dyed. The yarns have good dye penetration, but the process is slow and comparatively more expensive.

In package dyeing yarns that have been wound on perforated spools are dyed in a pressurized tank. The process is comparatively faster, but the dye uniformity may not be as good as that of skein dyed yarn.

In beam dyeing a perforated warp beam is used instead of the spools used in package dyeing.

Space dyeing is used to produce yarns with multiple colors.

In general, yarn dyeing provides adequate color absorption and penetration for most materials. Thick and highly twisted yarns may not have good dye penetration. This process is typically used when different colored yarns are used in the construction of fabrics (e.g. plaids, checks, iridescent fabrics).

=== Fabric dyeing ===
Fabric dyeing, also known as piece dyeing, is dyeing fabric after it has been constructed. It is economical and the most common method of dyeing solid-colored fabrics. The decision regarding color can be made after the fabric has been manufactured. Thus, it is suitable for quick response orders. Dye penetration may not be good in thicker fabrics, so yarn dyeing is sometimes used to dye thick fabrics in solid colors. Various types of dyeing machines are used for piece dyeing. The selection of the equipment is based on factors such as dye and fabric characteristics, cost, and the intended end-use.

==== Union dyeing ====
Union dyeing is "a method of dyeing a fabric containing two or more types of fibers or yarns to the same shade so as to achieve the appearance of a solid-colored fabric". Fabrics can be dyed using a single or multiple step process. Union dyeing is used to dye solid colored blends and combination fabrics commonly used for apparel and home furnishings.

==== Cross dyeing ====
Cross dyeing is "a method of dyeing blend or combination fabrics to two or more shades by the use of dyes with different affinities for the different fibers". The cross dyeing process can be used to create heather effects, and plaid, check, or striped fabrics. Cross dyed fabrics may be mistaken for fiber or yarn-dyed materials as the fabric is not a solid color, a characteristic considered typical of piece-dyed fabrics. It is not possible to visually differentiate between cross-dyed fabrics and those dyed at the fiber or yarn stage. An example is cross dyeing blue worsted wool fabric with polyester pinstripes. When dyed, the wool yarns are dyed blue, whereas the polyester yarns remain white.

Cross dyeing is commonly used with piece or fabric dyed materials. However, the same concept is applicable to yarn and product dyeing. For example, silk fabric embroidered with white yarn can be embroidered prior to dyeing and product dyed when an order is placed.

=== Product dyeing ===
Product dyeing, also known as garment dyeing, is the process of dyeing products such as hosiery, sweaters, and carpet after they have been produced. This stage of dyeing is suitable when all components dye the same shade (including threads). This method is used to dye sheer hosiery since it is knitted using tubular knitting machines and then stitched prior to dyeing. Tufted carpets, with the exception of carpets produced using solution dyed fibers, are often dyed after they have been tufted. This method is not suitable for apparel with many components such as lining, zippers, and sewing thread, as each component may dye differently. The exception is tinting jeans with pigments for a "vintage" look. In tinting, color is used, whereas in other treatments such as acid-wash and stone-wash, chemical or mechanical processes are used. After garment construction, these products are given the "faded" or "used" look by finishing methods as opposed to dyeing.

Dyeing at this stage is ideal for a quick response. Many t-shirts, sweaters, and other types of casual clothing are product dyed for maximum response to fashion's demand for certain popular colors. Thousands of garments are constructed from prepared-for-dye (PFD) fabric, and then dyed to colors that sell best.

== Dye types ==
Acid dyes are water-soluble anionic dyes that are applied to fibers such as silk, wool, nylon, and modified acrylic fibers using neutral to acid dye baths. Attachment to the fiber is attributed, at least partly, to salt formation between anionic groups in the dyes and cationic groups in the fiber. Acid dyes are not substantive to cellulosic fibers.

Mordant dyes require a mordant, which improves the fastness of the dye against water, light and perspiration. The choice of mordant is very important as different mordants can change the final color significantly. Most natural dyes are mordant dyes and there is therefore a large literature base describing dyeing techniques. The most important mordant dyes are the synthetic mordant dyes, or chrome dyes, used for wool; these comprise some 30% of dyes used for wool and are especially useful for black and navy shades. The mordant, potassium dichromate, is applied as an after-treatment. Many mordants, particularly those in the heavy metal category, can be hazardous to health and extreme care must be taken in using them.

Vat dyes are essentially insoluble in water and incapable of dyeing fibers directly. However, reduction in alkaline liquor produces the water-soluble alkali metal salt of the dye, which, in this leuco form, has an affinity for the textile fiber. Subsequent oxidation reforms the original insoluble dye. The color of denim is due to indigo, the original vat dye.

Reactive dyes utilize a chromophore attached to a substituent that is capable of directly reacting with the fiber substrate. The covalent bonds that attach reactive dye to natural fibers make them among the most permanent of dyes. "Cold" reactive dyes, such as Procion MX, Cibacron F, and Drimarene K, are very easy to use because the dye can be applied at room temperature. Reactive dyes are by far the best choice for dyeing cotton and other cellulose fibers at home or in the art studio.

Disperse dyes were originally developed for the dyeing of cellulose acetate, and are water-insoluble. The dyes are finely ground in the presence of a dispersing agent and sold as a paste, or spray-dried and sold as a powder. Their main use is to dye polyester but they can also be used to dye nylon, cellulose triacetate, and acrylic fibers. In some cases, a dyeing temperature of 130 °C is required, and a pressurized dyebath is used. The very fine particle size gives a large surface area that aids dissolution to allow uptake by the fiber. The dyeing rate can be significantly influenced by the choice of dispersing agent used during the grinding.

Azoic dyeing is a technique in which an insoluble azo dye is produced directly onto or within the fiber. This is achieved by treating a fiber with both diazoic and coupling components. With suitable adjustment of dyebath conditions the two components react to produce the required insoluble azo dye. This technique of dyeing is unique, in that the final color is controlled by the choice of the diazoic and coupling components. This method of dyeing cotton is declining in importance due to the toxic nature of the chemicals used.

Sulfur dyes are two-part "developed" dyes used to dye cotton with dark colors. The initial bath imparts a yellow or pale chartreuse color, This is after–treated with a sulfur compound in place to produce the dark black we are familiar with in socks for instance. Sulfur Black 1 is the largest selling dye by volume.

== Printing ==
Textile printing is referred as localized dyeing. It is the application of color in the form of a paste or ink to the surface of a fabric, in a predetermined pattern. Printing designs onto already dyed fabric is also possible. In properly printed fabrics, the color is bonded with the fiber, so as to resist washing and friction. Textile printing is related to dyeing but, whereas in dyeing proper the whole fabric is uniformly covered with one color, in printing one or more colors are applied to it in certain parts only, and in sharply defined patterns. In printing, wooden blocks, stencils, engraved plates, rollers, or silkscreens can be used to place colors on the fabric. Colorants used in printing contain dyes thickened to prevent the color from spreading by capillary attraction beyond the limits of the pattern or design.

== Finishing ==
Textile finishing is the term used for a series of processes to which all bleached, dyed, printed, and certain grey fabrics are subjected before they put on the market. The object of textile finishing is to render textile goods fit for their purpose or end-use and/or improve serviceability of the fabric.

Finishing on fabric is carried out for both aesthetic and functional purposes to improve the quality and look of a fabric. Fabric may receive considerable added value by applying one or more finishing processes. Finishing processes include

- Raising
- Calendering
- Crease resistance
- Filling
- Softening
- Stiffening
- Water repellency
- Moth proofing
- Mildew-proofing
- Flame retardant
- Anti-static
- soil resistance

=== Calendering ===
Calendering is an operation carried out on a fabric to improve its aesthetics. The fabric passes through a series of calender rollers by wrapping; the face in contact with a roller alternates from one roller to the next. An ordinary calender consists of a series of hard and soft (resilient) bowls (rollers) placed in a definite order. The soft roller may be compressed with either cotton or wool-paper, linen paper or flax paper. The hard metal bowl is either of chilled iron or cast iron or steel. The calender may consist of 3, 5, 6, 7 and 10 rollers. The sequence of the rollers is that no two hard rollers are in contact with each other. Pressure may be applied by compound levers and weights, or hydraulic pressure may be used as an alternative. The pressure and heat applied in calendering depend on the type of the finish required.

The purposes of calendering are to upgrade the fabric hand and to impart a smooth, silky touch to the fabric, to compress the fabric and reduce its thickness, to improve the opacity of the fabric, to reduce the air permeability of the fabric by changing its porosity, to impart different degree of luster of the fabric, and to reduce the yarn slippage.

=== Raising ===
An important and oldest textile finishing is brushing or raising. Using this process a wide variety of fabrics including blankets, flannelettes, and industrial fabrics can be produced. The process of raising consists of lifting from the body of the fabric a layer of fibers which stands out from the surface which is termed as "pile". The formation of the pile on a fabric results in a "lofty" handle and may also subdue the weave or pattern and color of the cloth.

There are two types of raising machines; the Teasel machine and the Card-wire machine. The speed of the card-wire raising machine varies from 12 to 15 yards per minute, which is 20-30% higher than that of teasel-raising. That is why the card-wire raising machine is widely used.

=== Crease resistance ===
Crease formation in woven or knitted fabric composed of cellulose during washing or folding is the main drawback of cotton fabrics. The molecular chains of the cotton fibers are attached to each other by weak hydrogen bonds. During washing or folding, the hydrogen bonds break easily, and after drying new hydrogen bonds form with the chains in their new position and the crease is stabilized. If crosslink between the polymer chains can be introduced by cross-linking chemicals, then it reinforces the cotton fibers and prevents the permanent displacement of the polymer chains when the fibers are stressed. It is therefore much more difficult for creases to form or for the fabric to shrink on washing.

Crease-resist finishing of cotton includes the following steps:

1. Padding the material with a solution containing a condensation polymer precursor and a suitable polymerization catalyst.
2. Drying and curing in a stenter frame to form crosslink between the polymer chain and adjacent polymer chain.

The catalyst allows the reaction to be carried out 130-180 degree temperature range usually employed in the textile industry and within the usual curing time (within 3 minutes, maximum).

Mainly three classes of catalysts are commonly used now a day.

- Ammonium salts, e.g.Ammonium chloride, sulphate and nitrate.
- Metal salts e.g. Magnesium chloride, Zinc nitrate, Zinc chloride.
- Catalyst mixture e.g. magnesium chloride with added organic and inorganic acids or acid donors.

The purpose of the additives is to offset or counterbalance partly or completely the adverse effect of the crosslinking agent. Thus softening and smoothing agents are applied not only to improve the handle but also to compensate as much as possible for losses in tear strength and abrasion resistance. Every resin finish recipe contains surfactants as emulsifiers, wetting agents and stabilizers. these surface-active substances are necessary to ensure that the fabric is wet rapidly and thoroughly during padding and the components are stable in the liquor.

== See also ==
- Cationization of cotton
- Dyeing
- Finishing (textiles)
