= Bangladesh Textile Mills Association =

Bangladeshi establishment

- Formation: 1983
- Headquarters: Dhaka, Bangladesh
- Region served: Bangladesh
- Official language: Bengali
- Website: www.btmadhaka.com

The Bangladesh Textile Mills Association (BTMA) is the national trade body for textile mills, manufacturers, and mills in Bangladesh and is located in Dhaka, Bangladesh. It carries out research on the textile industry in Bangladesh. Showkat Aziz Russell, the managing director of Amber Denim Mills Limited, a concern of Partex Group, is the president of the trade association.

== History ==
The Bangladesh Textile Mills Association was established and has been registered in 1983 with the Registrar of Joint Stock Companies as an Association, not for profit, under the Companies Act 1994. It is managed by a 27-member board of directors, 3 vice presidents, and one president. Its certificate is necessary for the import of textile machines in Bangladesh. It, along with the Bangladesh Knitwear Manufacturers and Exporters Association (BKMEA) and Bangladesh Garment Manufacturers and Exporters Association (BGMEA), represents the garment industry in Bangladesh. It established the National Institute of Textile Engineering and Research (NITER) in partnership with the Ministry of Textiles and Jute.

== Activities ==
It is the national trade body representing the country's yarn manufacturers, fabric manufacturers, and textile product processor mills under the private sector.

== Past presidents ==
1. A.M. Zahiruddin Khan
2. Alhaj M.A. Hashem
3. Dr. M. M. Amjad Hussain
4. Salahuddin Kasem Khan
5. Saleh Ahmed
6. Waliul Islam
7. Mohammad Shahjahan
8. Salman Fazlur Rahman
9. Abdul Matin Chowdhury
10. M. A. Awal
11. Abdul Hai Sarker
12. Tapan Chowdhury
13. Mohammad Ali Khokon
14. Showkat Aziz Russell
