= Department of Textiles (Bangladesh) =

State industrial regulatory authority

- বস্ত্র অধিদপ্তর
- Formation: 1978
- Founder: Government of Bangladesh
- Type: Government agency
- Purpose: Monitoring of textile industry and maintaining its positive growth
- Headquarters: Kawran Bazar, Dhaka, Bangladesh
- Region served: People's Republic of Bangladesh
- Official language: Bangla
- Director General: Md Nuruzzaman
- Parent organisation: Ministry of Textiles and Jute
- Affiliations: BUTEX; NITER; Ministry of Education (Bangladesh); UGC (Bangladesh)
- Website: www.dot.gov.bd
- Formerly called: বস্ত্র পরিদপ্তর (Bengali)

Department of Textiles (Bengali: বস্ত্র অধিদপ্তর) is a department of the government of Bangladesh under the Ministry of Textiles and Jute which is responsible for the Textile industry in Bangladesh. The function of the department is to act as guardian for this economic sector and to address its needs.

== History ==
The department was first established in 1978, as a subsidised agency of the Bangladeshi Ministry of Textiles and Jute, following a parliamentary ordinance from Jatio Shongshod. Previous to the founding of the department, its responsibilities were handled by the textile wing of the country's ministry of industries.
