= Bangladesh Handloom Board =

Public sector organisation

- Formation: 1978
- Headquarters: Dhaka, Bangladesh
- Region served: Bangladesh
- Official language: Bengali
- Chairman: Md. Jakir Hossan
- Website: www.bhb.gov.bd

The Bangladesh Handloom Board is a statutory public sector organisation in Dhaka, Bangladesh.

== History ==
The Bangladesh Handloom Board was established in January 1978 by the government of Bangladesh. It is now managed by the Ministry of Textiles and Jute. It oversees the work of 1.5 million individual handloom workers in Bangladesh. It works for the preservation of classical Bangladesh weaving techniques of Benaras Palli, jamdani, and muslin.

In 1981 it established a professional training institute for the use of handloom, in Narsingdi. In 2013, the Bangladesh Handloom Board Act was passed which made minor amendments to how often the board should meet.
