= Institution of Engineers, Bangladesh =

National professional organisation of engineers in Bangladesh

Institution of Engineers, Bangladesh (IEB)
- ইঞ্জিনিয়ার্স ইনস্টিটিউশন, বাংলাদেশ
- Crest of Institution of Engineers, Bangladesh

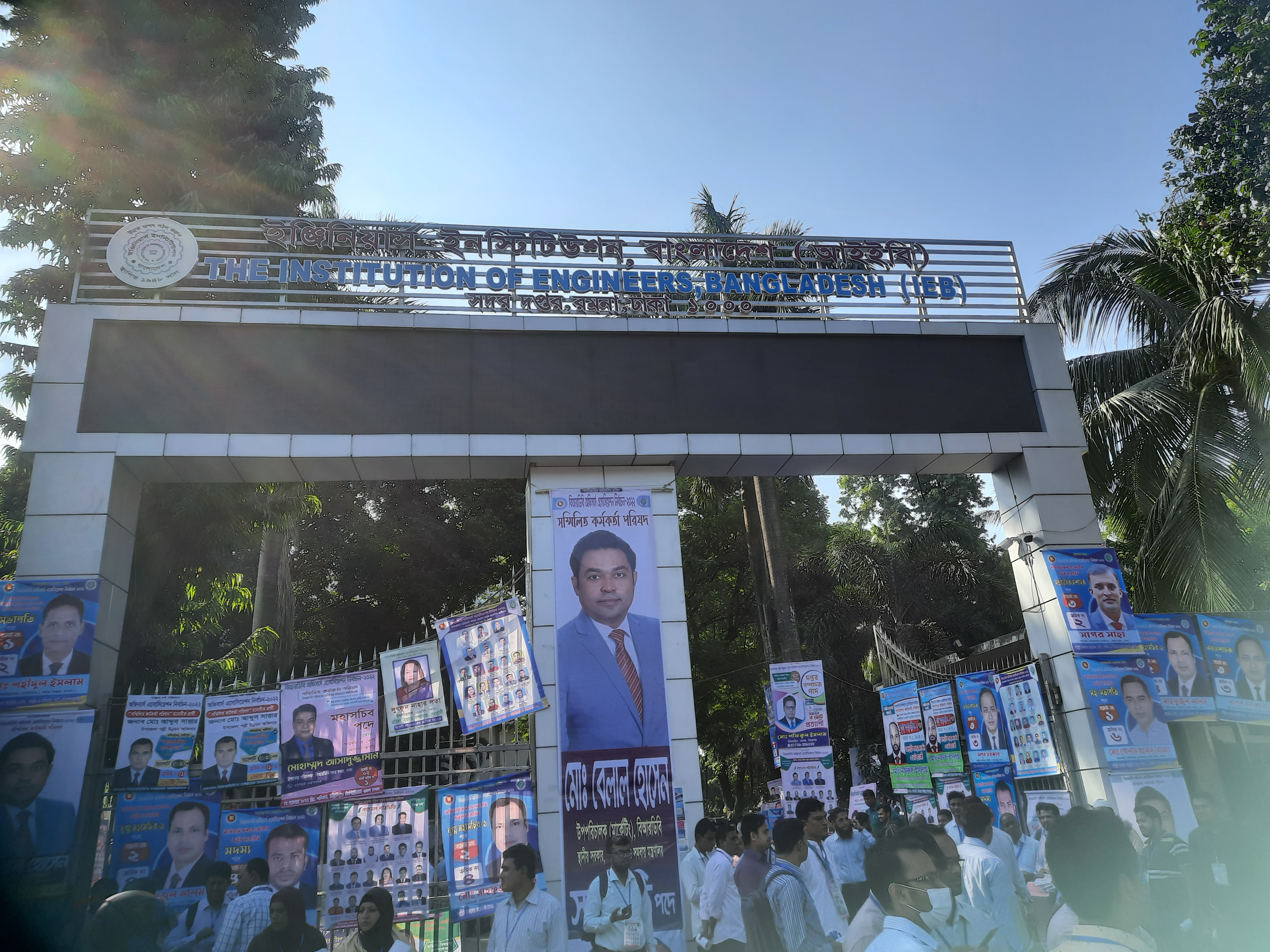
- IEB headquarters in Dhaka
- Abbreviation: IEB
- Formation: 1948
- Type: Nonprofit organisation
- Legal status: Professional association
- Professional title: Engr.
- Headquarters: Ramna, Dhaka 23°44′1.968″N 90°24′4.446″E
- Location: Bangladesh
- Fields: Engineering, technology, research and professionalism
- Members: 60,000
- President: Engr. Mohammad Reazul Islam (Rezu)
- General Secretary: Md. Sabbir Mostafa Khan
- Affiliations: MoE; UGC; Washington Accord
- Website: iebbd.org

The Institution of Engineers, Bangladesh (IEB) is the national professional organisation of engineers in Bangladesh. It is registered under the Societies Registration Act (1860) of the country. Within the country, it has 18 centers and 31 sub-centers. It has 10 'overseas chapter' in different countries of the world, namely: Australia, Kuwait, Malaysia, Oman, Qatar, Saudi Arabia, Singapore, Thailand, the United Arab Emirates and the United States. It formed the Board of Accreditation for Engineering and Technical Education (BAETE) which holds the accreditation of engineering faculties in Bangladesh.

== History ==
After the Bangladesh Liberation War of 1971, the Institution of Engineers, Pakistan was renamed as the Institution of Engineers, Bangladesh, which was founded in 1948, after the end of the British colonial rule in the Indian subcontinent; with its headquarters at Dhaka in Bangladesh.

Around 1947, a number of senior engineers took initiative to establish a forum of engineers in the profession. Soon after, it got its foundation stone laid on 7 May 1948, at Ramna in Dhaka city.

== Divisions ==
IEB has seven divisions within it. They are:

- Agriculture Engineering Division
- Chemical Engineering Division
- Civil Engineering Division
- Computer Engineering Division (established in 2011)
- Electrical Engineering Division
- Electronics Engineering Division
- Mechanical Engineering Division
- Textile Engineering Division

== Organs ==
IEB has four independent organs within it. They are:

- Board of Accreditation for Engineering and Technical Education
- Bangladesh Professional Engineers Registration Board
- Engineering Staff College Bangladesh
- Occupational Safety Board of Bangladesh

== Membership ==
Every professional engineer of Bangladesh is invited to join the Institution of Engineers, Bangladesh (IEB). As of 2024, it has over 60,000 members.

== Board of Accreditation for Engineering and Technical Education ==
Board of Accreditation for Engineering and Technical Education (BAETE) is a non-governmental body that provides accreditation for engineering programs within the jurisdiction of Bangladesh. It operates as an independent and autonomous agency of the Institution of Engineers, Bangladesh (IEB).

BAETE represents the Institution of Engineers, Bangladesh, a full signatory of Washington Accord, an international accreditation agreement for undergraduate professional engineering academic degrees. Under the leadership of A F M Saiful Amin as the chairman of the board, BAETE achieved the full signatory recognition of Washington Accord on 12 June 2024, with effect from 2023, through a unanimous decision of all 23 signatories of the accord. BAETE is also a full member of Network of Accreditation Bodies for Engineering Education in Asia (NABEEA). BAETE also represents IEB in The Federation of Engineering Institutions of Asia and the Pacific (FEIAP).
