= Bangladesh Knitwear Manufacturers and Exporters Association =

Organization of Knitwear manufacturers and exporters of Bangladesh

- Formation: 1996
- Headquarters: Dhaka, Bangladesh
- Region served: Bangladesh
- Official language: Bengali
- Website: www.bkmea.com

The Bangladesh Knitwear Manufacturers and Exporters Association or BKMEA is a national trade organization of Knitwear manufacturers in Bangladesh and is located in Dhaka, Bangladesh. Mohammad Hatem is the president of the body. It is one of the main organizations promoting the ready-made garments industry of Bangladesh, and collaborates with the government and government-backed labour organizations to set policy guidelines for this industry.

== History ==
BKMEA was founded in 1996. It has its own research unit. BKMEA in a partnership with Save The Children has a program to eliminate child labor in the factories of its members. It works with Deutsche Gesellschaft für Internationale Zusammenarbeit to improve labor conditions in Bangladesh garments factories.
