= Bangladesh Jute Research Institute =

Research institute in Bangladesh

- Formation: 1951
- Headquarters: Sher-e-Bangla Nagar, Dhaka
- Region served: Bangladesh
- Official language: Bengali
- Website: www.bjri.gov.bd

Bangladesh Jute Research Institute is the oldest mono corporate research institute in Bangladesh, operated by Bangladesh government.

== History ==
In 1936 the Indian Central Jute Committee established the Jute Agricultural Research Laboratory in Dhaka. After the partition of India the government of Pakistan established the Pakistan Central Jute Committee which reorganised the Jute Research Laboratory as the Jute Research Institute in 1951. After the Independence of Bangladesh the Jute Act was passed and the institute got its present name, Bangladesh Jute Research Institute. In 2013 scientists at the institute decoded the genome of local jute variety. The institute has developed salinity resistant jute plant.
