= Ministry of Textiles and Jute =

Government ministry of Bangladesh

- Bengali: বস্ত্র ও পাট মন্ত্রণালয়
- Government Seal of Bangladesh

Ministry overview
- Formed: 1971; 55 years ago
- Jurisdiction: Government of Bangladesh
- Headquarters: Bangladesh Secretariat, Dhaka
- Annual budget: ৳512 crore (US$42 million) (2026-2027)
- Minister responsible: Khandaker Abdul Muktadir
- Minister of State responsible: Md. Shariful Alam
- Ministry executive: Sharf Uddin Ahmed Choudhury, Secretary
- Child agencies: Department of Textiles (Bangladesh); Bangladesh Jute Mills Corporation; Bangladesh Textile Mills Corporation; Bangladesh Handloom Board; Directorate General of Jute (Bangladesh); Bangladesh Sericulture Development Board; Bangladesh Sericulture Research and Training Institute; Jute Diversification Promotion Centre
- Website: Official website

The Ministry of Textiles and Jute (Bengali: বস্ত্র ও পাট মন্ত্রণালয়, romanized: Bôstrô O Pāṭ Montronaloy) is a ministry of the Government of Bangladesh responsible for formulating and implementing national policies relating to the textile and jute industries. It serves as the country’s principal ministry for the development and promotion of the textile and jute sectors and oversees key agencies involved in textile production, jute development, handloom industries, sericulture, and related activities.

== Attached agencies ==
- Department of Textiles (Bangladesh)
- Bangladesh Jute Mills Corporation
- Bangladesh Textile Mills Corporation
- Bangladesh Handloom Board
- Directorate General of Jute (Bangladesh)
- Bangladesh Sericulture Development Board
- Bangladesh Sericulture Research and Training Institute
- Jute Diversification Promotion Centre

== See also ==
- Bangladesh University of Textiles
