= List of universities in Bangladesh =

Universities in Bangladesh are mainly categorized into four differential types: public (government owned and subsidized), private (private sector owned universities), international (operated and funded by international organizations such as the Organisation of Islamic Cooperation), and the latest Cross Border Higher Education (CBHE) which are either study centres or branch campuses managed by of top universities in the world. Bangladeshi universities are affiliated with the University Grants Commission, a commission created according to the Presidential Order (P.O. No 10 of 1973) of the government of the People's Republic of Bangladesh.

Most universities focus on general studies, mixing together such areas of study as business, engineering and technology. Twenty-two universities have specialized curricula. Two of these are focused on Islamic studies, four on health science, six on agricultural science, six on engineering, one on textile engineering, one on Veterinary medicine, one on Aeronautical science, one on ocean science and one on women's studies.

== Public universities ==
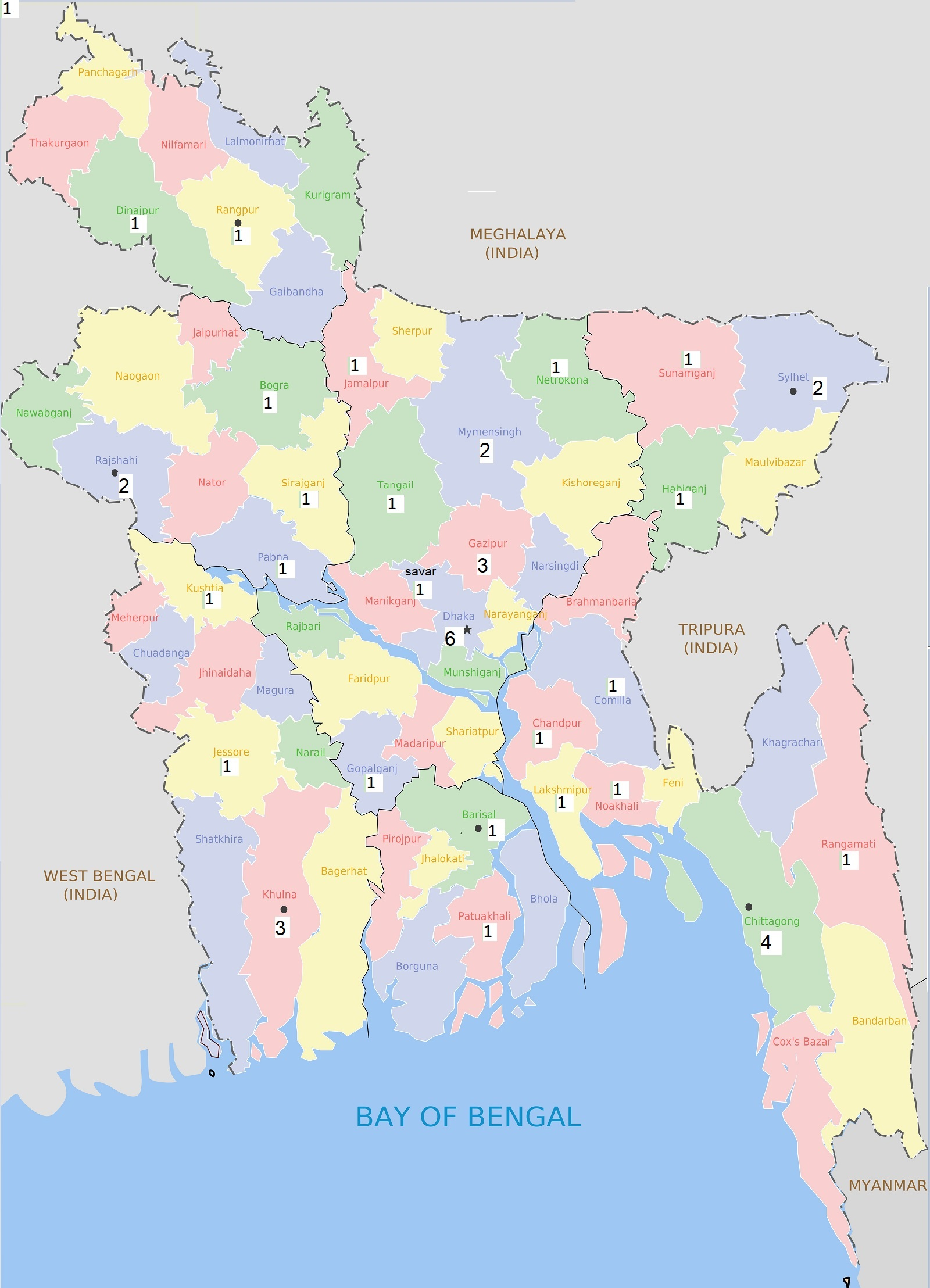
Locations of Public Universities in Bangladesh

Bangladesh has 60 public universities to the bulk of higher studies students. These universities are funded by the government while managed as self-governed organizations.

Dhaka Division is home to 21 public universities, among which 11 are in Dhaka City. There are nine public universities in Chittagong Division, the Khulna Division has seven, Rajshahi Division has six, each of Mymensingh Division, Rangpur Division and Sylhet Division has four. And Barisal Division has three. As of 2022 the University Grants Commission of Bangladesh has introduced the cluster system for students enrollment. According to this system all public universities in Bangladesh should be sorted in five clusters i.e. one for agricultural universities; one for science and technology universities, one for engineering universities, one for medical universities and the last one for general studies universities.

=== General ===
University (Note: The universities are listed according to the time of establishment; The name of the previously established university is elsewhere in the article.)	Acronym	Established (Note: Year when given university status with degree-granting rights, started functioning as independent higher education institute. Many public universities in Bangladesh were not established as the universities, but since the 1990's many prominent colleges and institutes have transformed into universities.)	Location	Division	Specialization	Ph.D. granting	Website
University of Dhaka	DU	1921	Shahbagh, Dhaka	Dhaka Division	General	Yes	link
University of Rajshahi	RU	1953	Motihar, Rajshahi	Rajshahi Division	General	Yes	link
University of Chittagong	CU	1966	Hathazari, Chattogram	Chattogram Division	General	Yes	link
Jahangirnagar University	JU	1970	Savar, Dhaka	Dhaka Division	General	Yes	link
Islamic University, Bangladesh	IU	1979	Kushtia Sadar, Kushtia	Khulna Division	General	Yes	link
Khulna University	KU	1991	Gallamari, Khulna	Khulna Division	General	Yes	link
Jagannath University	JnU	2005	Sadar Ghat, Dhaka	Dhaka Division	General	Yes	link
Comilla University	CoU	2006	Sadar Dakkhin, Comilla	Chittagong Division	General	Yes	link
Jatiya Kabi Kazi Nazrul Islam University	JKKNIU	2006	Trishal, Mymensingh	Mymensingh Division	General	Yes	link
Bangladesh University of Professionals	BUP	2008	Mirpur, Dhaka	Dhaka Division	General	Yes	link
Begum Rokeya University	BRUR	2008	Kotwali	Rangpur Division	General	Yes	link
University of Barisal	BU	2011	Bandar, Barisal	Barisal Division	General	No	link
Rabindra University, Bangladesh	RUB	2017	Shahjadpur, Sirajganj	Rajshahi Division	General	No	link
Netrokona University	NkU	2018	Netrokona Sadar, Netrokona	Mymensingh Division	General	No	link
Kishoreganj University	KgU	2020	Kishoreganj Sadar, Kishoreganj	Dhaka Division	General	No	link
Meherpur University	MU	2022	Mujibnagar, Meherpur	Khulna Division	General	No	link
University of Bogura	UB	2001	Bogura Sadar, Bogura	Rajshahi Division	General	No	link
Thakurgaon University	TU	2022	Thakurgaon Sadar, Thakurgaon	Rangpur Division	General	No	
Naogaon University	NaU	2023	Naogaon Sadar, Naogaon	Rajshahi Division	General	No	link

=== Science and technology ===
University	Acronym	Founded	Location	Division	Specialization	Ph.D. granting	Website
Shahjalal University of Science and Technology	SUST	1986	Kumargaon, Sylhet	Sylhet Division	STEM	Yes	link
Hajee Mohammad Danesh Science & Technology University	HSTU	1999	Kotwali, Dinajpur	Rangpur Division	STEM	Yes	link
Mawlana Bhashani Science and Technology University	MBSTU	1999	Tangail Sadar, Tangail	Dhaka Division	STEM	Yes	link
Patuakhali Science and Technology University	PSTU	2000	Dumki, Patuakhali	Barisal Division	STEM	Yes	link
Noakhali Science and Technology University	NSTU	2006	Sudharam, Noakhali	Chittagong Division	STEM	Yes	link
Jashore University of Science and Technology	JUST	2007	Kotwali, Jessore	Khulna Division	STEM	Yes	link
Pabna University of Science and Technology	PUST	2008	Kotwali, Pabna	Rajshahi Division	STEM	Yes	link
Gopalganj Science and Technology University	GSTU	2011	Gopalganj Sadar, Gopalganj	Dhaka Division	STEM	No	link
Rangamati Science and Technology University	RmSTU	2014	Kotwali, Rangamati	Chittagong Division	STEM	No	link
Jamalpur Science and Technology University	JSTU	2017	Melandaha, Jamalpur	Mymensingh Division	STEM	No	link
Chandpur Science and Technology University	CSTU	2020	Chandpur Sadar, Chandpur	Chittagong Division	STEM	No	link
Sunamganj Science and Technology University	SSTU	2020	Shantiganj, Sunamganj	Sylhet Division	STEM	No	link
Lakshmipur Science and Technology University	LSTU	2020	Lakshmipur Sadar, Lakshmipur	Chittagong Division	STEM	No	
Pirojpur Science and Technology University	PrSTU	2022	Pirojpur Sadar, Pirojpur	Barishal Division	STEM	No	link
Satkhira University of Science and Technology	SaUST	2023	Satkhira Sadar, Satkhira	Khulna Division	STEM	No	
Narayanganj Science and Technology University	NGSTU	2023	Narayanganj Sadar, Narayanganj	Dhaka Division	STEM	No	

=== Engineering ===
University	Acronym	Established	Location	Division	Specialization	Ph.D. granting	Website
Bangladesh University of Engineering & Technology	BUET	1962	Palashi, Dhaka	Dhaka Division	Engineering	Yes	link
Military Institute of Science and Technology	MIST	1998	Mirpur Cantonment, Dhaka	Dhaka Division	Engineering	Yes	link
Rajshahi University of Engineering & Technology	RUET	2003	Motihar, Rajshahi	Rajshahi Division	Engineering	Yes	link
Khulna University of Engineering & Technology	KUET	2003	Fulbari Gate, Khulna	Khulna Division	Engineering	Yes	link
Chittagong University of Engineering & Technology	CUET	2003	Raozan, Chittagong	Chittagong Division	Engineering	Yes	link
Dhaka University of Engineering & Technology	DUET	2003	Joydebpur, Gazipur	Dhaka Division	Engineering	Yes	link

=== Agricultural ===
University	Acronym	Established	Location	Division	Specialization	Ph.D. granting	Website
Bangladesh Agricultural University	BAU	1961	Kotwali, Mymensingh	Mymensingh Division	Agricultural Science	Yes	link
Gazipur Agricultural University	GAU	1998	Salna, Gazipur	Dhaka Division	Agricultural Science	Yes	link
Sher-e-Bangla Agricultural University	SBAU	2001	Sher e Bangla Nagar, Dhaka	Dhaka Division	Agricultural Science	Yes	link
Sylhet Agricultural University	SAU	2006	Uttar Baluchar, Sylhet	Sylhet Division	Agricultural Science	Yes	link
Khulna Agricultural University	KAU	2019	Daulatpur, Khulna	Khulna Division	Agricultural science	No	link
Habiganj Agricultural University	HAU	2020	Habiganj Sadar, Habiganj	Sylhet Division	Agricultural science	No	link
Kurigram Agricultural University	KuriAU	2022	Kurigram, Kurigram	Rangpur Division	Agricultural science	No	link
Shariatpur Agriculture University	ShAU	2021	Shariatpur, Sadar Shariatpur	Dhaka Division	Agricultural science	No	

=== Medical ===
University	Acronym	Founded	Location	Division	Specialization	Ph.D. granting	Website
Bangladesh Medical University	BMU	1998	Shabagh, Dhaka	Dhaka Division	Medical	Yes	link
Chittagong Medical University	CMU	2016	Salimpur, Chittagong	Chittagong Division	Medical	No	link
Rajshahi Medical University	RMU	2017	Rajpara, Rajshahi	Rajshahi Division	Medical	No	link
Sylhet Medical University	SMU	2018	Ambarkhana, Sylhet	Sylhet Division	Medical	No	link
Khulna Medical University	KMU	2020	Labanchara, Khulna	Khulna Division	Medical	No	link

=== Other specialized ===
University	Acronym	Founded	Location	Division	Specialization	Ph.D. granting	Website
Chittagong Veterinary and Animal Sciences University	CVASU	2006	Jhautala, Chittagong	Chittagong Division	Veterinary Science	Yes	link
Bangladesh University of Textiles	BUTEX	2010	Tejgaon Industrial area, Dhaka	Dhaka Division	Textile Engineering	Yes	link
Bangladesh Maritime University	BMU	2013	Sitakunda, Chittagong	Chittagong Division	Maritime transport	No	link
University of Frontier Technology, Bangladesh	UFTB	2018	Kaliakoir, Gazipur	Dhaka Division	ICT	No	link
Aviation and Aerospace University Bangladesh	AAUB	2019	Lalmonirhat Sadar, Lalmonirhat	Rangpur Division	Aeronautical Science	No	link

=== Off-campus ===
The following are the public universities that operate through a number of colleges all over Bangladesh instead of a localized campus.

University	Acronym	Founded	Location	Specialization	Ph.D. granting	Website
National University Bangladesh	NU	1992	Joydebpur, Gazipur	General	Yes	link
Bangladesh Open University	BOU	1992	Joydebpur, Gazipur	General	Yes	link
Islamic Arabic University	IAU	2013	Mohammadpur, Dhaka	Islamic	No	link
Dhaka Central University	DCU	2026	Agargaon, Dhaka	General	No	link

=== Affiliate institutes ===
==== Public engineering colleges ====
Colleges	Acronym	Founded	Affiliation	Location	Division	Specialization	Ph.D. granting	Website
Sylhet Engineering College.	SEC	2007	SUST	Tilagarh, Sylhet	Sylhet Division	Engineering	No	link
Mymensingh Engineering College.	MEC	2007	DU	Kotwali, Mymensingh	Mymensingh Division	Engineering	No	link
Faridpur Engineering College.	FEC	2010	DU	Kotwali, Faridpur	Dhaka Division	Engineering	No	link
Barisal Engineering College.	BEC	2018	DU	Kotwali, Barisal	Barisal Division	Engineering	No	link

==== Specialized public engineering colleges(BSc in Textile engineering) ====
Colleges	Acronym	Founded	Affiliation	Location	Division	Specialization	Ph.D. granting	Website
Textile Engineering College, Chittagong	CTEC	2006	BUTEX	Mirsharai, Chittagong	Chittagong Division	Textile Engineering	No	link
Pabna Textile Engineering College	PTEC	2006	BUTEX	Shalgaria. Pabna	Rajshahi Division	Textile Engineering	No	link
Textile Engineering College, Noakhali	TECN	2007	BUTEX	Begumganj, Noakhali	Chittagong Division	Textile Engineering	No	link
Tangail Textile Engineering College, Tangail.	TTEC	2007	BUTEX	Kalihati, Tangail	Dhaka Division	Textile Engineering	No	link
Barishal Textile Engineering College	BTEC	2010	BUTEX	C&B Road, Barisal	Barisal Division	Textile Engineering	No	link
Jhenaidah Textile Engineering College, Jhenaidah	JTEC	2016	BUTEX	Aruakandi, Jhenaidah	Khulna Division	Textile Engineering	No	link
Rangpur Textile Engineering College	RTEC	2018	BUTEX	Pirganj, Rangpur	Rangpur Division	Textile Engineering	No	link
Gopalganj Textile Engineering College	GTEC	2021	BUTEX	Ghonapara, Gopalganj	Dhaka Division	Textile Engineering	No	link
Jamalpur Textile Engineering College	JTEC	2022	BUTEX	Melandaha, Jamalpur	Mymensigh Division	Textile Engineering	No	link

== Private universities ==
=== General ===
University	Acronym	Established	Location	Division	Specialization	PhD granting	Website
International University of Business Agriculture and Technology	IUBAT	1992	Dhaka	Dhaka Division	General	No	link
North South University	NSU	1992	Dhaka	Dhaka Division	General	No	link
Independent University, Bangladesh	IUB	1993	Dhaka	Dhaka Division	General	No	link
American International University-Bangladesh	AIUB	1994	Dhaka	Dhaka Division	General	No	link
Dhaka International University	DIU	1995	Dhaka	Dhaka Division	General	No	link
International Islamic University, Chittagong	IIUC	1995	Chittagong	Chittagong Division	General	No	link
Asian University of Bangladesh	AUB	1996	Dhaka	Dhaka Division	General	No	link
East West University	EWU	1996	Dhaka	Dhaka Division	General	No	link
Gono Bishwabidyalay	GB	1996	Dhaka	Dhaka Division	General	No	link
People's University of Bangladesh	PUB	1996	Dhaka	Dhaka Division	General	No	link
Queens University	QU	1996	Dhaka	Dhaka Division	General	No	link
University of Asia Pacific (Bangladesh)	UAP	1996	Dhaka	Dhaka Division	General	No	link
Chittagong Independent University (CIU)	CIU	2013	Chittagong	Chittagong Division	General	No	link
Bangladesh University	BU	2001	Dhaka	Dhaka Division	General	No	link
BGC Trust University Bangladesh	BGCTUB	2001	Chittagong	Chittagong Division	General	No	link
Brac University	BracU	2001	Dhaka	Dhaka Division	General	Yes	link
Manarat International University	MIU	2001	Dhaka	Dhaka Division	General	No	link
Premier University, Chittagong	PU	2001	Chittagong	Chittagong Division	General	No	link
Southern University, Bangladesh	SUB	2001	Chittagong	Chittagong Division	General	No	link
Sylhet International University	SIU	2001	Sylhet	Sylhet Division	General	No	link
University of Development Alternative	UODA	2002	Dhaka	Dhaka Division	General	No	link
City University, Bangladesh	CUB	2002	Dhaka	Dhaka Division	General	No	link
Daffodil International University	DIU	2002	Dhaka	Dhaka Division	General	No	link
Green University of Bangladesh	GUB	2002	Dhaka	Dhaka Division	General	No	link
IBAIS University	IU	2002	Dhaka	Dhaka Division	General	No	link
Leading University	LU	2002	Sylhet	Sylhet Division	General	No	link
Northern University, Bangladesh	NUB	2002	Dhaka	Dhaka Division	General	No	link
Prime University	PU	2002	Dhaka	Dhaka Division	General	No	link
Southeast University	SEU	2002	Dhaka	Dhaka Division	General	No	link
Stamford University Bangladesh	SU	2002	Dhaka	Dhaka Division	General	No	link
State University of Bangladesh	SUB	2002	Dhaka	Dhaka Division	General	No	link
Eastern University, Bangladesh	EU	2003	Dhaka	Dhaka Division	General	No	link
Metropolitan University	MU	2003	Sylhet	Sylhet Division	General	No	link
Millennium University	MU	2003	Dhaka	Dhaka Division	General	No	link
Primeasia University	PAU	2003	Dhaka	Dhaka Division	General	No	link
Royal University of Dhaka	RUD	2003	Dhaka	Dhaka Division	General	No	link
United International University	UIU	2003	Dhaka	Dhaka Division	General	No	link
University of Information Technology and Sciences	UITS	2003	Dhaka	Dhaka Division	General	No	link
University of South Asia, Bangladesh	USAB	2003	Dhaka	Dhaka Division	General	No	link
Presidency University	PU	2003	Dhaka	Dhaka Division	General	No	link
Uttara University	UU	2003	Dhaka	Dhaka Division	General	No	link
Victoria University of Bangladesh	VUB	2003	Dhaka	Dhaka Division	General	No	link
World University of Bangladesh	WUB	2003	Dhaka	Dhaka Division	General	No	link
Asa University Bangladesh	ASAUB	2006	Dhaka	Dhaka Division	General	No	link
Bangladesh Islami University	BIU	2006	Dhaka	Dhaka Division	General	No	link
East Delta University	EDU	2006	Chittagong	Chittagong Division	General	No	link
Northern University of Business and Technology Khulna	NUB	2010	Khulna	Khulna Division	General	No	link
Britannia University	BU	2010	Comilla	Chittagong Division	General	No	link
Feni University	FU	2010	Feni	Chittagong Division	General	No	link
Khwaja Yunus Ali University	KYAU	2010	Sirajgonj	Rajshahi Division	General	No	link
European University of Bangladesh	EUB	2012	Dhaka	Dhaka Division	General	No	link
First Capital University Of Bangladesh	FCUB	2012	Chuadanga	Khulna Division	General	No	link
BGMEA University of Fashion & Technology	BUFT	2012	Dhaka	Dhaka Division	General	No	link
Hamdard University Bangladesh	HUB	2012	Munshiganj	Dhaka Division	General	No	link
Ishakha International University	IIUB	2012	Kishoreganj	Dhaka Division	General	No	link
North East University Bangladesh	NEUB	2012	Sylhet	Sylhet Division	General	No	link
North Western University, Bangladesh	NWU	2012	Khulna	Khulna Division	General	No	link
Port City International University	PCIU	2012	Chittagong	Chittagong Division	General	No	link
Varendra University	VU	2012	Rajshahi	Rajshahi Division	General	No	link
Sonargaon University	SU	2012	Dhaka	Dhaka Division	General	No	link
Cox's Bazar International University	CBIU	2013	Cox's Bazar	Chittagong Division	General	No	link
Fareast International University	FIU	2013	Dhaka	Dhaka Division	General	No	link
German University Bangladesh	GUB	2013	Gazipur	Dhaka Division	General	No	link
North Bengal International University	NBIU	2013	Rajshahi	Rajshahi Division	General	No	link
Notre Dame University Bangladesh	NDUB	2013	Dhaka	Dhaka Division	General	No	link
Ranada Prasad Shaha University	RPSU	2013	Narayanganj	Dhaka Division	General	No	link
Brahmaputra International University	BIU	2013	Jamalpur	Mymensingh Division	General	No	link
Times University Bangladesh	TMUB	2013	Faridpur	Dhaka Division	General	No	link
Canadian University of Bangladesh	CUB	2015	Dhaka	Dhaka Division	General	No	link
Global University Bangladesh	GUB	2015	Barisal	Barisal Division	General	No	link
NPI University of Bangladesh	NPIUB	2015	Manikganj	Dhaka Division	General	No	link
Rabindra Maitree University	RMU	2015	Kushtia	Khulna Division	General	No	link
University of Scholars	IUS	2015	Dhaka	Dhaka Division	General	No	link
University of Creative Technology Chittagong	UCTC	2015	Chittagong	Chittagong Division	General	No	link
Anwer Khan Modern University	AKMU	2016	Dhaka	Dhaka Division	General	No	link
University of Global Village	UIGV	2016	Barisal	Barisal Division	General	No	link
Khulna Khan Bahadur Ahsanullah University	KKBAU	2018	Khulna	Khulna Division	General	No	link
Trust University, Barishal	TUB	2018	Barisal	Barisal Division	General	No	link
University of Brahmanbaria	UOB	2018	Brahamanbaria	Chittagong Division	General	No	link
University of Skill Enrichment and Technology	USET	2018	Narayanganj	Dhaka Division	General	No	link
International Standard University	ISU	2018	Dhaka	Dhaka Division	General	No	link
ZNRF University of Management Sciences	ZUMS	2018	Dhaka	Dhaka Division	General	No	link
Bandarban University	BdU	2019	Bandarban	Chittagong Division	General	No	link
RTM Al-Kabir Technical University	RTM-AKTU	2020	Sylhet	Sylhet Division	General	No	link
International Islami University of Science and Technology Bangladesh	IIUSTB	2023	Dhaka	Dhaka	Science and Technology	No	link
Microland University of Science and Technology	MUST	2014	Dhaka	Dhaka	Science and Technology	No	link
Lalon University of Science & Arts	LUSA	2023	Kushtia	Khulna	Science and Arts	No	link
Grameen University	GU	2025	Dhaka	Dhaka	General	No	link

=== Science and technology ===
University	Acronym	Established	Location	Division	Specialization	PhD granting	Website
University of Science & Technology Chittagong	USTC	1992	Chittagong	Chittagong Division	STEM	No	link
Ahsanullah University of Science and Technology	AUST	1995	Dhaka	Dhaka Division	STEM	No	link
Pundra University of Science and Technology	PDUST	2001	Bogra	Rajshahi Division	STEM	No	link
Bangladesh University of Business and Technology	BUBT	2003	Dhaka	Dhaka Division	STEM	No	link
Atish Dipankar University of Science and Technology	ADUST	2004	Dhaka	Dhaka Division	STEM	No	link
ZH Sikder University of Science & Technology	ZHSUST	2012	Shariatpur	Dhaka Division	STEM	No	link
Rajshahi Science & Technology University	RSTU	2013	Natore	Rajshahi Division	STEM	No	link
Bangladesh Army International University of Science & Technology	BAIUST	2015	Comilla	Chittagong Division	STEM	No	link
Bangladesh Army University of Science & Technology, Khulna	BAUST, Khulna	2021	Khulna	Khulna Division	STEM	No	link
Bangladesh Army University of Science and Technology, Saidpur	BAUST, Saidpur	2015	Saidpur	Rangpur Division	STEM	No	link
CCN University of Science & Technology	CCNUST	2015	Comilla	Chittagong Division	STEM	No	link
Central University of Science and Technology	CUST	2016	Dhaka	Dhaka Division	STEM	No	link
Dr. Momtaz Begum University of Science and Technology	MUST	2021	Kishoreganj	Dhaka Division	STEM	No	link

=== Specialized ===
University	Acronym	Established	Location	Division	Specialization	PhD granting	Website
Central Women's University	CWU	1993	Dhaka	Dhaka Division	Women's studies	No	link
Shanto-Mariam University of Creative Technology	SMUCT	2003	Dhaka	Dhaka Division	Creative technology	No	link
University of Liberal Arts Bangladesh	ULAB	2004	Dhaka	Dhaka Division	Media studies and journalism	No	link
Bangladesh University of Health Sciences	BUHS	2012	Dhaka	Dhaka Division	Health Sciences	No	link
Exim Bank Agricultural University Bangladesh	EBAUB	2013	Chapainawabganj	Rajshahi Division	Agricultural Science	No	link
Bangladesh Army University of Engineering & Technology	BAUET	2015	Natore	Rajshahi Division	Engineering and Technology	No	link
Tagore University of Creative Arts	TUCA	2016	Dhaka	Dhaka Division	Creative	No	link

== International universities ==
There are only three international universities in Bangladesh according to UGC. They are neither managed nor funded by the government, like public universities, nor established under the Private University Act and managed by a private governing body, like private universities. International Culture University, established by civil society organization and branded by United Nations Academic Impact (UNAI) and United Nations Global Compact (UNGC), is an internationally accredited-affiliated and an active partner of different international organizations working for internationalization of education and international quality. Islamic University of Technology was established by the Organisation of Islamic Cooperation and is located in Gazipur, another is located in Chittagong Division and funded by the Asian University for Women Support Foundation (AUWSF), a United States–based non-profit corporation. later one is South Asian University.

University	Acronym	Founded	Location	Specialization	Ph.D. granting	Website
Islamic University of Technology	IUT	1978	Gazipur	Engineering and Technology (Muslim students only)	Yes	link
Asian University for Women	AUW	2008	Chittagong	(Female students only)	No	link

== Proposed universities ==
In 2016 Prime Minister of Bangladesh announced bringing out Higher Educations reforms to establish at least one university or sub-campus at district level across the country for promotion of higher education.

List of proposed new universities.
University	Acronym	Location	Division	Specialization	Reference
Mymensingh University of Engineering and Technology	MUET	Mymensingh	Mymensingh Division	Engineering University	
Mymensingh Medical University	MMU	Mymensingh	Mymensingh Division	Medical University	
Thakurgaon University of Science and Technology	TSTU	Thakurgaon	Rangpur Division	STEM	
Marine Science University of Barisal	MSUB	Barishal	Barishal Division	Maritime studies	
Michael Madhusudan Cultural University	MMCU	Jashore	Khulna Division	Cultural studies	
Bangladesh University of Juridical Sciences	BUJS			Legal education	
Bangladesh University of Educational Planning and Administration	BUEdPA			Educational management	
University of Blue Economy Sciences and Technology	UBEST	Cox's Bazar	Chattogram Division	Ocean Engineering	

== See also ==
- Education in Bangladesh
- List of architecture schools in Bangladesh
- List of colleges in Bangladesh
- List of institutes in Bangladesh
- List of dental schools in Bangladesh
- List of medical colleges in Bangladesh
- List of schools in Bangladesh
- Textile schools in Bangladesh
- University Grants Commission of Bangladesh
- Universities in Bangladesh
