= Abu Yousuf Md. Abdullah =

Director of IBA, University of Dhaka and Chairman of Northern Education Group

D.Litt. Prof. Dr. Abu Yousuf Md. Abdullah
- আবু ইউসুফ মো. আব্দুল্লাহ
- Born: December 1, 1964 (age 61); Satkhira, Bangladesh
- Occupations: Academic, Entrepreneur, Writer
- Awards: full list

Academic background
- Education: University of Dhaka, Helsinki School of Business, University of Texas

Academic work
- Discipline: Business Administration, International Marketing.
- Website: profdraymabdullah.info

Abu Yousuf Mohammed Abdullah is a distinguished educationist, academic and entrepreneur who is the director of the Institute of Business Administration (IBA) at the University of Dhaka. He is the chairman of the Northern University Bangladesh Trust (NUBT) and Northern University, Bangladesh (NUB). He is a former vice chancellor of Northern University of Business and Technology Khulna (NUBTK). He is also a global advisory of the World Marketing Summit.

== Controversies ==
Professor Yousuf Abdullah arrested for fraud case filed by a land developer company.

== Awards ==
- Honoured with Distinguished D.Litt. title
- Kotler Distinguished Professor of Marketing
- Modern Marketing Conclave-2023
- Arthakantha Business Award for special contribution in tourism development in Bangladesh
- Best Performer in the AMDISA Program of Entrepreneurship Training and Workshop, Awarded by the President of Bangladesh
