= Rajshahi Division =

Division of Bangladesh

Rajshahi Division রাজশাহী বিভাগ Varendra
- Division
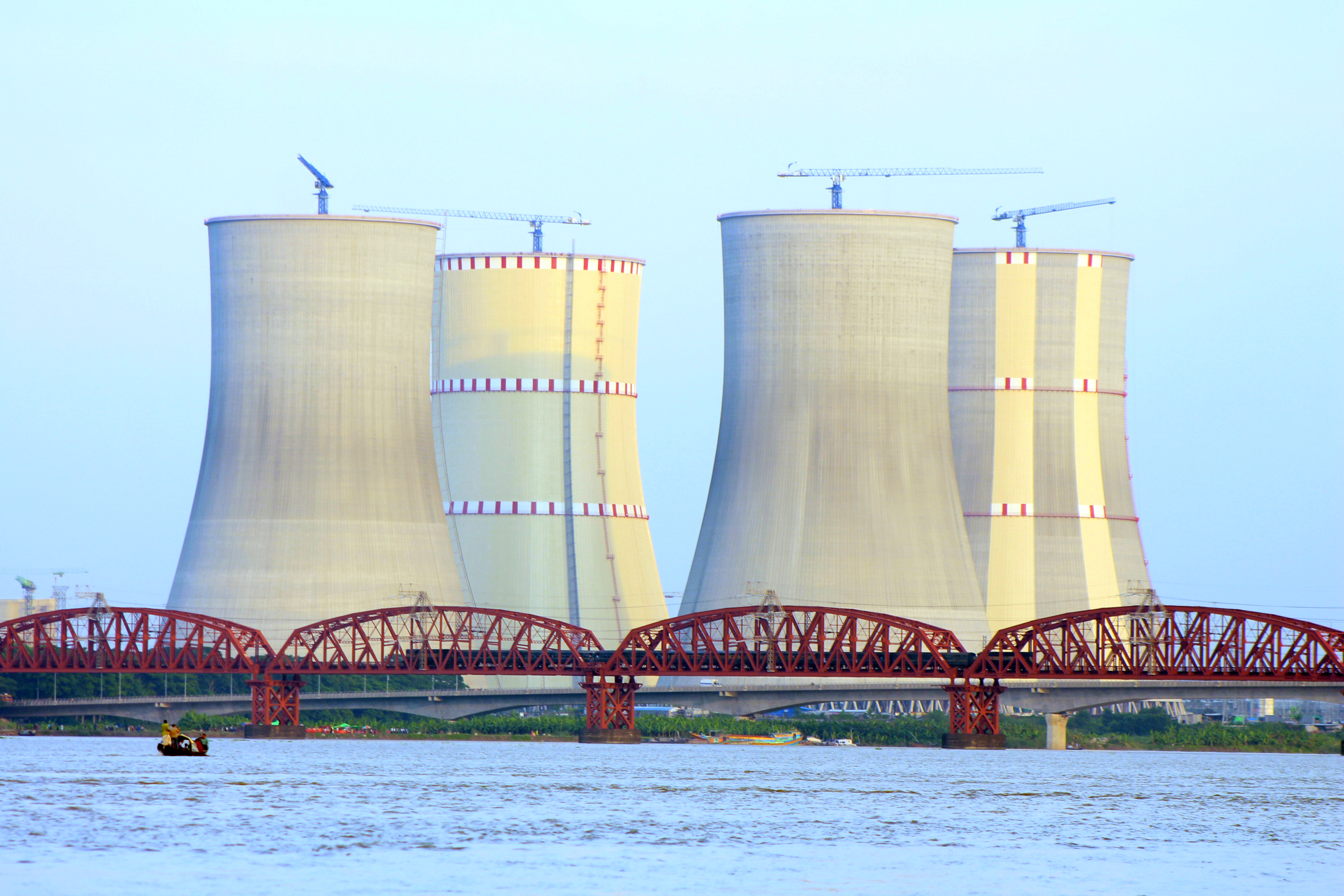
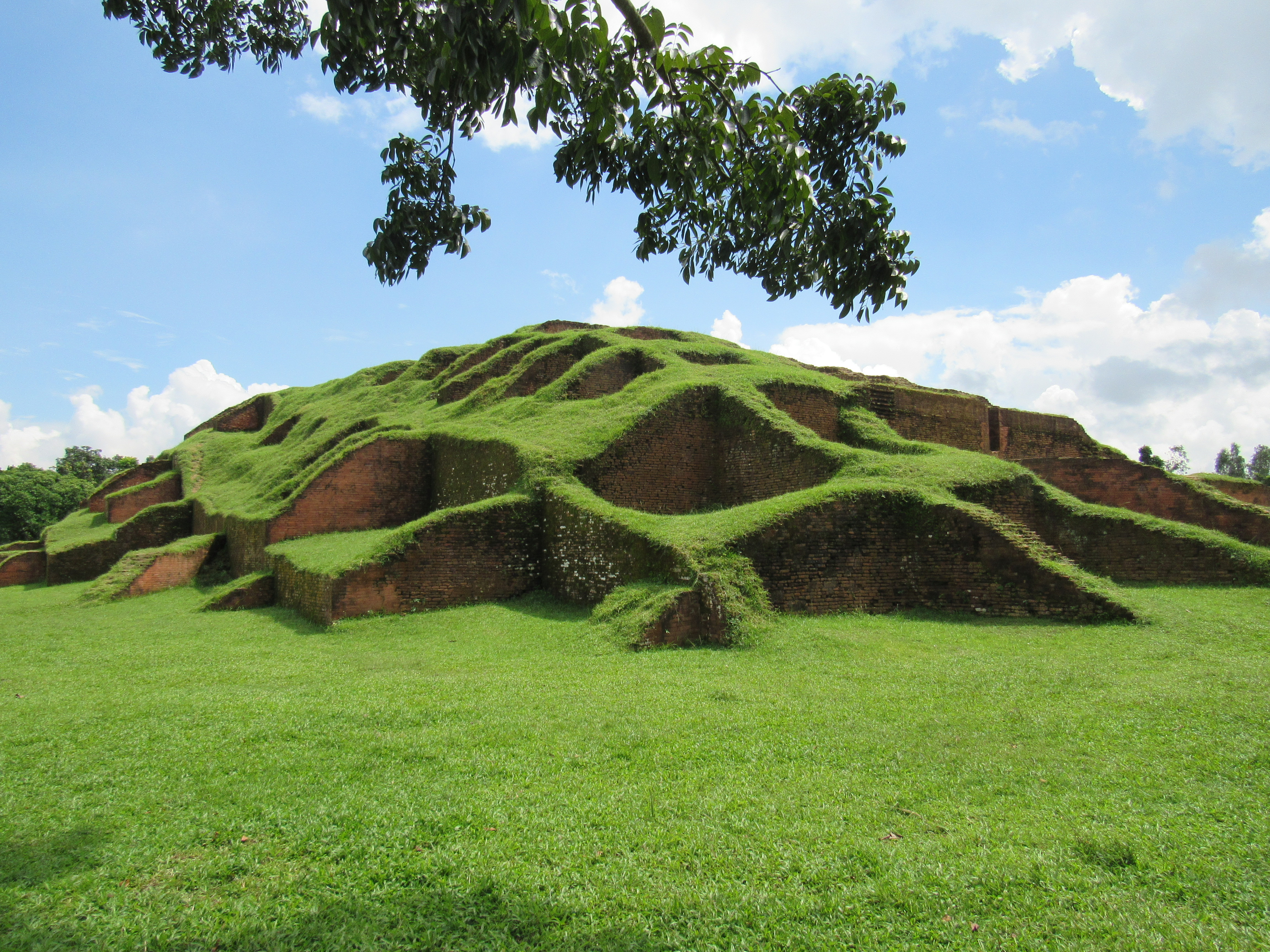
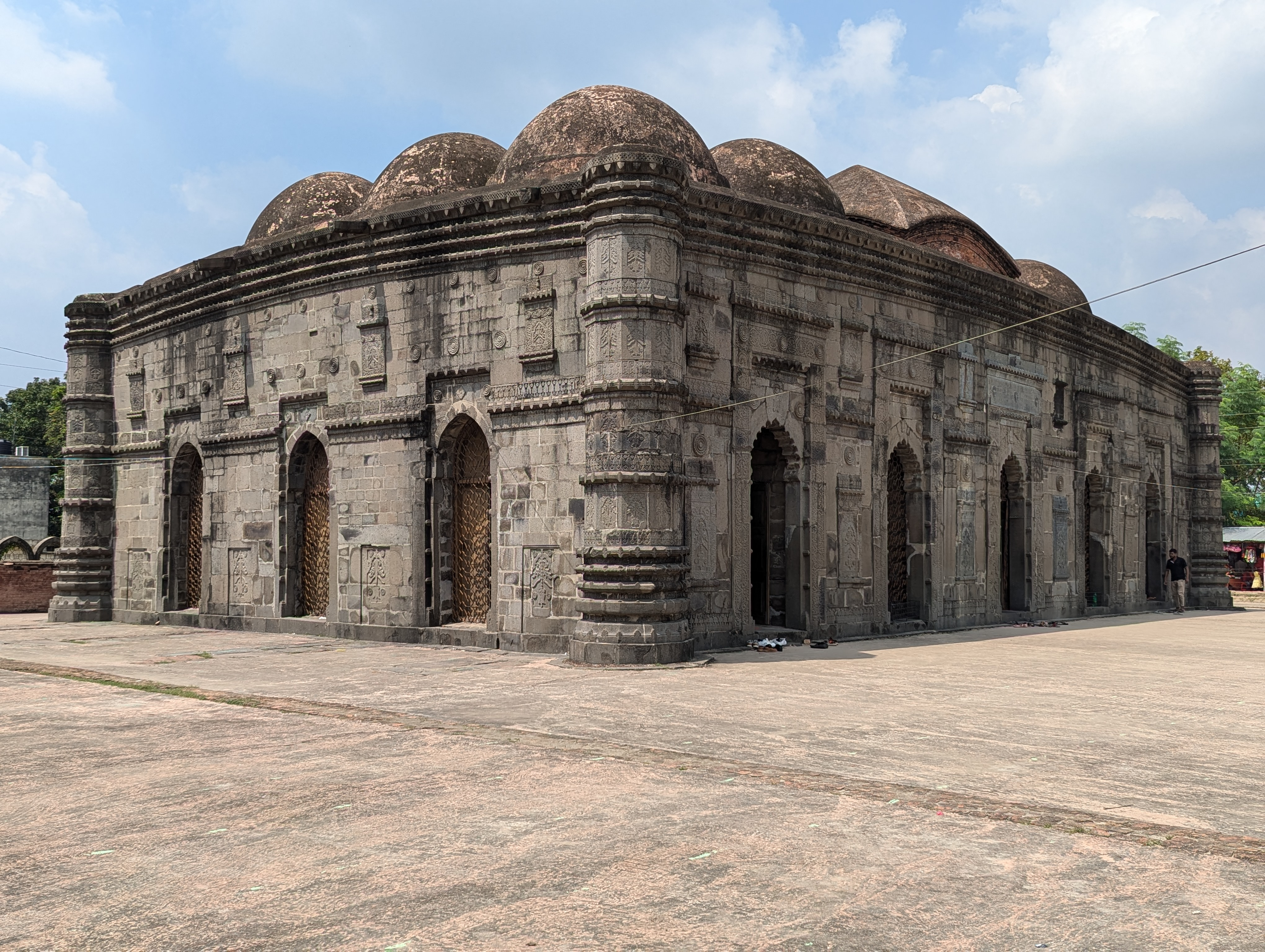
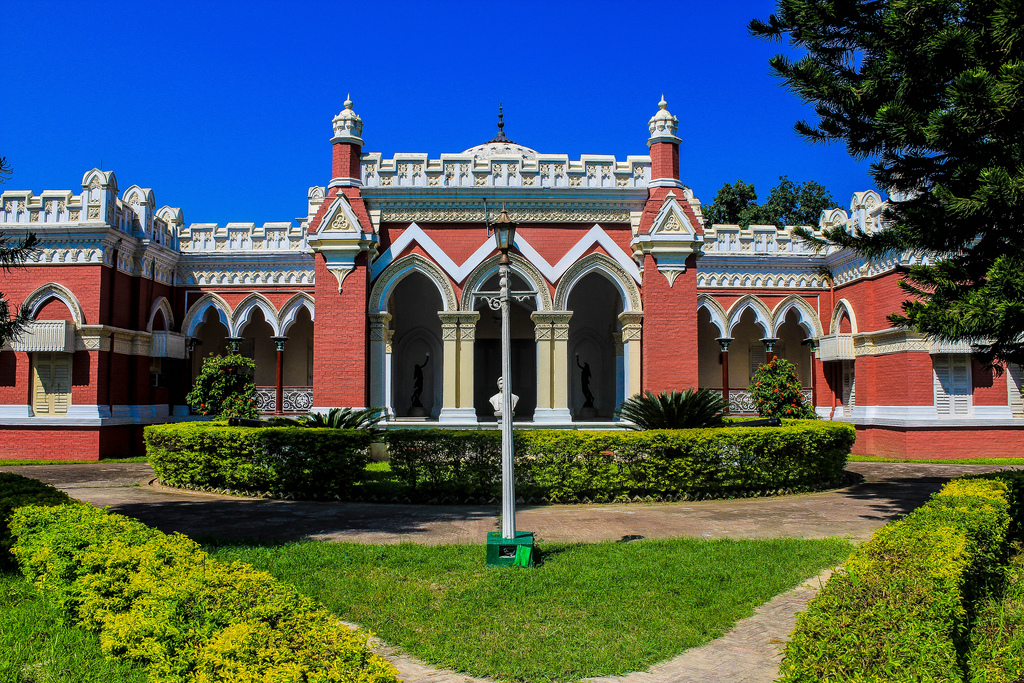
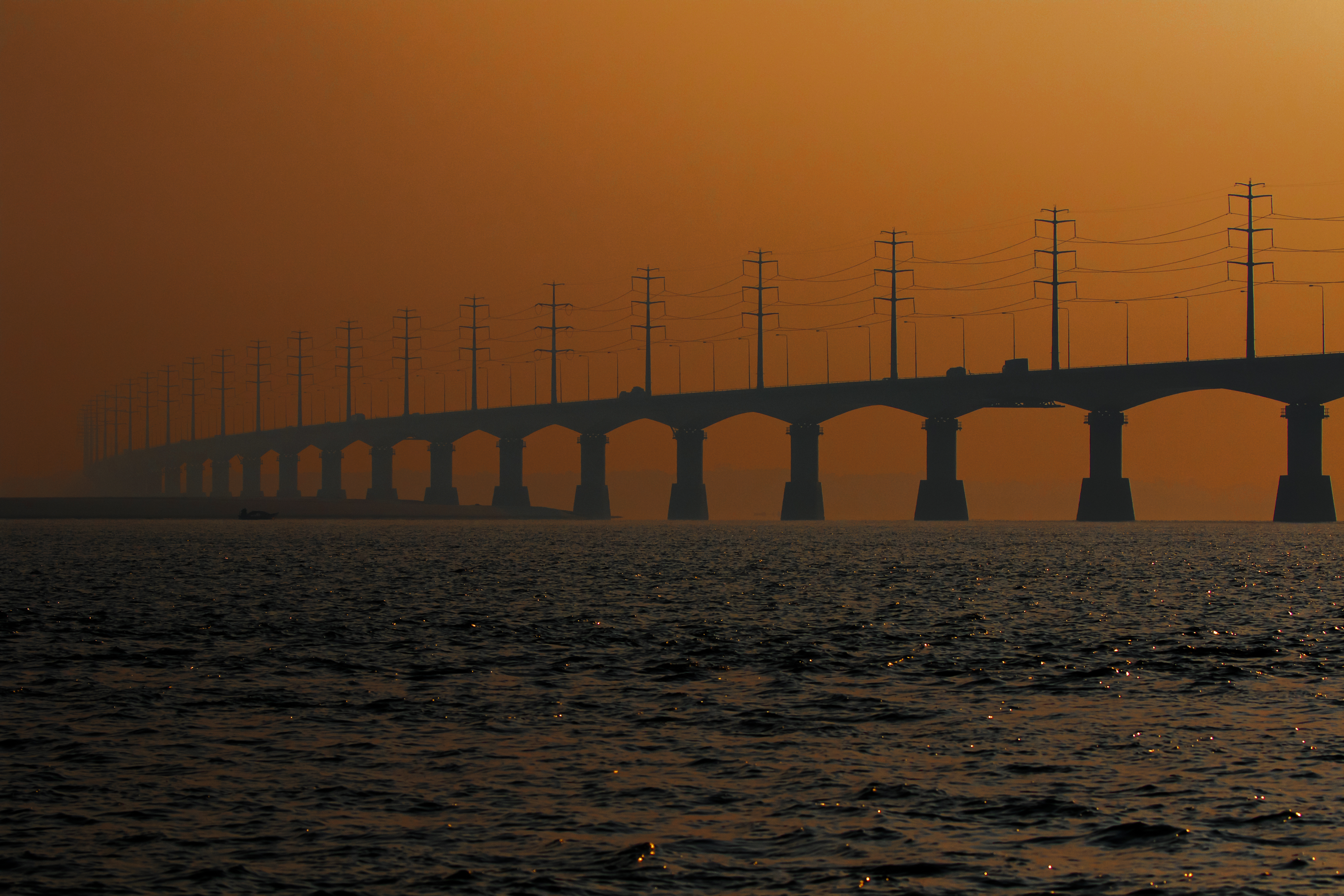
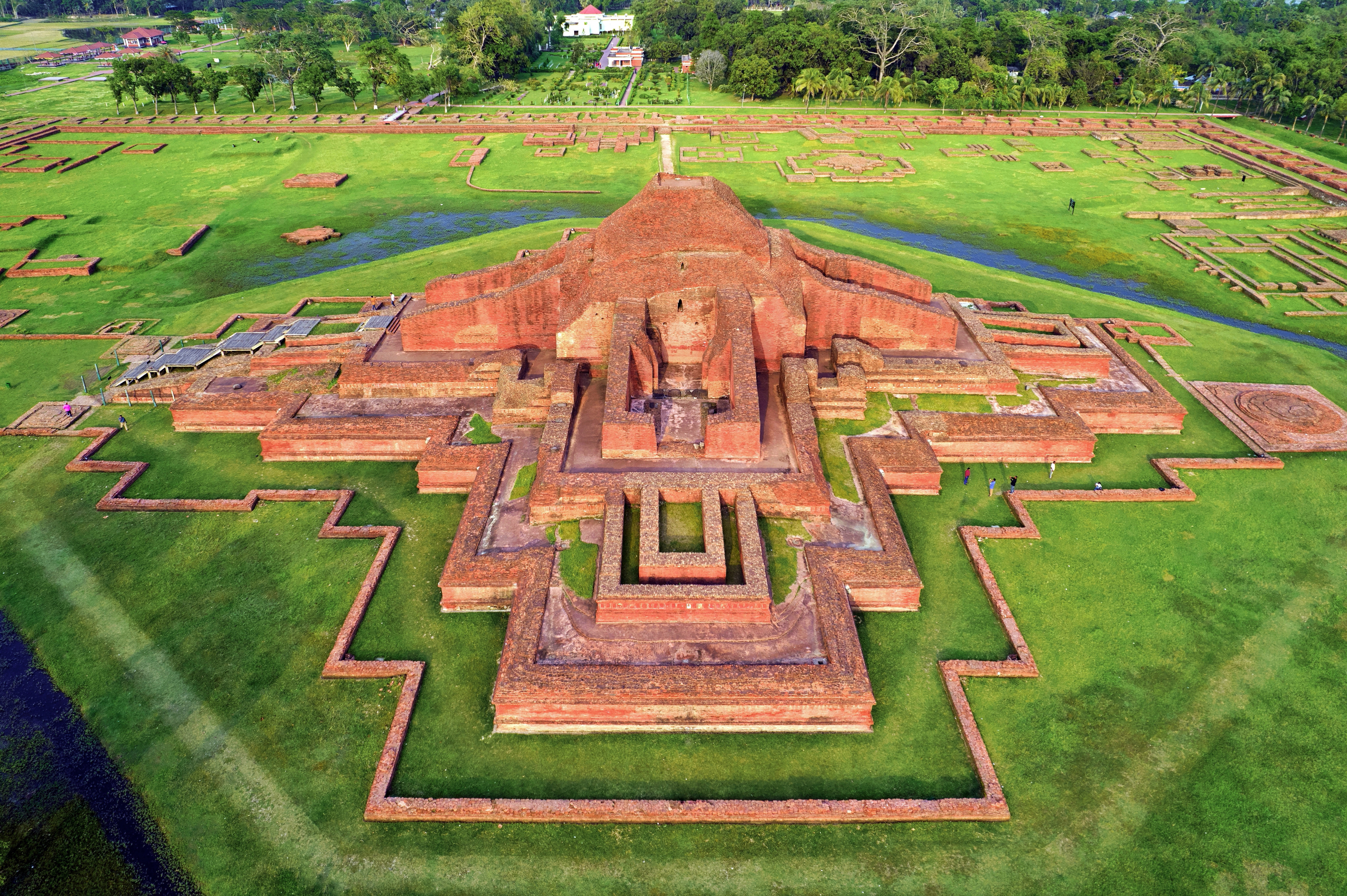
- Clockwise from the top: Rooppur Nuclear Power Plant, Choto Sona Mosque, Jamuna Bridge, Somapura Mahavihara & Hardinge Bridge, Uttara Ganabhaban and Gokul Medh
- Nickname: Land of Zamindars
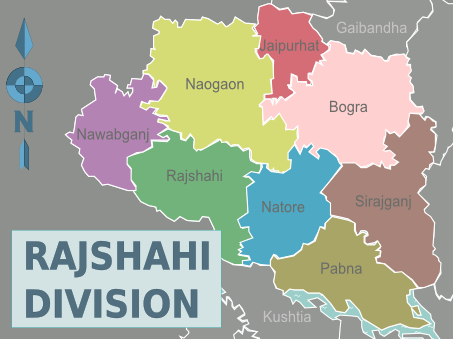
- Interactive map of Rajshahi Division
- Coordinates: 24.3750°N 88.6042°E
- Country: Bangladesh
- Established: 1829
- Capital and largest city: Rajshahi

Government
  - Divisional Commissioner: A.N.M. Bazlur Rashid
  - Deputy Inspector General (DIG): Mohammad Shahjahan
  - Parliamentary constituency: Jatiya Sangsad (39 seats)

Area
  - Division: 18,174.4 km^{2} (7,017.2 sq mi)

Population (2022)
  - Division: 20,353,116 (Enumerated)
  - Urban: 4,840,396
  - Rural: 15,511,404
  - Metro: 553,241
  - Adjusted Population: 20,794,019

Languages
  - Official language: Bengali
  - Recognised foreign language: English
  - Minority languages: List: Santali; Koda; Maithili; Paharia; Kol; Urdu
- Time zone: UTC+6 (BST)
- ISO 3166 code: BD-E
- HDI (2023): 0.700 high
- Website: rajshahidiv.gov.bd

Rajshahi Division (Bengali: রাজশাহী বিভাগ) is one of the eight first-level administrative divisions of Bangladesh. It has an area of 18,174.4 square kilometres (7,017.2 sq mi) and a population at the 2022 Census of 20,353,119. Rajshahi Division consists of 8 districts, 70 upazilas (the next lower administrative tier) and 1,092 unions (the lowest administrative tier).

The region has historically been dominated by various feudal Rajas, Maharajas and Zamindars. Formerly comprising 16 districts, a new division (Rangpur Division) was formed with the 8 northern districts of the old Rajshahi Division from early 2010.

== Etymology and names ==
The Rajshahi Division is named after Rajshahi District. Dominated by various feudal Rajas, Maharajas and zamindars of mixed origins throughout history, the name is a compound of the words Raj and Shahi, both of which can be translated into reign or kingdom. Archaic spellings in the English language also included Rajeshae.

== Demographics ==
Religion in Rajshahi division (2022)
Religion	Percent
Muslims	93.71%
Hindus	5.70%
Christians	0.41%
Others	0.18%

At the time of the 2022 Bangladeshi census, Rajshahi division had a population of 20,351,864. Muslims are 19,071,092 which is 93.71% of the population, while Hindus are 1,159,152 which is 5.70% of the population. Other religions (almost entirely Christianity and indigenous faiths) are 0.59% of the population and are mainly found among the ethnic minorities.

== Districts ==
- Natore
- Rajshahi
- Sirajganj
- Pabna
- Bogura
- Chapainawabganj
- Naogaon
- Joypurhat

== Education ==
Notable schools in Rajshahi invoice:

=== Universities ===
- University of Rajshahi
- Rajshahi University of Engineering and Technology (RUET)
- Rajshahi Medical University
- Varendra University
- Rajshahi Science & Technology University
- North Bengal International University
- Rabindra University, Bangladesh
- Pabna University of Science and Technology
- Naogaon University
- Bangladesh Army University of Engineering & Technology
- University of Bogura
- Pundra University of Science & Technology

=== Medical Colleges ===
- Rajshahi Medical College
- Shaheed Ziaur Rahman Medical College, Bogura
- Pabna Medical College
- Shaheed M. Monsur Ali Medical College, Sirajganj
- Islami Bank Medical College

=== Colleges ===
- Rajshahi College
- Rajshahi Cadet College
- Rajshahi Government City College
- New Government Degree College, Rajshahi
- Pabna Cadet College
- Joypurhat Girls Cadet College, Joypurhat
- Govt. Azizul Haque College, Bogura
- Govt. Edward College, Pabna

=== Schools ===
- Rajshahi University School
- Bogura Zilla School
- Govt. Laboratory High School, Rajshahi
- Pabna Zilla School
- Rajshahi Collegiate School

== Notable residents ==
- Montazur Rahman Akbar, film-maker
- Group Captain (Rtd.) Saiful Azam, fighter pilot, Member of Parliament (MP) for Pabna-3
- Manzoor Alam Beg, photographer
- Apu Biswas
- Mohammad Ali Bogra
- General Jayanto Nath Chaudhuri, OBE, former Chief of Army Staff of the Indian Army
- Pramatha Chaudhuri, writer
- Samson H. Chowdhury, business mangate
- Zahid Hasan, stage actor
- Amjad Hossain, (Member of National Assembly of Pakistan), organiser of Bangladesh War of Independence in 1971.
- A. B. Mirza Azizul Islam, advisor of military-backed 2007-2008 caretaker government
- Taijul Islam, player for the Bangladesh national cricket team
- Abdul Jalil, politician
- James
- Air Vice Marshal (Rtd.) A. K. Khandker, first Chief of Staff of Bangladesh Air Force (1971–1975), Former Minister, Ministry Planning of Bangladesh
- Mahiya Mahi
- Amiya Bhushan Majumdar, Indian novelist
- Partha Pratim Majumder
- Bande Ali Mia, poet
- Bidya Sinha Saha Mim
- Mohammed Fazle Rabbee, cardiologist, intellectual
- Mushfiqur Rahim
- Arifur Rahman
- Tarique Rahman
- Ziaur Rahman
- Sqn Ldr Sarfaraz Ahmed Rafiqui, Pakistani war hero of Indo-Pak War of 1965

== See also ==
- List of mosques in Rajshahi Division
- Districts of Bangladesh
- Divisions of Bangladesh
- Upazila
- Administrative geography of Bangladesh
