= International Standard University =

Private university based in Dhaka, Bangladesh

- ইন্টারন্যাশনাল স্ট্যান্ডার্ড ইউনিভার্সিটি
- Other name: ISU
- Motto: New Dimensions of Education
- Type: Private research
- Established: 2018; 8 years ago
- Affiliations: University Grants Commission (UGC)
- Chancellor: President Mirza Fakhrul Islam Alamgir
- Vice-Chancellor: Abdul Alawal Khan
- Students: 3000 (2024)
- Undergraduates: 3000 (2024)
- Location: 69,C/A Bir Uttam A. K. Khandokar Road, Mohakhali, Dhaka, 1212, Bangladesh; 23.780103°N 90.406558°E
- Campus: Urban,
- Language: English
- Colors: Blue and Silver
- Website: isu.ac.bd

International Standard University is a private university in Mohakhali, Dhaka, Bangladesh.

== History ==
In 2018, this university was approved by the UGC under Private University Act 2010. The following year this university started its operation at Civil Engineering Building in Mohakhali.

In 2019, the university was red-flagged by the UGC. However, as of January 2025, the university was in good standing, with three UGC-approved faculties, for business studies, engineering and technology, and humanities and social science.

== See also ==
- University of Scholars
- Brac University
- NSU
- List of Universities in Bangladesh
