= Bangladesh Army University of Science & Technology, Khulna =

University In Bangladesh

Bangladesh Army University of Science and Technology Khulna
- বাংলাদেশ আর্মি ইউনিভার্সিটি অফ সাইন্স এন্ড টেকনোলজি খুলনা
- Motto: Better Education for a better life
- Type: Private
- Established: 2023
- Chancellor: President Hafiz Uddin Ahmad
- Vice-Chancellor: Brigadier General Nizam Uddin Ahmed
- Students: 250
- Undergraduates: 250
- Location: Nurjahan Tower, Shiromoni, Plot 8 & 9, Atra, Phultala, Khulna, Bangladesh; 22.91824°N 89.50144°E
- Campus: Urban
- Website: baustkhulna.ac.bd

Bangladesh Army University of Science and Technology Khulna (BAUST Khulna) (Bengali: বাংলাদেশ আর্মি ইউনিভার্সিটি অফ সাইন্স এন্ড টেকনোলজি খুলনা) is an army-backed university in Khulna. It is located 10 km north from downtown Khulna and 500 yards south of Jahanabad Cantonment beside the Jashore-Khulna Highway.

== History ==
The establishment of BAUST Khulna started on 4 August 2021. Key administrative personnel, like the project director and registrar, joined by early 2022, and the first vice-chancellor (VC) took his office on 15 February 2022. The BAUST Khulna temporary campus agreement was submitted to the Ministry of Education in mid-2022. The proposal was approved by the University Grants Commission of Bangladesh and Khulna Development Authority in late 2022. The land for a permanent campus was purchased in December of that year.

In 2023, the Prime Minister of Bangladesh, the University Grants Commission of Bangladesh, and the Ministry of Education sent a formal letter to the trustee board of BAUST Khulna. The following year academic activities formally began in the spring semester of 2024.

== Academic ==
BAUST Khulna offers 6 different bachelor courses under 5 faculties and 9 departments.

=== Faculty of Civil Engineering ===
- Department of Civil Engineering

=== Faculty of Electrical and Computer Engineering ===
- Department of Electrical and Electronics Engineering
- Department of Computer Science and Engineering

=== Faculty of Mechanical Engineering ===
- Department of Mechanical Engineering

=== Faculty of Business Studies ===
- Department of Business Administration

=== Faculty of Science and Arts ===
- Department of Physics
- Department of Mathematics
- Department of Chemistry
- Department of English

== Administration ==
=== List of VC ===
- Brigadier General Md Humayun Kabir Bhuiyan (2023–2025)
- Brigadier General Nizam Uddin Ahmed (2025–present)

== Campus ==
BAUST Khulna operates from a temporary campus located in the general area of Shiromoni under Phultala Upazila of Khulna District. Situated about 500 yards west of Jahanabad Cantonment and roughly 10 km from Khulna city, the temporary campus supports academic activities for programs in engineering, English, and business administration.

BAUST Khulna is actively developing its permanent campus on 13 acres of land. Land acquisition began in December 2022, and the site is located at Teligati along the Khulna City Bypass Road (N-709), within 6 No. Jogipol Union of Digholia Upazila.

== See also ==
- Bangladesh Army University of Science and Technology, Saidpur
- Bangladesh Army International University of Science & Technology
- Bangladesh Army University of Engineering & Technology
- List of universities in Bangladesh
