= NSU =

NSU may refer to:

== Universities ==
=== U.S. ===
- Nevada State University, Nevada
- New School University, New York
- Northeastern State University, Oklahoma
- Nicholls State University, Louisiana
- Northwestern State University, Louisiana
- Northern State University, South Dakota
- Norfolk State University, Virginia
- Nova Southeastern University, Florida

=== Japan ===
- Nagoya Sangyo University, a private university in Owariasahi, Aichi, Japan
- Niigata Sangyo University, a private university in Kashiwazaki, Niigata, Japan
- Niigata Seiryo University, a private university in Niigata, Niigata, Japan

=== Other countries ===
- Namangan State University, Namangan, Uzbekistan
- Nasarawa State University, Keffi, Nigeria
- Naval State University, Biliran, Philippines
- Nepal Sanskrit University, Beljhundi, Dang, midwestern Development Region, Nepal
- Netaji Subhas University, Jharkhand, India
- Nordic Summer University, Scandinavia
- North South University, Dhaka, Bangladesh
- Novosibirsk State University, Siberia, Russia

== Political groups ==
- National Socialist Underground, German far-right terrorist group
- Non-Partisan Solidarity Union, a political party in Taiwan
- Nepal Student Union, one of the major student political wings in Nepal
- Norwegian Seafarers' Union, a trade union in Norway

== Vehicles ==
- NSU Motorenwerke, a German manufacturer of cars and motorcycles
  - NSU Sulmobil, a three-wheeled car, 1905 to 1909
  - NSU Delphin III, a streamliner motorcycle that set the motorcycle land speed record in 1956
- Commonwealth Railways NSU class, an Australia class of diesel-electric locomotive
- NSU station, a Tide Light Rail station in Norfolk, Virginia, Norfolk State University
- Nakajima-Fokker Super Universal, Fokker Super Universal, an airplane produced in the U.S., 1920s

== Other uses ==
- Garda National Surveillance Unit (NSU), Irish police intelligence agency
- NASA Space Universe, American punk rock band
- Narail Sadar Upazila, Narail District, Khulna, Bangladesh
- Noakhali Sadar Upazila, Noakhali District, Chittagong, Bangladesh
- Non-specific urethritis, non-gonococcal urethritis
- Norske Skog Union, a paper mill located in Skien in Norway
- NSU University School, pre-K through 12 school in Fort Lauderdale, Florida
- "N.S.U.", a song by Cream from the 1966 album Fresh Cream
