= Abdur Rab (academic) =

- Known for: Vice-Chancellor of International University of Business Agriculture and Technology (IUBAT)

Academic background
- Education: University of Dhaka, Indiana University, University of Belgrade

Abdur Rab is a Bangladeshi academic and vice-chancellor of the International University of Business Agriculture and Technology. He was a professor and director at the Institute of Business Administration at the University of Dhaka.

Rab is the former vice-chancellor of Eastern University.

== Early life ==
Rab did his master's degree in management at the University of Dhaka. He has an MBA from Indiana University. He did his PhD at the University of Belgrade.

== Career ==
Rab was the chairman of the Institute of Management Consultants, Bangladesh from 2010 to 2012. He was the president of the Association of Management Institutions in South Asia. He was a visiting professor at Yunnan Normal University.

On 1 January 2018, Rab was appointed vice-chancellor of International University of Business Agriculture and Technology by President Mohammad Abdul Hamid.

Rab was a member of the technical committee of the 3rd International Conference on Business and Management in 2021.

On 1 February 2022, Rab was reappointed vice-chancellor of International University of Business Agriculture and Technology. Rab is a member of the advisory panel of the Bangladesh Society for Private University Academics. He is a member of the advisory board of the Institute of Business Administration at the University of Dhaka.
