= Rabindra Maitree University =

- রবীন্দ্র মৈত্রী বিশ্ববিদ্যালয়
- Motto: Excellence through Dedication.
- Type: Private research
- Established: 29 December 2015
- Founder: Rabindra Maitree University Trust
- Affiliations: University Grants Commission (UGC)
- Chairman: Professor Dr. Abu Sayed Mohammad Ali
- Chancellor: President Mirza Fakhrul Islam Alamgir
- Vice-Chancellor: Vacant
- Location: Kushtia, 7000, Bangladesh; 23.9030°N 89.1263°E
- Campus: Urban
- Language: English, Bengali
- Registrar (In-Charge): Md. Nowab Ali
- Google Map: https://www.google.com/maps?cid=3517826706393947576
- Facebook Page: https://www.facebook.com/rmukushtia
- Colors: Golden yellow
- Website: rmu.ac.bd

Rabindra Maitree University is a private university in Bangladesh. It is located at 97/71, Ram Chandra Roy Chowdhury Street, Courtpara, Kushtia-7000, Kushtia.

== History ==
The Rabindra Maitree University was proposed for approval to the Ministry of Education, Government of Bangladesh as Legend Trust University in 2011. The proposed university campus was duly inspected by two member committee of the University Grants Commission headed by the then UGC member Professor Dr. Atful Hye Shible. They gave a very positive report to the Ministry of Education for approval of the proposed Legend Trust University. But the proposal met an unexpected delay for its approval. But on 8 May 2015, at a Rabindra Jayanti event at Kuthibari in Shilaidah, Hasanul Haq Inu said that Prime Minister Sheikh Hasina had agreed to set up a separate private university named after Rabindranath Tagore in Kushtia. Government approval for the establishment of the university was reported on 29 December 2015.

As of June 2017, the University Grants Commission (UGC) had not given permission for the university to enroll students. The university started its academic activities with the approval of its 4 academic programs on 21 September 2017. On 4 April 2024, the UGC advised students against enrolling at the university because it lacked a vice chancellor, but Rabindra Maitree University is not in this list.

== Faculty and Departments ==
=== Agricultural Faculty ===
- Department of Agriculture

=== Science and Engineering Faculty ===
- Department of EEE
- Department of CSE
- Department of ICT
- Department of Microbiology

=== Business Studies Faculty ===
- Department of BBA

=== Art and Social Science Faculty ===
Sources:

- Department of Bengali
- Department of English
- Department of Health education and Sports
- Department of Music
- Department of Fine Arts

== Administration ==
The university is governed under a board of trustees, with former information minister Hasanul Haq Inu as chairman and Mohammad Zahurul Islam as vice chairman. Former treasurer of Islamic University, Bangladesh, Md. Shahjahan Ali, is currently serving as the vice-chancellor of the university. And Mohammad Mamun and Ismat Ara Khatun are serving as treasurer and registrar respectively.

== Campus ==
The university has a hall named Parisundari Hall for female students. The hall is named after Parisundari Devi, one of the leaders of the Blue Rebellion. The hall was inaugurated on 4 July 2019.

== See also ==
- List of universities in Bangladesh
