= Northern University of Business and Technology Khulna =

Northern University of Business and Technology
- Type: Private
- Established: 2015
- Affiliations: University Grants Commission
- Chancellor: President Mohammed Shahabuddin
- Vice-Chancellor: Abu Yousuf MD. Abdullah
- Location: Khulna, Bangladesh; 22.8221°N 89.5523°E
- Campus: Urban
- Website: nubtkhulna.ac.bd

Northern University of Business and Technology, Khulna (NUBTK) is a private university in Bangladesh. The university is affiliated to the University Grants Commission. It is the first specialized private university established in the south-west of Bangladesh.

== History ==
According to the Private University Act 2010, the Trustee board submitted a proposal to University Grants Commission Bangladesh to establish a full-fledged university in Khulna named Northern University of Business and Technology Khulna. After the inspection by UGC and verification of all requirements, the Government gave the approval of Northern University of Business and Technology Khulna as a new university on 29 December 2015. It was inaugurated on 9 January 2016. Moshiur Rahman, financial advisor to Prime Minister Sheikh Hasina was the chief guest at the inauguration.

Northern University of Business and Technology Khulna started as an offshoot of Northern University based in Dhaka. Abu Yousuf Md Abdullah is the vice-chancellor of the university. Abdullah sough the nomination from Awami League to contest the general election from Satkhira-3 on 30 December 2018.

== List of vice-chancellors ==
- Abu Yousuf Md. Abdullah (present)

== See also ==
- Northern University, Bangladesh
