= M Alimullah Miyan =

Pioneer of private university in Bangladesh (1942–2017)

- এম আলিমউল্যা মিয়ান
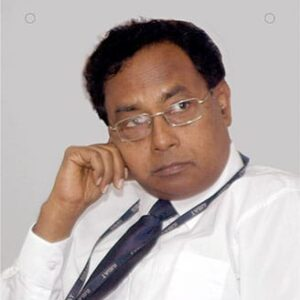
- Born: 15 February 1942; Comilla, Bangladesh
- Died: 10 May 2017 (aged 75)
- Education: University of Dhaka (BCom) (MCom); Indiana University School of Business (MBA); Manchester Business School (PhD)
- Era: Modern
- Board member of: International Society for Labor Law and Social Security, Association of Management Development Institutions in South Asia (AMDISA), Rotary Club of Dhaka, Dhaka Club, Uttara Club of Dhaka, United Nations Office for Disaster Risk Reduction 2009
- Spouse: Selina Nargis
- Website: https://iubat.edu/founders-corner/

M Alimullah Miyan (Bengali: এম আলিমউল্যা মিয়ান; 15 February 1942 – 10 May 2017) is the pioneer of non-government universities in Bangladesh. He founded the first private university in Bangladesh, International University of Business Agriculture and Technology (IUBAT). He was director and professor at the University of Dhaka’s IBA, and founder chairman of the Centre for Population Management and Research (CPMR).

== Early life ==
Miyan was born on 15 February 1942 in Kailine, Chandina Upazila, Comilla District, East Bengal, British India. Miyan completed his Honours and Masters degrees from University of Dhaka in 1962 and 1963 respectively. After, he received his Master of Business Administration at Indiana University School of Business in 1968 and his Doctorate at the Manchester Business School in 1976.

== Career ==
Miyan taught at the Institute of Business Administration at the University of Dhaka. He founded the Centre for Population Management and Research and served as its first chairman. He was a director of Institute of Business Administration.

Miyan founded the International University of Business Agriculture and Technology in 1991. He became the Vice-Chancellor of IUBAT in 1994. He was a founding member of Association of Management Development Institutions in South Asia. He was an executive member of the International Society for Labour and Social Security Law. He was a member of the International Labour and Employment Relations Association.

In June 2007, Miyan attended a meeting of the Association of Private Universities of Bangladesh which called for the withdrawal of VAT placed on private universities.

Miyan was the president of Rotary Club of Greater Dhaka in 2008. He signed a cooperation agreement with the University of Michigan–Flint. He opposed the private university ordinance-2008 proposed by the caretaker government.

Miyan launched the Bangladeshi chapter of World Wide Opportunities on Organic Farms based in International University of Business Agriculture and Technology in 2010. He was the Secretary General of Association of Private Universities of Bangladesh. He signed an agreement with the University of Victoria on behalf of IUBAT.

== Bibliography ==
- Miyan, M Alimullah (2018), Knowledge Based Area Development (KBAD) (9th ed.), Dhaka, Bangladesh: International University of Business Agriculture and Technology
- Miẏāna, Mohāmmada Ālimaulyā.; Richards, John (2004). Energy policy for Bangladesh = Bāṃlādeśera jvālāni nīti. Dhaka: Centre for Policy Research, IUBAT. ISBN 984-8610-01-4. OCLC 60393010.

== Death and legacy ==
Miyan died on 10 May 2017 at Apollo Hospital Dhaka, Bangladesh. In the International University of Business Agriculture and Technology, a scholarship was created in memory of Miyan for one expert graduate from every village beneath neath Knowledge-Based Area Development (KBAD). M Allimullah Miyan Research Institute opened on January 1, 2019 in IUBAT. It organizes the research activity of the university including undergraduate research.
