= Meherpur University =

Public University in Meherpur, Bangladesh

- মেহেরপুর বিশ্ববিদ্যালয়
- Type: Public
- Established: 2023 (3 years ago)
- Affiliations: University Grants Commission (UGC)
- Chancellor: President Mirza Fakhrul Islam Alamgir
- Vice-Chancellor: Prof. Tozammel Hossain
- Location: Meherpur Sadar, Meherpur, 7110, Bangladesh
- Campus: 100 Acres(proposed); Rural
- Language: English, Bengali
- Website: https://www.mum.ac.bd

Meherpur University is a public university in Meherpur District. It is the 55th public university in Bangladesh.

Sheikh Hasina desired to establish a public university in every district of Bangladesh. Parliament passed the Mujibnagar University Act 2023 to establish a university at Meherpur District. It was proposed to be established as Mujibnagar University in honor of the provisional capital of Bangladesh during the War of Independence of Bangladesh.

Md. Rabiul Islam was appointed the university's first vice chancellor in November 2023.

== History ==
Prime Minister Sheikh Hasina desired to establish a public university in every district of Bangladesh. So parliament passed the Mujibnagar University Act 2023 to establish a university at Meherpur District. It was proposed to be established as Meherpur University but later it was proposed to be established as Mujibnagar University in honor of the provisional capital of Bangladesh during the War of Independence of Bangladesh.

Md. Rabiul Islam was appointed the university's first vice chancellor in November 2023.

On January 16, 2025, the interim Government of Bangladesh renamed the university to 'Meherpur University' from 'Mujibnagar University'.

== Administration ==
This university is now early stages of establishment.

== Academics ==
This university is now in the Final stages of establishment. Primarily 5 subjects has been sent to The University Grants Commission (UGC) for permit. From which 2 subjects will be allowed to open in the inaugural academic year.

A portion of Meherpur Govt. College has been selected as the temporary campus for the first session.

== See also ==
- University of Dhaka
- Bangladesh University of Engineering and Technology
- Jahangirnagar University
- University of Chittagong
- Bangladesh University of Textiles (BUTEX)
- Islamic University, Bangladesh
- Islamic University of Technology (IUT)
- List of universities in Bangladesh
- List of Islamic educational institutions
