= List of mosques in Rajshahi Division =

List of notable mosques in Rajshahi Division.

== Bogra district ==
- Kherua Mosque
- Central Baitur Rahman Mosque
- Mathurapur Central Jame Mosque
- Mahasthangarh Mosque

== Joypurhat district ==
- Hinda-Qasbah Shahi Mosque

== Naogaon district ==
- Kusumba Mosque

== Natore district ==
- Bhattapara Central Mosque

== Chapainawabganj district ==
- Choto Sona Mosque
- Khaniyadighi Mosque
- Darasbari Mosque

== Rajshahi district ==
- Bagha Mosque
- Kismat Maria Mosque

== Sirajganj district ==
- Al-Aman Bahela Khatun Mosque

== See also ==
- List of mosques in Dhaka Division
- List of mosques in Rangpur Division
- List of mosques in Khulna Division
- List of mosques in Chittagong Division
- List of mosques in Barisal Division
- List of mosques in Sylhet Division
- List of mosques in Mymensingh Division
