= German University Bangladesh =

Private university near Dhaka

- Other name: GUB
- Type: Private university
- Established: 2013
- Accreditation: University Grants Commission
- Chancellor: President Hafiz Uddin Ahmad
- Vice-Chancellor: Professor Sonjoy Kumar Adhikary
- Faculty: 38
- Location: Gazipur, Bangladesh
- Campus: Urban
- Website: gub.edu.bd

German University Bangladesh (GUB) is a private University in Bangladesh. It is affiliated to the University Grants Commission. The university has four faculties offering more than 25-degree programs. Professor Dr. Salamat Khandker, an official of the chairperson of the board of directors of German University Bangladesh.

== History ==
Saifullah Khandker, a Bangladeshi professor living in Germany, took the initiative to establish a German university in Bangladesh. His initial plan entailed establishing the university in Sagordighi, Ghatail in Tangail District. It was established in 2013 in Gazipur, Gazipur District. Saifullah Khandaker was the founding chairperson of the university.

In November 2016, the University Grants Commission said that certificates from the university would not be recognized due to the university having no vice-chancellor.

Professor Sonjoy Kumar Adhikary was appointed vice-chancellor of the University on 19 August 2025 by the President of Bangladesh Mohammed Shahabuddin. The pro-vice chancellors of the university are Thomas M. Klapoetke, Marie-Louise Klotz, Leo Brunnberg, and Cornelius Froemmel.

The University was closed indefinitely in May 2025 leading to protests by students.

== Undergraduate programs ==
- B.Sc. in Food Science & Engineering
- B.Sc. in Computer Science & Engineering
- B.Sc. Hons. in Bio-Technology
- Bachelor of Public Health
- BBA (Bachelor of Business Administration)
- BSS Hons. in Sociology (Bachelor in Sociology)
- BA Hons. in English (Bachelor in English)
- B.Sc. (Hons) in Environment Protection Technology

== See also ==
- Government University
- Private University
- National University
- List of universities in Bangladesh
