= Bidhan Chandra Das =

Professor Dr. Bidhan Chandra Das

2nd Vice-Chancellor

North Bengal International University
- In office 16 July 2023 – 1 June 2025
- Preceded by: Abdul Khaleque

Personal details
- Born: 1956 (age 69–70) Satkhira District, Bangladesh
- Education: University of Rajshahi; University of East Anglia
- Occupation: Professor, university administrator

Bidhan Chandra Das (born 1956) is a Bangladeshi zoologist. He is a retired professor of the Department of Zoology at the University of Rajshahi and served as the second Vice-Chancellor of North Bengal International University (NBIU).

== Education ==
Das obtained his Bachelor of Science (B.Sc.) degree in zoology in 1977 and Master of Science (M.Sc.) degree in 1978 from the University of Rajshahi. He earned a Ph.D. degree from University of Kalyani in India in 1988 and completed postdoctoral research at the University of East Anglia in the United Kingdom from 2005 to 2006.

== Career ==
Das joined the Department of Zoology at the University of Rajshahi as a lecturer in 1989. He was promoted to assistant professor in 1990, associate professor in 1996, and professor in 2001.

In addition to teaching and research, he held various administrative positions. He served as a member of the Senate of the University of Rajshahi from 1997 to 2001, administrator of the university's Central Library from 2010 to 2013, College Inspector from 2013 to 2016, and Chair of the Department of Zoology from 2021 to 2022. He retired from the University of Rajshahi in 2022.

Das was appointed Vice-Chancellor of North Bengal International University, a private university in Rajshahi, on 11 July 2023 and formally assumed office as the institution's second Vice-Chancellor on 16 July 2023. He served in the position until 1 June 2025.

On 19 August 2025, Das participated as a resource person at the National Green Coalition Conference 2025 in Rajshahi, where he shared his expertise on issues related to environmental conservation and biodiversity protection.

On 5 June 2026, Das delivered the keynote address at a discussion meeting and tree-planting programme held at the Rajshahi University of Engineering & Technology (RUET) to mark World Environment Day 2026.

== Research and discoveries ==
The Himalayas and the Sundarbans are among Das's principal fields of research. He has supervised 12 Ph.D. dissertations, one M.Phil. thesis, and numerous master's-level research projects. Approximately 80 of his research papers have been published in national and international journals. He has discovered 10 aphiddine species from the Western Himalayas, India and 1 eriophyid species from Bangladesh. He has also authored and edited several books.

Selected publications include (in Bengali):

- Dukher Timire Jwale (edited commemorative volume, 2004)
- Isaac Newton (2021)
- Bioethics: Theory, History and Application (2023)
- Marie Curie (2025)

== Honours ==
Das is a Fellow of the Zoological Society of Bangladesh.
