= Central University of Science and Technology =

Coordinates: 23.8039°N 90.3875°E

- সিইউএসটি
- Motto: An Industry Driven University in Bangladesh
- Type: Private
- Established: 24 February 2016; 10 years ago
- Affiliations: UGC
- Location: Mirpur, Dhaka, Bangladesh
- Campus: Plot: 1/9, Road: 2, Block: D, Section: 15, Mirpur, Dhaka-1216, Bangladesh
- Website: cust.ac.bd

Central University of Science & Technology (CUST) is a private university in Mirpur, Dhaka, Bangladesh. It is approved by the Government of Bangladesh and listed by the University Grants Commission (UGC) of Bangladesh.

== History ==
The government of Bangladesh approved the establishment, in the capital, Dhaka, of Central University of Science and Technology (CUST) on 24 February 2016 under the Private University Act 2010. CUST considers this its founding day.

== Schools and programs ==
Central University of Science & Technology currently operates undergraduate and postgraduate academic programs under two academic schools.

=== School of Computer Science and Information Technology ===
The school includes the Department of Computer Science and Engineering (CSE). The department currently offers the Bachelor of Science in Computer Science and Engineering (B.Sc. in CSE) program.

=== School of Business and Industrial Development ===
The school includes the Department of Business Administration. The department offers the Bachelor of Business Administration (BBA) and Master of Business Administration (MBA) programs.

According to the programs published by CUST, its principal academic programs include:

- Bachelor of Science in Computer Science and Engineering (B.Sc. in CSE)
- Bachelor of Business Administration (BBA)
- Master of Business Administration (MBA)

== See also ==
- List of universities in Bangladesh
