= Times University Bangladesh =

Bangladeshi university

- Type: Private
- Established: 2013
- Affiliations: University Grants Commission, Bangladesh Bar Council
- Chancellor: President Mohammed Shahabuddin
- Vice-Chancellor: Professor Dr. A.K.M. Salahuddin
- Location: West Goalchamot, Faridpur, Bangladesh; 23.5892°N 89.8330°E
- Campus: Urban
- Website: timesuniversitybd.com

Times University Bangladesh (TUB) is a private university in Bangladesh founded in 2013. Times University of Bangladesh is located in the medium city of Faridpur. TUB is officially recognized by the University Grants Commission of Bangladesh. TUB offers courses and programs leading to officially recognized higher education degrees in several areas of study.
