= IBAIS University =

Private university in Bangladesh

- Motto: Committed to Ensure International Standard Education
- Type: Private
- Established: January 1995; 31 years ago
- Affiliations: University Grants Commission Bangladesh
- Chancellor: President Mirza Fakhrul Islam Alamgir
- Vice-Chancellor: Mohammed Ahsan Ullah
- Location: Dhaka, Bangladesh; 23.7544°N 90.3726°E
- Campus: Urban
- Website: www.ibais.org

IBAIS University (Bengali: ইবাইস ইউনিভার্সিটি, IBAIS: International Business Administration and Information System) is a private educational institution in Bangladesh. On November 28, 2024, the University Grants Commission of Bangladesh (UGC) announced in a notice that, due to the expiration of its temporary permission, IBAIS University has no legal basis for its operations under Section 12(1) of the Private University Act, 2010. The university has no approved campus, address, or legitimate authorities (Vice-Chancellor, Pro-Vice-Chancellor, or Treasurer). Additionally, due to disputes within the Board of Trustees and ongoing court cases, there is no legal validity for the university's academic, administrative, or financial activities, including admissions, examinations, results, and academic certificates issued.

== Faculties/Department ==
=== Faculty of Humanities & Law ===
- Department of English
- Department of Tourism & Hotel Management
- Department of Law

=== Faculty of Business & Economics ===
- Department of Business Administration
- Department of Economics

=== Faculty of Science & Engineering ===
- Department of Computer Science & Engineering
- Department of Electrical & Electronic Engineering
- Department of Electrical, Electronics & Telecommunication Engineering
- Department of Electrical Engineering
- Department of Mechanical Engineering
- Department of Civil and Environmental Engineering

=== Institutes ===
Center for Research & Training

== List of vice-chancellors ==
- Mohammed Ahsan Ullah (present)

== Academic calendar ==
The academic system of IBAISU consists with three semesters:

- Spring semester
- Summer semester
- Fall semester
