= Universities in Bangladesh =

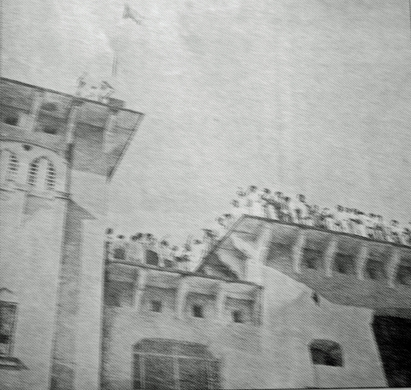
Dhaka University, the first university in Bangladesh (image dated 1952)

Universities in Bangladesh represent about 150 academic bodies of the conventional higher education institution (HEI) in Bangladesh. Segmented by management and financial structure, these include 55 public universities, 103 private universities, 3 international universities, 31 specialized colleges, and 2 special universities. There are specialized universities in both categories offering courses principally in technological studies, medical studies, business studies and Islamic studies. There are two private universities dedicated solely to female students. The number of universities is growing mostly in and around the capital city of Dhaka.

There are about 1688 colleges organized under the umbrella of Bangladesh National University – one of the largest in the world. The Open University offers distance learning courses. There is a parallel religious high-ed education system. And amongst private higher education institutions, the Universal College Bangladesh is the pioneer of bringing together world's best universities such as Monash College Pathway program and London School of Economics and Political Science in Bangladesh, where you can obtain foreign degree from the Dhaka city campus.

The University Grants Commission of Bangladesh (UGC) is the regulatory body of all the public (government funded) and private universities of Bangladesh. The Private University Act (PUA) of 1992 paved the way for vigorous sprouting of private universities. 80% of its universities are in their infancy. M Alimullah Miyan founded the first private university, IUBAT in Bangladesh under the PUA in 1992. There is a severed shortage in higher education capacity. The country is yet to have any research and education network (REN) or digital library consortium (DLC).

== Public universities ==
Bangladesh has 55 public universities instructing the bulk of higher studies students. They that are funded by the government and managed as self-governed government institutions.

== Private universities ==
Private universities in Bangladesh came into being after institution of the Private University Act of 1992. As of 2025, over 116 of them had started. These universities follow an open credit system.

=== Criticism and controversy ===
There has been much controversy around the private universities and their practices. Eleven universities went operational without a UGC approval which was made a necessity under the Private University Act (1992). Twenty-seven private universities were found running without a vice-chancellor. Ten universities were issued a deadline of one year from the UGC to improve qualities. Eight universities the UGC of Bangladesh recommended for shutting down due to poor quality of academic standards. Some were served with show-cause notice by judicial authorities asking why it would not be closed down. At least eleven private universities introduced new academic courses without UGC approval. Others were found to deliver instructions in unauthorized courses and have illegal campuses.

== Other universities and specialized colleges ==
- Bangladesh Open University
- Bangladesh National University

== See also ==
- List of universities in Bangladesh
- M Alimullah Miyan
- University Grants Commission of Bangladesh
