= Brahmaputra International University =

Bangladeshi private university in Jamalpur

- ব্রহ্মপুত্র ইন্টারন্যাশনাল ইউনিভার্সিটি
- Former name: Sheikh Fazilatunnesa Mujib University
- Type: Private
- Established: 2013
- Chancellor: President Mirza Fakhrul Islam Alamgir
- Vice-Chancellor: Kamal Uddin Ahmed
- Location: Jamalpur, Bangladesh; 24°56′15″N 89°56′27″E
- Campus: Medical Road, Foujdari Moor, Jamalpur 2000 Urban
- Website: briu.ac.bd

Brahmaputra International University, the first and only private university of Mymensingh division, is situated in Jamalpur District, Bangladesh.

== History ==
After the fall of the Sheikh Hasina-led Awami League administration, Sheikh Fazilatunnesa Mujib University was renamed to Brahmaputra International University.

== Faculties and departments ==
=== Science Faculty ===
- Computer science and engineering (CSE)
- Electrical & Electronic Engineering (EEE)

=== Faculty of Arts and Social Sciences ===
- English
- Law (LL.B.)
- Economics
- Political Science
- Fine arts
- Diploma in Library Management and Information Science

=== Faculty of Business Administration ===
- BBA (Bachelor of Business Administration)
- Accounting
- Banking and Finance
- Management
