= Satkhira University of Science and Technology =

Public university in Satkhira, Bangladesh

- সাতক্ষীরা বিজ্ঞান ও প্রযুক্তি বিশ্ববিদ্যালয়
- Other names: SSTU
- Type: Public, Research university
- Established: 2023; 3 years ago
- Affiliations: University Grants Commission (UGC)
- Chancellor: President Mohammed Shahabuddin
- Location: Satkhira, 9400, Bangladesh
- Campus: Urban
- Language: English, Bengali

Satkhira University of Science and Technology (Bengali: সাতক্ষীরা বিজ্ঞান ও প্রযুক্তি বিশ্ববিদ্যালয়), commonly known as SSTU, is a public university in Satkhira. It is the second science and technology university in Khulna Division. It was established by the Bangladesh Parliament through the Satkhira University of Science and Technology Act 2023.

== History ==
The people of this town have been demanding for a long time to establish a university in Satkhira district, which is affected by natural disasters in the southwestern part of the country.

Various organizations, including the Satkhira District Citizens' Committee, drew the attention of the government in various ways, including holding meetings, presenting memorandums, for the establishment of the university. Former Health Minister AFM Ruhal Haque and local public representatives presented the issue in the Parliament at various times. On behalf of the Satkhira District Citizens Committee, the then District Commissioner SM Mustafa Kamal presented the demand for the establishment of a university along with various demands for the development of Satkhira. Later, Deputy Commissioner SM Mustafa Kamal highlighted the rationale for establishing the university in the fortnightly confidential report of the Field Administration Liaison Division of the Cabinet Division. On March 7, 2021, Prime Minister Sheikh Hasina gave the nod to the proposal for the construction of the Science and Technology University at Satkhira. Since then the official process of establishing a university in Satkhira started.

On November 2, 2023, the 25th and last session of the 11th National Parliament passed the 'Satkhira University of Science and Technology Bill, 2023'. Former education minister Dipu Moni presented the bill.

== Campus ==
The campus of this university is not prepared yet.

== Academic ==
The university is still in the establishment process.

== See also ==
- Satkhira Medical College
- Khulna University
- Jashore University of Science and Technology
- Khulna University of Engineering & Technology
- Islamic University, Bangladesh
- Sheikh Hasina Medical University, Khulna
