= Narayanganj Science and Technology University =

Public University in Narayanganj, Bangladesh

Narayanganj University of Science and Technology
- নারায়ণগঞ্জ বিজ্ঞান ও প্রযুক্তি বিশ্ববিদ্যালয়
- Type: Public university
- Established: 2023; 3 years ago
- Affiliations: University Grants Commission of Bangladesh
- Chancellor: President Mirza Fakhrul Islam Alamgir
- Location: Narayanganj, Bangladesh
- Nickname: NGSTU

Narayanganj University of Science and Technology is a public university located in Narayanganj, Bangladesh.

== History ==
The Ministry of Education of the Government of Bangladesh approved the establishment of the university on 9 December 2020. In 2023, the Cabinet of Bangladesh and Jatiya Sangsad approved the law for the university.

On January 16, 2025, the interim government of Bangladesh changed the name of the university from Father of the Nation Bangabandhu Sheikh Mujibur Rahman University of Science and Technology, Narayanganj to Narayanganj Science and Technology University. On May 18, 2025, the UGC stated in its press release that no activities of this university have yet started. It warned that a fake website (https://ngstu.ac) had been created for the university.
