= Millennium University =

Coordinates: 23.7421°N 90.4185°E

The Millennium University
- Type: Private
- Established: 2003
- Chancellor: President Mirza Fakhrul Islam Alamgir
- Vice-Chancellor: Abhinaya Chandra Saha
- Location: Dhaka, Bangladesh
- Campus: Momenbag, Dhaka
- Website: www.themillenniumuniversity.edu.bd

The Millennium University (Bengali: মিলেনিয়াম বিশ্ববিদ্যালয় or Bengali: দি মিলেনিয়াম ইউনিভার্সিটি), often abbreviated as TMU, is a non-governmental university located at Dhaka, Bangladesh. The university is sponsored by Khan Foundation (formerly Abdul Momen Khan Memorial Foundation), a Philanthropic Private Development Organisation (PVDO) in Special Consultative Status to the United Nations Economic and Social Council, named after former Minister of Food and founding member of the Bangladesh Nationalist Party, Abdul Momen Khan. It was established under the Private University Act 1992. It is affiliated to the Government of Bangladesh and overseen by the University Grants Commission Bangladesh.

The main campus of TMU is situated at Momenbagh, Dhaka 1217, Bangladesh in the heart of the city. TMU is one of the few private universities in the country having its own campus under the Khan Foundation, which cuts down per capita education cost for students by saving rental and other overhead cost for TMU.

University admission is under UGC guidelines. Admission tests are conducted to select students on the basis of academic background, merit, and potential, through assessments and interactive sessions.

== Academics ==
TMU offers the following graduate and undergraduate programs:

- Bachelor of Business Administration
- Master of Business Administration (Executive and Regular)
- B.Sc. in Information and Communication Technology
- M.Sc. in Information and Communication Technology
- B.Sc. in Computer Science and Engineering
- B.Pharm. in Pharmacy
- B.A. in English
- M.A. in English
- L.L.B. in Law
- L.L.M. in Law
