= International University of Business Agriculture and Technology =

First private university in Bangladesh

- ইন্টারন্যাশনাল ইউনিভার্সিটি অব বিজনেস এগ্রিকালচার অ্যান্ড টেকনোলজি
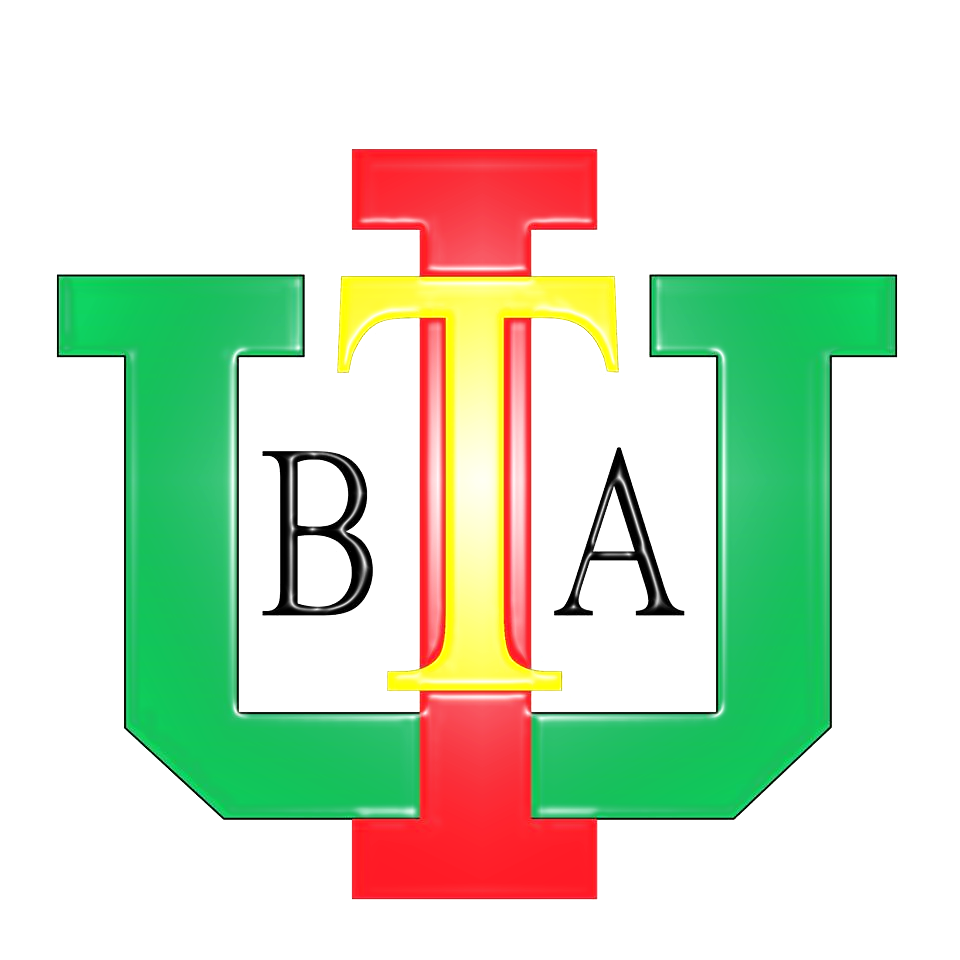
- Motto: An Environment Designed For Learning
- Type: Private research university
- Established: 1991
- Founder: M Alimullah Miyan
- Accreditation: Institution of Engineers, Bangladesh; Association of Commonwealth Universities; Krishibid Institution Bangladesh; Washington Accord
- Affiliations: University Grants Commission (UGC)
- Chancellor: President Mirza Fakhrul Islam Alamgir
- Vice-Chancellor: Abdur Rab
- Academic staff: 261
- Students: 7,992
- Undergraduates: 7,792
- Postgraduates: 199
- Doctoral students: 15
- Location: 4 Embankment Drive Road, Sector-10, Uttara, Dhaka, Bangladesh; 23.8883°N 90.3909°E
- Campus: Urban
- Language: English
- Colors: Green White Maroon
- Website: www.iubat.edu

University rankings

Global – Overall
- QS World: 1401+ (2026)

Regional – Overall
- QS Asia: 644 (2026)

International University of Business Agriculture and Technology (IUBAT) was established in 1991 by M Alimullah Miyan and was subsequently recognized under the Private University Act (PUA) of 1992 (now replaced by PUA 2010). It is the first private university established in Bangladesh. The initial planning began in 1989. Degree programs started in 1992 with agreement with Assumption University of Bangkok, Thailand. IUBAT is a full member of the Association of Commonwealth Universities, London, and this extended formal recognition of IUBAT degrees in 35 countries or regions of the Commonwealth.

== Campus ==
IUBAT has a permanent campus with 20 Bighas of land at 4 Embankment Drive Road, Off Dhaka-Ashulia Road, Sector-10, Uttara Model Town, Dhaka 1230.

== Faculties ==
=== Faculty of Engineering and Technology ===
- Department of Computer Science and Engineering
  - Bachelor of Computer Science and Engineering (BCSE) (Engineers Institution Bangladesh)
  - M.Sc. in Computer Science and Engineering
  - Diploma in Computer Science and Engineering
- Department of Civil Engineering
  - Bachelor of Science in Civil Engineering (Engineers Institution Bangladesh)
  - M.Sc. in Civil Engineering
- Department of Electrical and Electronic Engineering
  - Bachelor of Science in Electrical and Electronic Engineering (BSEEE)(Engineers Institution Bangladesh)
- Department of Mechanical Engineering
  - Bachelor of Science in Mechanical Engineering (BSME)

=== Faculty of Agriculture ===
- Bachelor of Science in Agriculture (BSAg)

=== Faculty of Business Administration ===
- Bachelor of Business Administration (BBA)
- Master of Business Administration (MBA)

=== Faculty of Nursing ===
- Bachelor of Science in Nursing (Bangladesh Nursing Council Approved)

=== Faculty of Public Health ===
- Master of Public Health (MPH)

=== Faculty of Tourism and Hospitality Management ===
- Bachelor of Arts Tourism and Hospitality Management (BATHM)

=== Faculty of Arts and Science ===
- Bachelor of Arts in Economics
- Bachelor of Arts in English

== Gallery ==
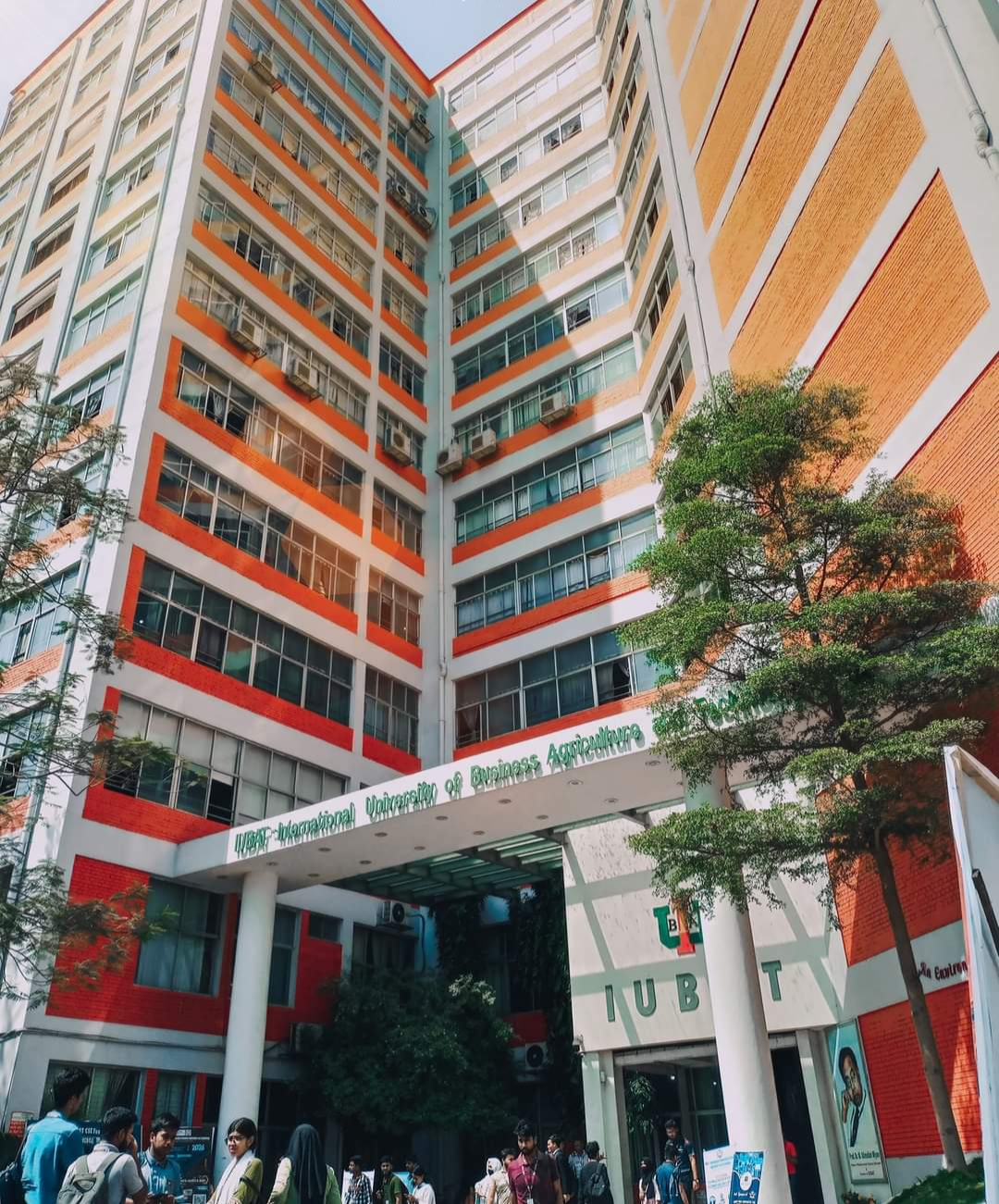
Academic Building

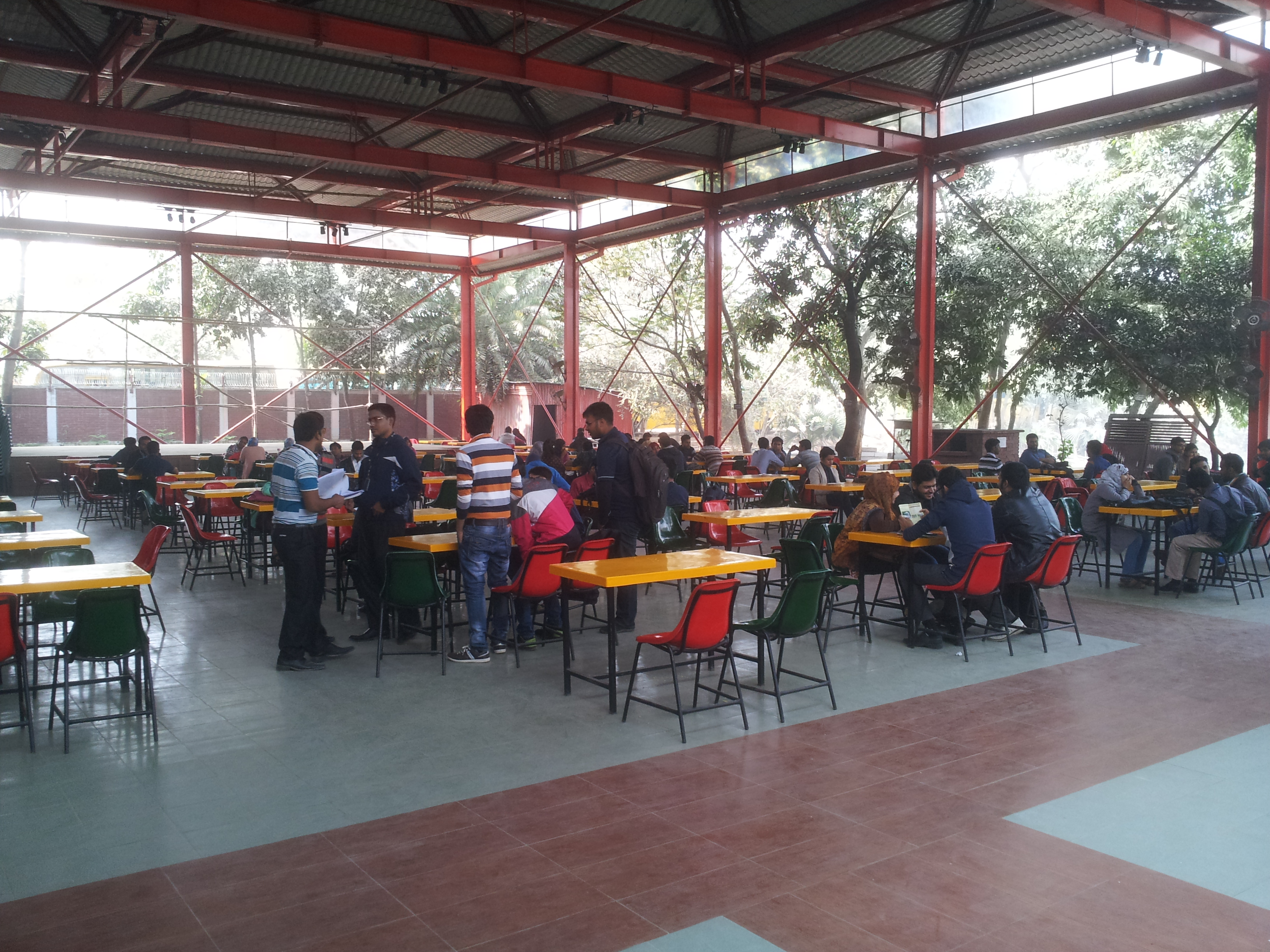
Auditorium

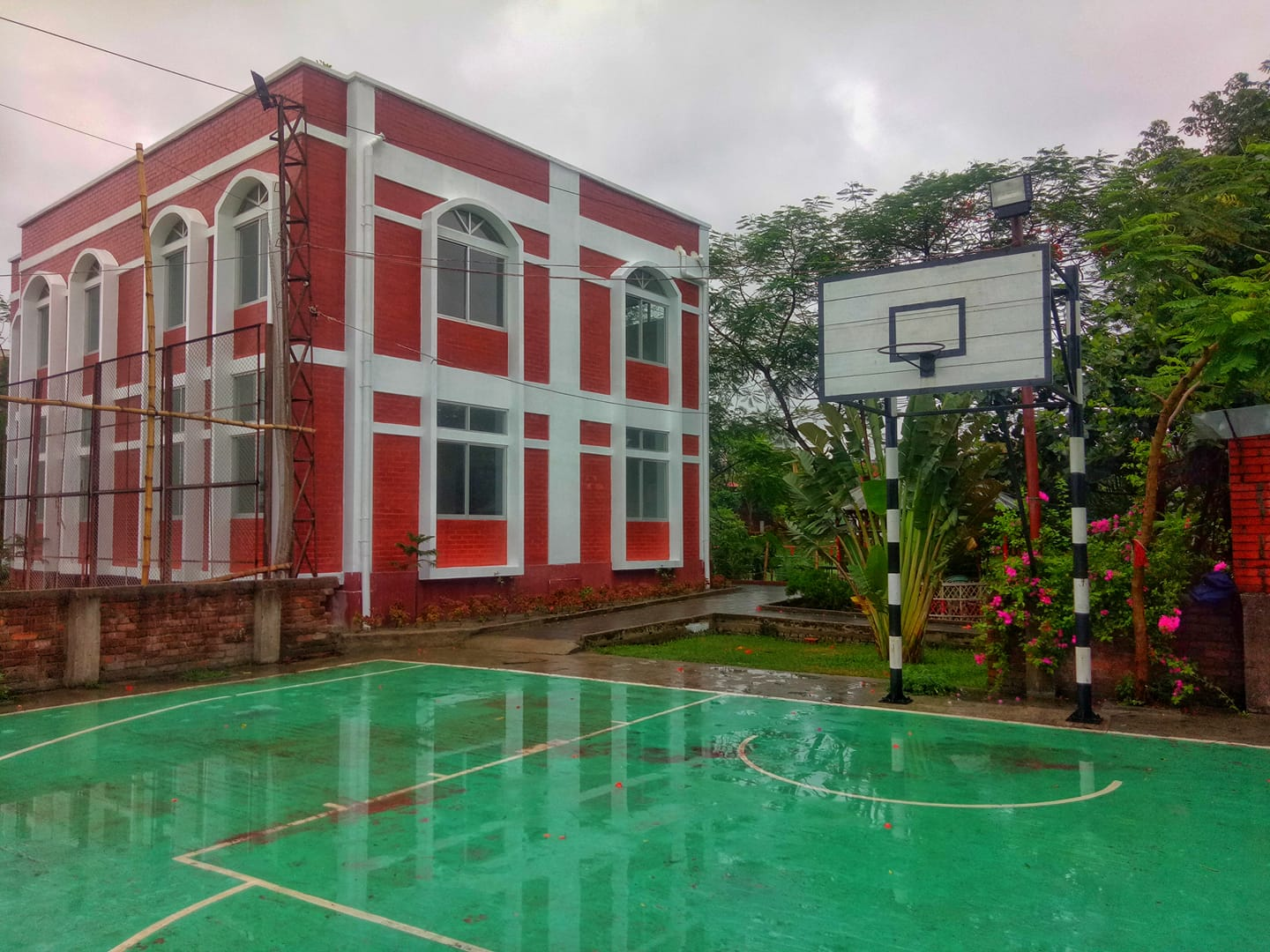
Mosque and Basketball court
