= NASA Space Universe =

American punk rock band

- Origin: Santa Ana, California, California United States
- Genres: Punk rock, hardcore punk, noise rock, experimental rock
- Years active: 2006–January 16, 2016
- Labels: Shogun Records, Gradual Limbo Records, Funky Brewski
- Members: John Cardwell, Kevin Hermes, Paul Kubacek, Kevin Rhea

NASA Space Universe (or NSU) were an American punk rock band from Santa Ana, California, United States, who originally formed in 2006.

== History ==
=== 2006–2007 ===
After the collapse of controversial, experimental Santa Ana Art electropunk band Zoophilia, Kevin Hermes (Drums), and Kevin Rhea (Vocals) joined with John Cardwell (Guitar), whom they had worked with prior in the SCHS (Santa Claus Hypnosis Show). NSU starting as a Pyramid Scheme system, Punk crime group, and Socio-political project. After a group viewing of Videodrome and all having a connection that particular viewing, they then later played to what videodrome had influenced them to play that particular night. Soon after the Socio-political project was transformed to the current punk rock incarnation of NASA Space Universe . In the summer of 2006 they met Paul Kubasek of Noise Rock band Ex Oblivione during a Zoophilia show at The Smell Two months later they became a quartet and started playing shows in the Southern California Area.

=== 2008–2010 ===
After continuous touring, their first release was a self titled extended play on Gradual Limbo Records. NSU started to play more notable shows including the Smell's 10th anniversary, and a concert on a boat. This followed with a tour of the Pacific Northwest with Okie Dokie a Cal Arts band featuring a then student Mikal Cronin. For much of the year NSU played numerous shows for Sean Carnage Mondays, Don Bolles' Club Ding-a-ling, as well as numerous warehouses, generator shows, and fringe venues. Despite the Reverb heavy punk movement of the Los Angeles scene NSU, had continued their abstract punk sound and played with many bands such as xbxrx, White Lung, Shearing Pinx, Mika Miko, White Flag, The Urinals, and Saccharine Trust. NSU had also been played on several punk and independent radios as Nardwuar's WFMU show, Razorcake, Maximumrockandroll, and KXLU's Demolisten, as well as performing live on air. The Release and constant touring eventually caught the attention of many critics and fans including Kyle H. Mabson, V. Vale, and White Flag. The Second EP Brainrailers would then be recorded by Vic Alfaro of Christian Death Fame, and released by French label Shogun Records in April 2010.

=== 2011–2012 ===
Shortly after the release of Brainrailers, NSU quickly went to recording work for their debut full-length release Across the Wounded Galaxies to be released on Shogun Records. A Nationwide Tour of California to New Orleans, Louisiana was had for the release. By 2012 Through playing numerous shows, and with constant touring including another Winter Pacific Northwest Tour, NSU's whole catalog had sold out, and American represses were announced.

Their debut album received positive reviews internationally, with United Kingdom paper The Quietus recommending the band, with the comment that "Musically, their high-pitched wall-of-jangle/atonal solo approach has earned them plenty of Die Kreuzen comparisons, which have merit, but I’m equally reminded of the collective mentality of those mid-Eighties Ron Johnson Records bands, only with a hardcore upbringing."

In June 2012, NSU along with Manager Alan S. Tofghi embarked on a second Nationwide Tour in support of the Ice EP, Treated Versions of Various songs in Various Speeds, and the Tour Documentary "Van Warped Tour Death Drive", Directed by Longtime NSU associate Vincent Catanho. With both items selling out prior to tours end, NSU had successfully completed the Bi-Coastal tour.

== Musical and lyrical style ==
Drawing from Science-Fiction, Philip K. Dick, Cosmicism, after death preservation, and H.P. Lovecraft K- Rhea's lyrical delivery is often carried with a Jerry Falwell delivery, and has been described as "speaking in tongues". Musically influenced by Japanese hardcore, SST, Funk, Noise music, and containing syncopated drum beats, Cowpunk and Free Jazz guitar licks, along with a constant start stop song aesthetic.

== Live setting and performances ==
NASA Space Universe's unusual performance style drew comment from UK paper The Guardian, who remarked on the "chaotic shows in unusual locations and unusual clothes" in calling out the band to exemplify a wave of "interesting, uncompromising and just plain bonkers" punk bands. The latter praising NSU's credibility compared to other contemporary bands.

Coming from a DIY punk ethic, NSU rarely use a stage, even when one is provided. Constant audience participation has been a part of the NSU live show, which can include group reciting of curses, sacrificial consumption, desecration of objects, handing out texts, and various topic based actions. Copious amounts of receipt tape and books have also been a part of the NSU aesthetic, often at times with the whole audience being covered in receipt tape, and the floor unseen.

As of 2011 Video Projections have been an ever present force via a Self rigged projector. The subject usually containing various film collages nearly untraceable in obscurity.

Apart from playing generator shows, art galleries, and overpasses, they have also played on a boat on the Long Beach coast, along with many often regarded unconventional settings.

At The Smell, a wall of aluminum foil was created, in which the back of the wall would be shined on by full stage lights. The options would be either to stay behind the wall and face a twelve-foot glare, or view the band who were positioned in a configuration facing the stage. as a result, those who wanted to avoid slamming would stand on the stage while all others would be on the floor level with the band.

== Members ==
- Kevin Rhea – vocals (2006–2016)
- John Cardwell – guitar (2006–2016)
- Kevin Hermes – drums, percussion (2006–2016)
- Paul Kubasek – bass, backing vocals (2007–2016)

== Discography ==
=== Albums ===
- Across the Wounded Galaxies (2011)
- 70 AD (2016)

=== EPs ===
- NASA Space Universe (2008)
- Brainrailers EP (2010)
- Secret Sins (2011)
- Ice EP (2012)
- EGM EP (2013)
