= Lakshmipur Science and Technology University =

Government financed public university of Bangladesh

Lakshmipur Science & Technology University
- লক্ষ্মীপুর বিজ্ঞান ও প্রযুক্তি বিশ্ববিদ্যালয়
- Type: Public university
- Established: 2023; 3 years ago
- Chancellor: President Mirza Fakhrul Islam Alamgir
- Vice-Chancellor: Dr. Mohammad Hanif Murad
- Location: Charshahi, Chandragonj, Sadar, Lakshmipur

Lakshmipur Science & Technology University (Bengali: লক্ষ্মীপুর বিজ্ঞান ও প্রযুক্তি বিশ্ববিদ্যালয়) is a government financed public university of Bangladesh.

== History ==
In 2017, at a public rally in Lakshmipur District Stadium Sheikh Hasina, the former prime minister of Bangladesh announced that, "We build a Science & Technology University in Lakshmipur."

After three years, Cabinet Ministry approved "Lakshmipur Science & Technology University Bill - 2018".

== List of vice-chancellors ==
- Dr. Mohammad Hanif Murad
