= Helsinki School of Business =

Finnish private university

- Type: Private
- Established: 2012
- President: Kari Jääskeläinen
- Location: Helsinki, Finland; 60°11′23″N 24°54′49″E
- Language: English
- Website: helbus.com

Helsinki School of Business (HELBUS) is a private university located in Helsinki, Finland. The school offers a bachelor's degree in business and management (BA Hons) and an MBA in partnership with the University of Northampton, an institution governed by QAA, the official British quality agency for higher education. As an added-value offering, undergraduate students at HELBUS also earn the Higher National Diploma (HND) in Business (BTEC Level 5) as part of their regular studies. Students are able to take courses full-time, or via the online programme.

HELBUS was founded in 2012 by Veikko Jääskeläinen, the former rector of Helsinki School of Economics and Business Administration, and Kari Jääskeläinen. The school achieved accreditation from Edexcel in August 2013 and established its current partnership with the University of Northampton in 2016.
