= Victoria University of Bangladesh =

- Type: Private
- Established: 2003
- Affiliations: UGC
- Chancellor: President Mohammed Shahabuddin
- Academic staff: 41
- Students: 510
- Location: Dhaka, Bangladesh; 23.7506°N 90.3884°E
- Campus: Urban
- Website: vub.edu.bd

Victoria University of Bangladesh (VUB) (Bengali: ভিক্টোরিয়া বিশ্ববিদ্যালয়) is a private university located in Dhaka, Bangladesh. It was established in May 2003. In January 2023, the University Grants Commission (UGC) asked it to stop admitting new students because of its failure to move to a permanent campus within the statutory period.

== History ==
Victoria University of Bangladesh was founded in May 2003 by businessman K B M Moin Uddin Chisty. Instruction began with the Spring 2004 semester in two faculties.

By 2018, the university had three faculties with a total of nine departments, and enrollment was 510. Approximately 60% of students were pursuing degrees in business administration, 25% in arts and humanities, and 15% in engineering and technology. About one quarter of the students were female.

Private universities are required by law to move to a permanent campus within 12 years of their launch. VUB failed to do so, despite repeated warnings from the UGC and extensions of the deadline. Consequently, in January 2023, the UGC asked the university to stop enrolling new students. In April 2023, VUB was operating with no approved vice-chancellor, pro-vice-chancellor, or treasurer.

== Faculties and departments ==
The university has three faculties:

=== Faculty of Business and Management ===
- Department of Business Administration
  - Bachelor of Business Administration (Honours) (126 credits)
- Department of Tourism and Hospitality Management
  - Bachelor of Tourism and Hospitality Management (Honours) (126 credits)

=== Faculty of Arts and Humanities ===
- Department of Education
- Department of English
  - Bachelor of Arts (Honours) in English (120 credits)

=== Faculty of Science ===
- Department of Computer Science and Engineering

== List of vice-chancellors ==
- Asit Roy Choudhury (–2022)
