= World Marketing Summit =

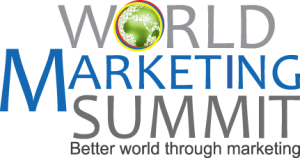
- Formation: 2011
- Type: Non-profit organization
- Headquarters: Toronto, Canada
- Region served: Worldwide
- Official language: English
- Leader: Philip Kotler
- Website: www.worldmarketingsummitgroup.org

The World Marketing Summit (WMS) is an independent global organization, headquartered in Toronto, Canada.

The World Marketing Summit was founded and convened in 2011 by Philip Kotler. It aims to initiate global movements through marketing strategies that change human behaviour leading to a positive impact on society and living for future generations.

WMS organizes an annual Summit conference which aims to bring brought global experts to discuss the most pressing issues faced by world, including marketing, business and economics impacting poverty, health and the environment.

== History ==
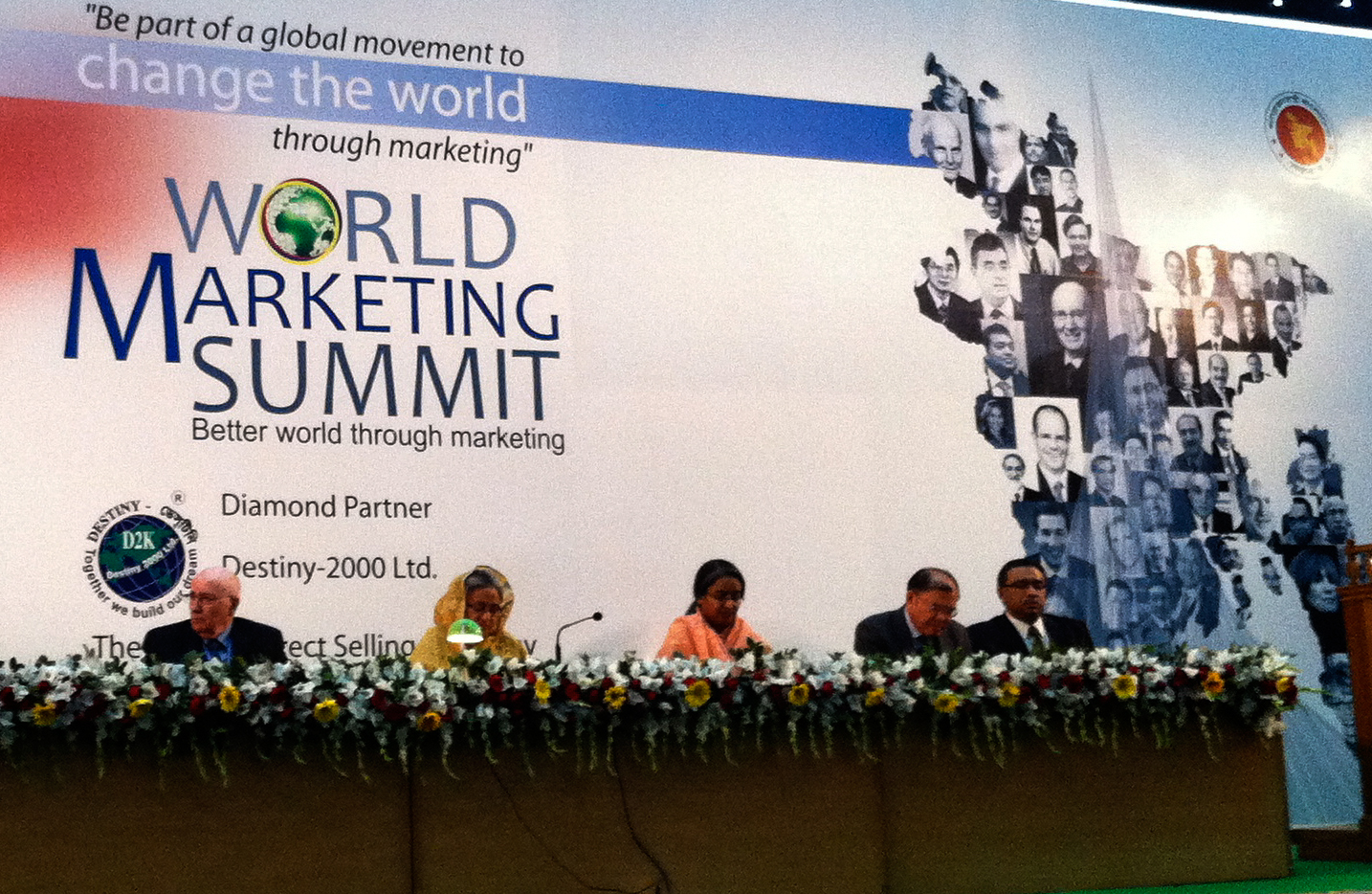
World Marketing Summit 2012 in Dhaka, Bangladesh

World Marketing Summit was founded in 2011 by Philip Kotler, an American marketing professor, author and consultant; currently the S. C. Johnson Distinguished Professor of International Marketing at the Kellogg School of Management at Northwestern University.

Kotler attended a seminar in Abu Dhabi in which he first shared the idea of forming a forum of marketers who can contribute towards alleviating poverty. Later, this idea was shared with other associates in Canada and Bangladesh and finally evolved into a tangible concept. The concept gave birth to World Marketing Summit in 2012 in Dhaka, Bangladesh under the patronage of the Government of Bangladesh in collaboration with Bangladesh Brand Forum.

== Organization ==
Headquartered in Toronto, Canada, World Marketing Summit has country representatives around the globe. It strives to be neutral and unbiased, and is not tied to any political, partisan or national interests.

WMS is led by a Board of Directors, an Advisory Board; represented by 15 prominent personalities from academia, research, business sectors, and international organizations including UN bodies. Philip Kotler is the founder, chairperson, convener and chief advisor of WMS.

== Activities ==
WMS has a number of activities on marketing and business which includes seminars, research, publications, academic courses and programs.

=== Annual Summit ===
The flagship event of the organization is the annual meeting on marketing, held every year since 2012. The first summit was held in Dhaka, Bangladesh, on March 1–3, 2012 (WMS 2012). The three-day summit was inaugurated by Sheikh Hasina, Prime Minister of the People’s Republic of Bangladesh and brought together 60 global experts and attracted 4,000 participants. Speakers from America, Europe, Asia and Africa representing universities, research agencies, multi-national business organizations, United Nations bodies, and financial institutions discussed pressing issues, including marketing, business and economics impacting poverty, health and the environment. Some of the experts who presented papers to the summit were Philip Kotler, Syed Saad Andaleeb, Mitchell Habib, Laura Ries, Abraham Koshy, Alan Andreasen, Gerald Hastings, Don Schultz, Hermann Simon, Hermawan Kartajaya, Craig Lefebvre, Imad Baalbaki and Milton Kotler. WMS 2012 was closed with the formulation of the "Dhaka Declaration".

The second summit (WMS 2013) was held in Kuala Lumpur on September 28–30, 2013.

The third summit (WMS 2014) was held in Tokyo, Japan on September 24–25, 2014.

The fourth summit (WMS 2015) was held in Tokyo, Japan on October 13–14, 2015.

=== Journal: Better World ===
Better World is the biannual journal of WMS (January and July) for business managers, academicians and researchers working in the areas of marketing and economics for alleviating poverty. WMS encourages articles covering diverse areas, industries, geographic locations and cultures which specifically focus on such areas as research, strategy, communication, pricing, distribution, sales, and leadership. Articles should be based on research analysis, theoretical insights, and practical experience so that the ideas presented there can be implemented.

=== Research ===
With a view to initiate global movements through marketing strategies, WMS has undertaken the Incubator concept of carrying out research on health, food, climate change and education in different countries and developing a marketing model in line with Millennium Development Goals (MDGs). The main objective of the incubator approach is to formulate a conceptual framework driven by marketing principles and implement the findings in a real world scenario. Each incubator will have a mix of partners that will contribute both a theoretical point of view as well as a practical point of view. The research wing of WMS actively collaborates with world’s leading experts from universities, business chambers, think tanks and other research-based organizations help developing business and academic model.

== See also ==
- Philip Kotler
- Globalization
- Millennium Development Goals
