= North Bengal International University =

Private university in Bangladesh

Coordinates: 24.3631°N 88.6047°E

- নর্থ বেঙ্গল ইন্টারন্যাশনাল ইউনিভার্সিটি
- Seal of North Bengal International University
- Other name: NBIU
- Type: Private
- Established: 2013
- Founder: Rasheda Khaleque
- Affiliations: University Grants Commission Bangladesh
- Chancellor: President Mirza Fakhrul Islam Alamgir
- Vice-Chancellor: M Sayedur Rahman
- Academic staff: 80
- Administrative staff: 40
- Students: 1236+
- Location: Motihar, Rajshahi, Bangladesh
- Campus: 0.6347 acres (0.2569 ha); Urban
- Colors
- Website: nbiu.edu.bd

North Bengal International University or NBIU (Bengali: নর্থ বেঙ্গল ইন্টারন্যাশনাল ইউনিভার্সিটি) is a private university established on 15 September 2013 in Matihar, Rajshahi, Bangladesh. The university was founded by Rasheda Khaleque, and founder vice chancellor of the university is Abdul Khaleque. The university is recognised by the University Grants Commission of Bangladesh. Shama Obaid is the chairman of the board of trustees at the university.

== Vice-Chancellors ==
- Abdul Khaleque (2014 - 2022)
- Bidhan Chandra Das (2023 - 2025)
- M Sayedur Rahman (2026 - present)

== Campus ==
=== Permanent campus ===
- Choddopai, Natore Road, Binodpur Bazar-6206, Motihar, Rajshahi, Bangladesh

== Faculty ==
=== Undergraduate programs ===
- Department of Electrical and Electronic Engineering: BSC in EEE (4-Year) 146 Credit
- Department of Computer Science and Engineering: BSC in CSE (4-Year) 156 Credit
- Department of Business Studies: BBA (4-Year) 132 Credit
- Department of Law: LLB (Honors, 4-Year) 123 Credit
- Department of Communication & Journalism Studies: BSS (Honors, 4-Year) 123 Credit
- Department of Folklore & Bangladesh Studies: BSS (Honors, 4-Year) 123 Credit
- Department of Sociology: BSS (Honors, 4-Year) 123 Credit
- Department of Political Science: BSS (Honors, 4-Year) 123 Credit
- Department of English: B.A (Honors, 4-Year) 123 Credit
- Department of Bangla: B.A (Honors, 4-Year) 123 Credit
- Department of Islamic History & Culture: B.A (Honors, 4-Year) 123 Credit
- Department of Islamic Studies: B.A (Honors, 4-Year) 123 Credit

=== Graduate programs ===
- Department of Business Studies: MBA (1-Year) 36 Credit, MBA (2-Year) 63 Credit, EMBA (Executive) 48 Credit
- Department of Law: LLM (1-Year) 33 Credit, LLM (2-Year) 60 Credit
- Department of Sociology: MSS (1-Year) 33 Credit, MSS (2-Year) 60 Credit
- Department of Political Science: MSS (1-Year) 33 Credit, MSS (2-Year) 60 Credit
- Department of English: MA (1-Year) 33 Credit, MA (2-Year) 60 Credit
- Department of Bangla: MA (1-Year) 33 Credit, MA (2-Year) 60 Credit
- Department of Islamic History & Culture: MA (1-Year) 33 Credit, MA (2-Year) 60 Credit
- Department of Islamic Studies: MA (1-Year) 33 Credit, MA (2-Year) 60 Credit

== Facilities ==
AC Classrooms with Multimedia, WiFi & Broadband Internet, Digital Sound System Conference Room, e-Library, CCTV Security System, NBIU Cafe, TSC, EEE Lab, CSE Lab, Networking Lab, Generators and others.
