= Bangladesh Army University of Engineering & Technology =

Private University in Natore, Bangladesh

- বাংলাদেশ সেনাবাহিনী প্রকৌশল ও প্রযুক্তি বিশ্ববিদ্যালয়
- Motto: Knowledge & Technology
- Type: Private
- Established: 15 February 2015; 11 years ago
- Academic affiliations: University Grants Commission
- Chairman: Chief of Army Staff
- Chancellor: President Hafiz Uddin Ahmad
- Vice-Chancellor: Brigadier General S M Lutfor Rahman
- Students: 3200+
- Location: Qadirabad Cantonment, Natore, Rajshahi, Bangladesh; 24.2771°N 89.0133°E
- Campus: Rural, over 11 acres (4.5 ha)
- Website: bauet.ac.bd

Bangladesh Army University of Engineering & Technology (BAUET) (Bengali: বাংলাদেশ সেনাবাহিনী প্রকৌশল ও প্রযুক্তি বিশ্ববিদ্যালয়) is a specialized private institution established under the Private University Act 2010 of Bangladesh.

While operated by the Bangladesh Army through the Army Welfare Directorate, it is a science and technology-focused university recognized by the University Grants Commission (UGC). The university is situated in Qadirabad Cantonment, Natore District, Rajshahi Division, Bangladesh. As a science and technology-focused university, BAUET serves as a hub for technical excellence in the northern region of Bangladesh, balancing discipline with academic freedom to foster innovation in the private higher education sector.

== Background ==
Bangladesh Army University of Engineering & Technology (BAUET) started its journey on 15 January 2015. BAUET is located at Qadirabad Cantonment in Natore. The place is one of the important communication hubs for adjoining major district headquarters: Rajshahi, Pabna, Bogra & Kushtia. Qadirabad Cantonment which is located at Dayarampur is one of the famous places of Natore. Especially, this place is famous for its educational institutions. It has a quiet and serene environment which offers a very congenial academic atmosphere.

The main campus is located at Qadirabad Cantonment, with a immense infrastructural support from Cantonment. It is a matter of great pride that within a short span of time the University has its own permanent campus in the present location. Moreover, the university has established a wide range of broadband internet facilities with Wi-Fi zone in the campus. The laboratories are well equipped with modern instruments and smart classrooms.

== Faculties and departments ==
There are currently 5 engineering and 3 non-engineering departments running under 4 faculties at BAUET. These departments mostly offer undergraduate programs as of now with a plan of offering more post-graduate and research programs in the near future. There are also plans to establish more engineering and non-engineering departments under new faculties within the shortest possible time. All of the programs of BAUET are approved by the UGC. The structure of the faculties and offered degrees is as follows:

Faculty of Electrical and Computer Engineering

- Department of Computer Science and Engineering (CSE)
  - Bachelor of Science in computer science and engineering (B.Sc. in CSE)
- Department of Electrical and Electronic Engineering (EEE)
  - Bachelor of Science in electrical and electronic engineering (B.Sc. in EEE)
- Department of Information and Communication Engineering (ICE)
  - Bachelor of Science in information and communication engineering (B.Sc. in ICE)
- Department of Electronic and Telecommunication Engineering (ETE) (Proposed)
  - Bachelor of Science in electronic and telecommunication engineering (B.Sc. in ETE)

Faculty of Civil and Environmental Engineering

- Department of Civil Engineering (CE)
  - Bachelor of Science in civil engineering (B.Sc. in CE)
- Department of Architecture (Proposed)
  - Bachelor of Architecture (B.Arch.)

Faculty of Mechanical and Production Engineering

- Department of Mechanical Engineering (ME)
  - Bachelor of Science in mechanical engineering (B.Sc. in ME)
- Department of Apparel Manufacturing Engineering (AME) (Proposed)
  - Bachelor of Science in apparel manufacturing engineering (B.Sc. in AME)

Faculty of Business Studies

- Department of Business Administration
  - Bachelor of Business Administration (B.B.A.)
  - Master of Business Administration (M.B.A.)
  - Executive Master of Business Administration (E.M.B.A.)

Faculty of Science and Humanities

- Department of English
  - Bachelor of Arts in English language and literature (B.A. in ELL)
  - Master of Arts in English language and literature (M.A. in ELL)
- Department of Law and Justice
  - Bachelor of Law (L.L.B.)
- Department of Physics (Proposed)
  - Bachelor of Science in physics (B.Sc. in physics)
- Department of Mathematics (Proposed)
  - Bachelor of Science in mathematics (B.Sc. in mathematics)
- Department of Economics (Proposed)
  - Bachelor of Social Science in economics (B.S.S. in economics)
- Department of Sociology (Proposed)
  - Bachelor of Social Science in sociology (B.S.S. in sociology)

Department Starting Year

Department	Starting Session & Year	Running Batch when Department Start
Civil Engineering	Summer 2015	1st
Computer Science and Engineering	Summer 2015	1st
Electrical and Electronic Engineering	Summer 2015	1st
Information and Communication Engineering	Summer 2016	3rd
Business Administration	Summer 2016	3rd
English Language and Literature	Summer 2016	3rd
LLB	Summer 2016	3rd
Mechanical Engineering	Summer 2021	13th

== Faculty members ==
Adjunct professors from BUET, RUET, University of Dhaka, and University of Rajshahi conduct classes regularly at BAUET.

== Accreditation and ranking ==
BAUET is fully approved by UGC and the government of Bangladesh. It is also on the verge of getting accreditation from the Board of Accreditation for Engineering and Technical Education, Bangladesh, and the prestigious Institution of Engineers, Bangladesh. A popular university ranking website, adscientificindex.com, ranks BAUET in the 22nd position among all Bangladeshi universities for 2023.

== Research ==
A journal, called the BAUET Journal, is published annually in order to preserve the scientific discoveries of the university. Both the students and teachers publish scientific articles regularly in this journal. The university authority provides large amounts of research grants to promising research projects that are conducted at the university. Teachers and students often collaborate on research projects, and most of the research works are published in various international conference proceedings and journals. Many of the research works conducted in BAUET have been indexed in Scopus.
