= University of Bogura =

Public university in Bangladesh

- বগুড়া বিশ্ববিদ্যালয়
- Type: Public university
- Established: 2025; 1 year ago
- Chancellor: President Mirza Fakhrul Islam Alamgir
- Vice-Chancellor: Dr. Md. Kudrat-E-Zahan
- Location: Bogura, Bangladesh
- Campus: Bogura
- Website: www.ub.ac.bd

University of Bogura (Bengali: বগুড়া বিশ্ববিদ্যালয়) is a government-financed public university of Bangladesh.

== History ==
Bogra University of Science and Technology was established in 2001 and continued its academic activities until 2013, and again until the end of 2018. However, due to a lack of funding, the university ceased its operations afterward. In January 2019, the cabinet approved the draft Bogura Science & Technology University Bill, 2019. That draft was not pursued in parliament. Instead, the 2001 act was implemented on 23 May 2023.

== List of vice-chancellors ==
- Md. Kudrat-E-Zahan (4 June 2025 – present)

== Academic Programs ==
On January 20, 2026, the University Grants Commission (UGC) of Bangladesh granted administrative approval to the university to launch two departments under one faculty.

Approved Faculty and Departments
| Faculty | Departments | Approval Date |
|---|---|---|
| Engineering and Technology | Computer Science and Engineering (CSE) | January 20, 2026 |
| Engineering and Technology | Automobile Engineering | January 20, 2026 |
