= Northern University, Bangladesh =

Private university in Bangladesh

Coordinates: 23.8494°N 90.4242°E

Northern University Bangladesh
- Motto: Knowledge for Innovation and Change
- Type: Private university
- Established: 2002
- Chairman: Abu Yousuf Md. Abdullah
- Chancellor: President Mirza Fakhrul Islam Alamgir
- Vice-Chancellor: Md. Mizanur Rahman
- Faculty: 300
- Administrative staff: 350
- Students: 18000 (above)
- Undergraduates: 16210
- Postgraduates: 1790
- Location: 111/2, Kawlar Jame Masjid Road, Ashkona, (Near Hajj Camp) Dakshinkhan, Dhaka, Bangladesh
- Campus: Urban
- Language: English
- Colors: Blue, Green & Maroon
- Website: nub.ac.bd

Northern University Bangladesh (Bengali: নর্দার্ন বিশ্ববিদ্যালয় বাংলাদেশ) or NUB is a private university in Dhaka, Bangladesh. It was established in 2002.

The university was sponsored and funded by the International Business Agriculture & Technology (IBAT) Trust. Presently known as NUB Trust (NUBT), a registered, non-political, non-profit voluntary organization.

== History ==
In 2002, a group of eminent academics established Northern University Bangladesh on 17 October. Sponsored and founded by International Business Agriculture & Technology (IBAT) Trust now known as NUB Trust (NUBT), a registered, non-political, non-profit voluntary organization.

Northern University Bangladesh (NUB) has 5 faculties situated within the Dhaka Metropolitan City with its permanent campus near Haji camp at Ashkona, Dakshin Khan. NUB has been authorized to confer degrees and certificates in all branches of knowledge including Business, Health Science, Humanities & Social Science, Law, Science & Engineering within the levels that include Bachelor, Master & Diploma in the process of acquiring the level MPhil & PhD in collaboration with foreign universities.

== Vice-Chancellors ==
- Prof. Dr. Md. Mizanur Rahman

== Faculties and Departments ==
Northern University Bangladesh (NUB) has been expanding its academic programs at both the Bachelor’s and Master’s levels across various faculties and departments. At present, the university offers the following academic program:

=== Faculty of Business ===
Department of Business Administration

- BBA (Bachelor of Business Administration) - 4 years
- MBA (Master of Business Administration) - 1/2 years
- MSCM (Master of Supply Chain Management) - 1 year +

=== Faculty of Health Science ===
Department of Pharmacy

- BPHRM (Bachelor of Pharmacy) - 4 years
- MPHRM (Master of Pharmacy) - 1 year

Department of Public Health

- MPH (Master of Public Health) - 1/2 years

=== Faculty of Humanities & Social Science ===
Department of Bangla

- Bachelor of Arts in Bangla - 4 years
- Master of Arts in Bangla - 1/2 years

Department of English

- B. A in ELL (English Language and Literature) - 4 years
- M. A in ELL (English Language and Literature) - 1/2 years
- M. A in ELT (English Language Teaching) - 1/2 years

=== Faculty of Law ===
Department of Law

- LLB (Bachelor of Laws) - 4 years
- LLM (Master of Laws) - 1/2 years

=== Faculty of Science and Engineering ===
Department of Civil Engineering

- B.Sc. in CE (Civil Engineering) - 4 years

Department of Computer Science and Engineering

- B.Sc. in CSE (Computer Science and Engineering) - 4 years
- M.Sc. in CSE (Computer Science and Engineering) - 1 year
- B.Sc. in CSE (Computer Science and Engineering) - 3 years (Lateral Entry for Diploma Engineers)

Department of Electrical and Electronic Engineering

- B.Sc. in EEE (Electrical and Electronic Engineering) - 4 years
- B.Sc. in EEE (Electrical and Electronic Engineering) - 3 years (Lateral Entry for Diploma Engineers)

Department of Electronics and Communication Engineering

- B.Sc. in ECE (Electronics and Communication Engineering) - 4 years
- B.Sc. in ECE (Electronics and Communication Engineering) - 3 years (Lateral Entry for Diploma Engineers)

Department of Mechanical Engineering

- B.Sc. in ME (Mechanical Engineering) - 4 years

Department of Textile Engineering

- B.Sc. in TE (Textile Engineering) - 4 years
- B.Sc. in TE (Textile Engineering) - 3 years (Lateral Entry for Diploma Engineers)

== Board of Trustees ==
Board of Trustees
Name	Designation
Abu Yousuf MD. Abdullah	Chairman
M. Shamsul Haque	Senior Vice-Chairman
Ms. Halima Sultana Jinia	Vice Chairman
Mr. Saad-Al-Zabir Abdullah	Member
Labiba Abdullah	Member
Mossammat Habibun Nahar	Member
Ms. Noorjahan Abdullah	Member
Mr. Nazmus Saadat	Member

== See also ==
- List of universities in Bangladesh
