= Rajshahi Science & Technology University =

Private University in Bangladesh

- রাজশাহী বিজ্ঞান ও প্রযুক্তি বিশ্ববিদ্যালয়
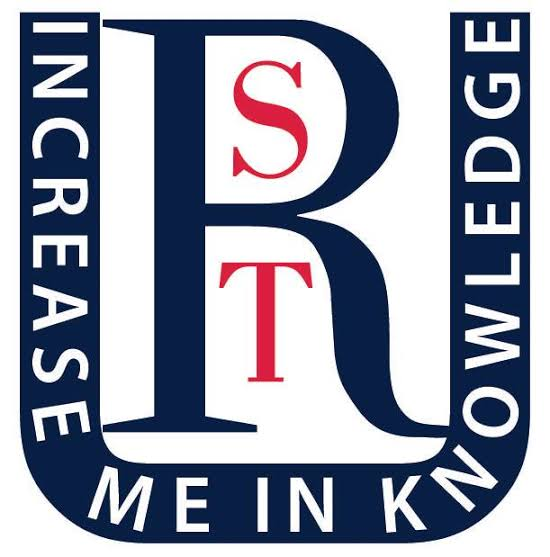
- Motto: আমার জ্ঞান বৃদ্ধি করুন
- Motto in English: Increase my Knowledge
- Type: Private
- Established: 2013
- Affiliations: University Grants Commission (UGC)
- Chancellor: President Mohammed Shahabuddin
- Location: Natore, Rajshahi, Bangladesh; 24.4118°N 89.0028°E
- Campus: Urban
- Website: rstu.edu.bd

Rajshahi Science & Technology University or RSTU (Bengali: রাজশাহী বিজ্ঞান ও প্রযুক্তি বিশ্ববিদ্যালয়) is a private university in Natore, Bangladesh. It was established in 2013.

== Faculties and departments ==
The university has the following faculties and departments:

Faculty of Science and Engineering

- Department of Computer Science and Engineering
  - Bachelor of Science in Computer Science and Engineering (CSE)
  - Bachelor of Science in Computer Science and Engineering (CSE)-For Diploma
- Department of Electrical & Electronics Engineering
  - Bachelor of Science in Electrical & Electronics Engineering (EEE)
  - Bachelor of Science in Electrical & Electronics Engineering (EEE)-For Diploma
- Department of Civil Engineering
  - Bachelor of Science in Civil Engineering (CE)
  - Bachelor of Science in Civil Engineering (CE)-For Diploma
- Department of Textile Engineering
  - Bachelor of Science in Textile Engineering (TE)
  - Bachelor of Science in Textile Engineering (TE)-For Diploma
- Department of Science
  - Bachelor of Pharmacy [B.Pharm(Hons.)]

Faculty of Business

- School of Business
  - Bachelor of Business Administration (BBA)
  - Master of Business Administration (MBA) (Regular)
  - Master of Business Administration (Executive)

Faculty of liberal arts and social sciences

- School of liberal arts and social sciences'
  - Bachelor of Laws (LLB) (2 Yrs.)
  - Bachelor of Laws with Honours (LLB-Hons.)
  - Master of Laws (LLM)
  - Bachelor of Arts in English (Hons.)
  - Master of Arts in English
  - BSS in Economics (Hons.)
  - BSS in media and journalism
  - BSS in Sociology (Hons.)

Newly constructed Academic Building of Rajshahi Science & Technology University at RSTU Permanent Campus: Holding No.: 1123, Tokia, Dastanabad, Natore Sadar, Natore-6260.

== List of vice-chancellors ==
1. Mohammed Shahjahan
2. Abdul Gaffar Miah

== Accreditation ==
The academic programs of the university are recognized by the following organizations:

- UGC University Grants Commission Bangladesh

== Notable alumni and faculty members ==
- Banaj Kumar Majumder, Chief, Police Bureau of Investigation.
