= Pundra University of Science and Technology =

Coordinates: 24.9330°N 89.3473°E

Pundra University of Science & Technology
- Type: Private
- Established: 2001
- Affiliations: University Grants Commission Bangladesh
- Chancellor: President Mohammed Shahabuddin
- Vice-Chancellor: Chitta Ranjan Misra
- Location: Rangpur Road, Gokul, Bogura-5800, Bogura, Bangladesh
- Campus: Rural
- Website: pundrauniversity.ac.bd

Pundra University of Science & Technology (PUB, Bengali: পুণ্ড্র ইউনিভার্সিটি অব সায়েন্স অ্যান্ড টেকনোলজি) is a private university in Bogra, Bangladesh. The university was established in 2001 and obtained approval from UGC and the government of Bangladesh in 2002.

== List of vice-chancellors ==
- Chitta Ranjan Misra (present)
- Md. Mozaffar Hossain

== Accreditation ==
The academic programs of the university are recognized by the following organizations:

- University Grants Commission (Bangladesh) UGC (University Grants Commission, Bangladesh)
