= Abdul Hannan Chowdhury =

Bangladeshi academic

- আবদুল হান্নান চৌধুরী
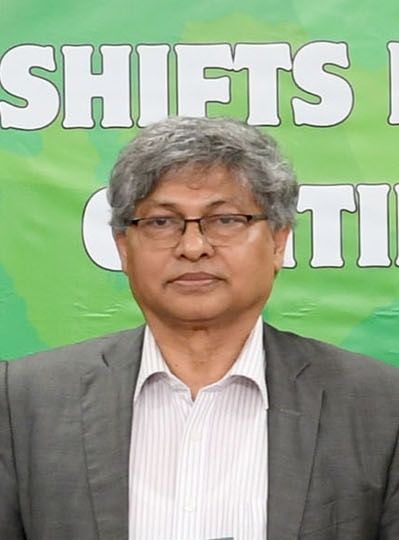
- Chowdhury in 2025

Vice Chancellor of North South University
- Incumbent
- Assumed office 12 September 2024
- Preceded by: Atique Islam

Chairman of Grameen Bank
- Incumbent
- Assumed office 3 September 2024
- Preceded by: AKM Saiful Majid

Vice Chancellor of Primeasia University
- In office 2016–2020
- Succeeded by: Mesbah Kamal

Personal details
- Education: Northeastern University

Abdul Hannan Chowdhury is a Bangladeshi academic, economist, and statistician. In 2024, he became the vice-chancellor of North South University and the chairman of Grameen Bank. Previously, Chowdhury was dean of the School of Business and Economics, North South University. He has also been the vice-chancellor of Primeasia University and pro-vice-chancellor of Eastern University.

== Education ==
Chowdhury completed his bachelor's and master's in statistics from Jahangirnagar University in 1986 and 1987, respectively. After earning another master's degree in industrial engineering in 1996 from Northeastern University in Boston, he earned his Ph.D. from the same university in 1999. Later, he completed a post-doctoral fellowship at the University of Calgary.

== Career ==
After completing his master's at Jahangirnagar University, Chowdhury started his career as a lecturer of management studies at Islamic University, Bangladesh. Later, he went to the United States to pursue higher education. After completing his MS and PhD from Northeastern University in the United States, he worked as a part-time faculty member at the same university from 1999 to 2001. Subsequently, he completed a postdoctoral fellowship and taught at the University of Calgary in Canada from 2001 to 2002. He was a faculty member at Windsor University in Canada from 2002 to 2005.

In 2005, he returned to Bangladesh and became a professor in the School of Business and Economics at North South University. He also served as the director of the BBA program and syndicate member of the university. He then became dean of the School of Business and Economics at the university. Chowdhury also served as the vice chancellor of Primeasia University from 2017 to 2020.

He became chairman and director of the Grameen Bank in 2024.

Chowdhury was also a visiting professor at the Yunnan Normal University in Yunnan, China.

In September 2024, Chowdhury was appointed vice-chancellor of North South University.
