= Institute of Business Administration, University of Dhaka =

Business school under University of Dhaka, Bangladesh

Institute of Business Administration
- ব্যবসা প্রশাসন ইনস্টিটিউট
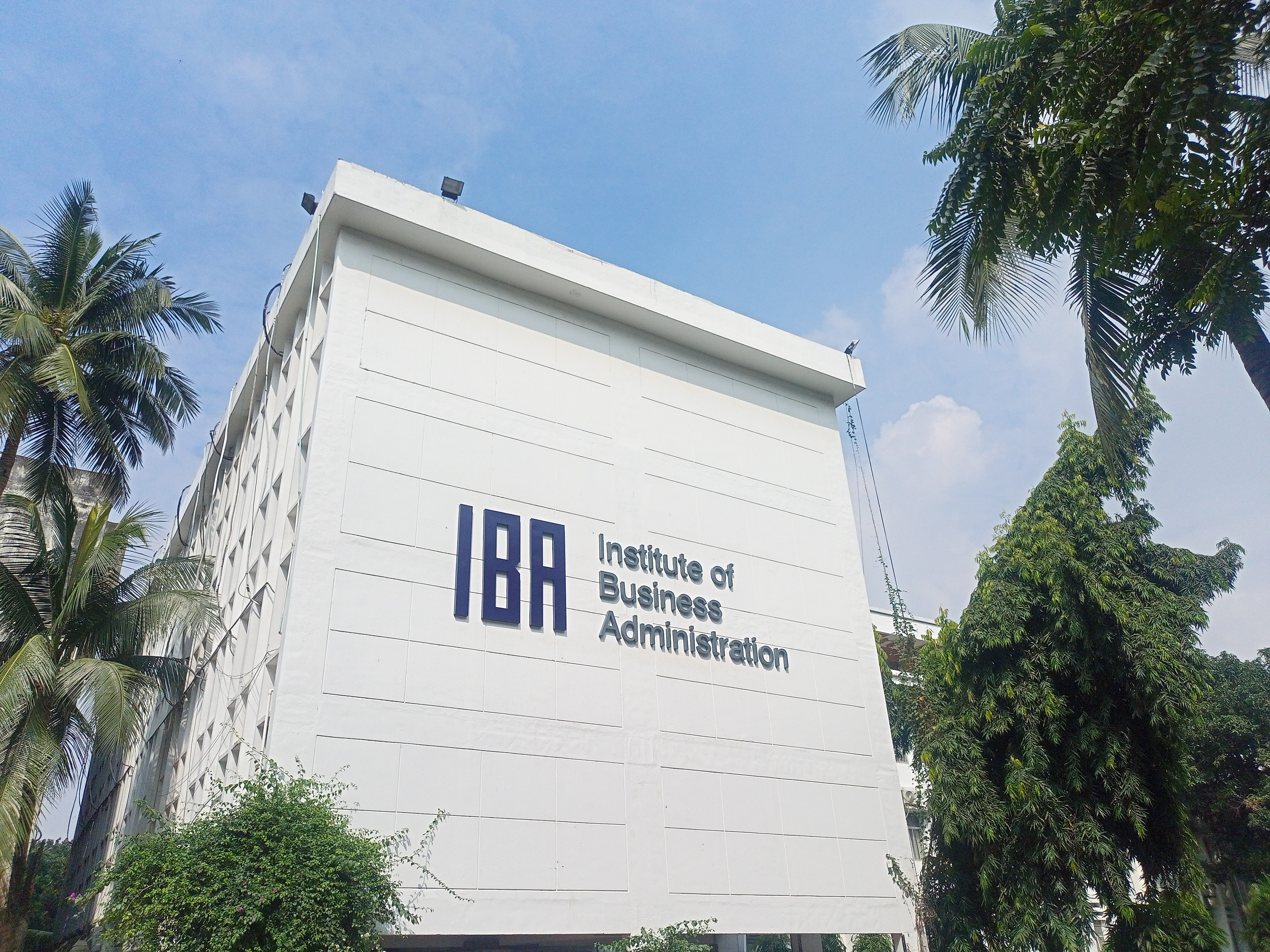
- IBA Building, Dhaka
- Type: Business school
- Established: 1966
- Director: Abu Yousuf Md. Abdullah
- Faculty: 40
- Undergraduates: 480
- Postgraduates: 200
- Location: Shahbag, Dhaka, Bangladesh; 23.7350°N 90.3936°E
- Campus: Urban
- Website: www.iba-du.edu

The Institute of Business Administration (IBA) is the business school of the University of Dhaka, located in Dhaka, Bangladesh. It is widely hailed as the most prestigious business school in the country.

== History ==
IBA was founded in 1966 in collaboration with Indiana University, Bloomington, under a Ford Foundation Financial Assistance Program with the objective of providing professional training to create future business leaders. The Government of Pakistan with the support of Ford Foundation invited Professor Robock of School of Business at Indiana University (USA) to survey the need for management education and advise on the possibility of setting up an institute of business administration in Dhaka like the one in West Pakistan at that time. The founder-director of IBA is M. Safiullah. IBA began by launching its flagship MBA program. In the 1970s, the MPhil and PhD programs were introduced. The BBA program was started in 1993 at the institute. In 2007, the Executive MBA program was launched to cater to the growing demand for quality education among mid-career executives.

== Academics ==
=== Academic programs ===
- BBA Program
- MBA Program
- PhD Program
- MPhil Program
- Executive MBA
- Doctor of Business Administration (DBA)

=== Management Development Programs (MDP) ===
The Management Development Program of the institute is geared towards helping individual managers and organizations augment their management development efforts. The services provided by the program include management training, seminars, workshops, and executive forums.

The following courses are regularly been offered by MDP:

- ACBA: Advanced Certificate in Business Administration (A six-month Joint Program by IBA, DU & AMDISA, a SAARC-recognized body)
- AFNA: Accounting For Non-Accountants
- ACMP: Advanced Certificate for Management Professionals
- CBSI: Competitive Business Strategy & Innovation
- FNM: Finance For Non-Finance Managers
- HRMC: Human Resource Management Competencies
- LCMC: Leadership Certificate in Managerial Communication
- MCFM: Marketing Competencies For Managers
- MSSP: Marketing Skills For Service Professionals
- RMC: Relationship Marketing Competencies

The MDP also provides some two-day (weekend) short courses on the following topics:

- Credit Risk Management (CRM)
- Integrated Marketing Communication (IMC)
- Leadership & Change Management
- Sales & Salesmanship Excellence
- Supply Chain Management

Post Graduate Diploma in Garment Business (PGD-GB)

Institute of Business Administration (IBA), University of Dhaka with support from the Ministry of Finance, Government of Bangladesh, is offering a Post Graduate Diploma in Garment Business (PGD-GB). There are three modules in the program. Each module is three (3) months long. The first module gives the knowledge of basic management subjects focusing on the functional areas of business. The second module is industry attachment. In the third module, industry, and trade-related subjects are taught by industry experts.

== IBA Mubarak Ali Case Centre ==
In 2024, IBA Mubarak Ali Case Centre (IBA MACC) has been launched at Dhaka University to create and highlight Bangladeshi business case studies for students locally and globally. It is a joint initiative of the Mubarak Ali Foundation and the Institute of Business Administration (IBA), the centre embodies a commitment to developing future business leaders equipped to navigate and shape the global business environment. The Mubarak Ali Foundation (MAF) embodies the enduring legacy of Olympic Industries founder Mubarak Ali.

== Campus ==
IBA has its own premises within the campus of the University of Dhaka. The four-storied main building contains 65,000 square feet (6,000 m^{2}) of floor space. To cater to the unique needs of business and society, the institute has created some special centers such as the Center for Management Research and Publications(CMRP), IBA Computer Center (IBACC), Development and Policy Research Center(DPRC), Center for Women's Studies (CWS), Center for Entrepreneurship and Small Business Development (CESBD), IBA Case Development Center (ICDC), Center for Population Management and Research (CPMR), and IBA Environment Development Center (IEDC). Each Center is headed by a chairperson chosen from the IBA faculty members.

== Notable faculty ==
- Muzaffar Ahmed, economist and Ekushey Padak laureate academician
- Imran Rahman, academician and musician
- Salimullah Khan, intellectual and academician
- Md. Tafazzul Islam, former chief justice of Bangladesh
- Hafiz Siddiqi, former vice-chancellor of North South University

== Notable alumni ==
- Ahsan Adelur Rahman, politician
- Muhammed Aziz Khan, founder and chairman of the Summit Group
- Tahsan Rahman Khan, actor, singer, songwriter and former lecturer of BRAC University
- Shahriar Alam, politician, former state minister of the Ministry of Foreign Affairs (Bangladesh).
- Syed Alamgir, businessman
- Nazmul Hasan Papon, former member of parliament and former president of Bangladesh Cricket Board
- Mahmudur Rahman, one of the owners and acting editor of Bengali daily newspaper Amar Desh
- Mohammed Shamsul Hoque Bhuyan, businessman and member of parliament
- Ayman Sadiq, founder of 10 Minute School
- Ashik Chowdhury, Executive Chairman of Bangladesh Investment Development Authority & Bangladesh Economic Zones Authority
- Rafsan Sabab, Bangladeshi television host.

== Graduation ceremony speaker ==
- 2023: Iqbal Quadir, senior fellow of Harvard Kennedy School
- 2022: Abdur Rouf Talukder, governor of Bangladesh Bank
- 53rd Ceremony, 2020: Sheikh Fazle Fahim, president of FBCCI
- 52nd Ceremony, 2019: Rubana Huq
