= Mohammadpur Thana =

Thana in Dhaka North City Corporation

Mohammadpur Thana মোহাম্মদপুর থানা
- Thana
- Interactive map of Mohammadpur Thana
- Location of Mohammadpur Thana within Dhaka Location of Mohammadpur Thana within Dhaka Division Location of Mohammadpur Thana within Bangladesh
- Coordinates: 23.76639°N 90.35863°E
- Country: Bangladesh
- Division: Dhaka Division
- District: Dhaka District
- Established as a thana: 1976

Area
  - Total: 8.23 km^{2} (3.18 sq mi)
- Elevation: 23 m (75 ft)

Population (2022)
  - Total: 527,771
  - Density: 47,828/km^{2} (123,870/sq mi)
- Time zone: UTC+6 (BST)
- Postal code: 1207
- Area code: 02

Mohammadpur (Bengali: মোহাম্মদপুর) is a thana of Dhaka, Bangladesh. Initially Mohammadpur had grown as a residential area, subsequent commercial places have also been developed as well.

== History ==
Unlike some parts of Dhaka city, most parts of Mohammadpur were planned in the 1950s as relatively broad streets and avenues. Saat Masjid, a prominent archaeological structure in the area is part of a renowned mosque of Dhaka city called Shia Masjid.

== Geography ==
Mohammadpur thana has an area of 8.23 km^{2}. It is connected to Sadar Ghat and Gabtali by the city protection dam. Mohammadpur borders Shyamoli and Adabor Thana to the north, Sher-E-Bangla Nagar to the east and Dhanmondi and Hazaribagh thanas to the south.

== Demographics ==
Religions in Mohammadpur Thana (2022)
Religion	Percent
Islam	95.74%
Hinduism	3.76%
Other or not stated	0.50%

According to the 2022 Bangladeshi census, Mohammadpur Thana had 142,864 households and a population of 527,789. 7.33% of the population were under 5 years of age. Mohammadpur had a literacy rate (age 7 and over) of 84.25%: 85.48% for males and 82.70% for females, and a sex ratio of 122.59 males for every 100 females.

According to 2011 Census of Bangladesh, Mohammadpur Thana has a population of 355,843 with average household size of 4.4 members, and an average literacy rate of 73.5% vs national average of 51.8% literacy.

== Points of interest ==
=== Residential blocks ===
Japan Garden City, a big gated community is a part of the neighbourhood. Other well-known blocks include the Pisciculture Housing Society, Mohammadia Housing Society, Baitul Aman Housing Society, Chad Miah Housing, Probal Housing, Tajmahal road and a number of residential areas, which have all grown substantially. This has resulted in a real estate construction boom accompanied by markets and shopping complexes.

Kaderabad Housing is a large housing complex near Mohammadpur Bus Stand. The housing is well organized and has a college and school inside. A large apartment block developed by Assurance and Sara Builders sits near the complex. It is near the main bus stand of the Mohammadpur and the Martyred Intellectuals Memorial.

Residential neighbourhoods like Lalmatia and Bosilla, which has recently undergone rapid modernisation and urbanisation is also a part of the Mohammadpur Thana.

Mohammadpur, initially planned as a residential area, has experienced a significant shift towards commercial development since the 2000s. This transformation has led to the establishment of numerous chain stores, local shops, and a growing number of small to mid-sized shopping malls.

=== Geneva camp ===
The Geneva Camp for "Biharis" (mostly from the Indian state of Bihar and other parts of India who migrated to the then East Pakistan during the Partition of 1947) is in Mohammadpur. Biharis have been living there since the end of the 1971 War of Liberation.

=== Asad Gate ===
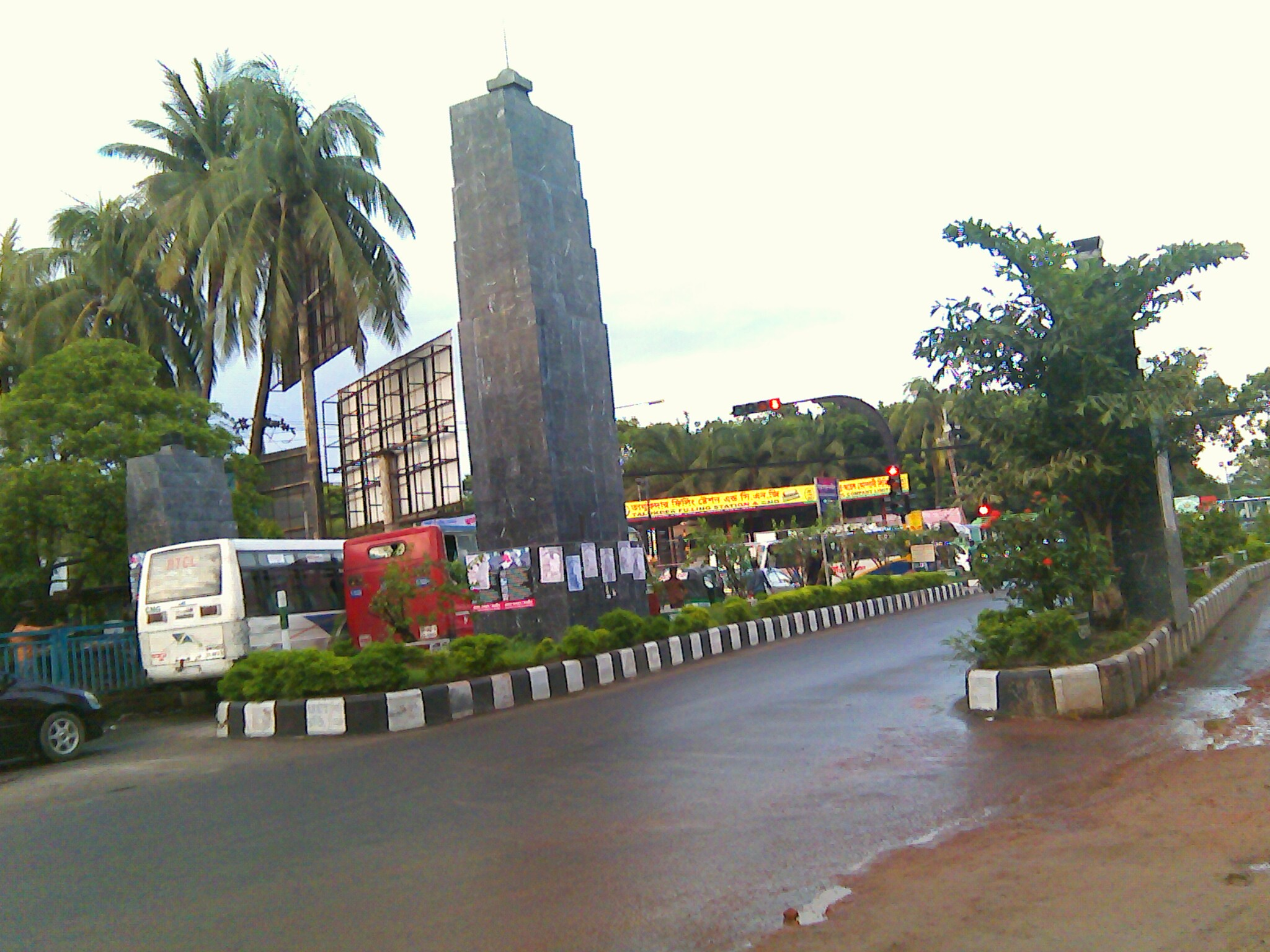
Asad Gate

Asad Gate is the monument of the country's liberation war. It was named after an unarmed young man named Asad was killed by the Pakistani army during protests against the erstwhile military junta of Pakistan, part of Bangladesh's independence movement.

== Transportation ==
BRTC, Raja City, Midline, Torongo, Torongo Plus, Malancha, Projapoti, Poristhan, Rojonighondha, Swadhin, Meshkat, 13 No, Dhaka Nagar Poribahan. and some other bus transportation companies have facilitated the communication system of the inhabitants of this area.

== Education ==
=== Schools and colleges or madrasha ===
- Child Heaven International School
- Ha-Mim Model School
- London Grace International School
- Gawsia Islamia Fazil Degree Madrasah
- Quaderiya Tayebiya Aliya Kamil Madrasah
- Academia
- Mohammadpur Government College
- Summerfield International School
- Govt. Graphic Arts Institute
- Mangrove School
- Mohammadpur Government High School
- Mohammadpur Girls' High School
- Mohammadpur Preparatory Higher Secondary School
- Dhaka Udyan Government College
- St Joseph Higher Secondary School
- St Francis Xavier's Green Herald International School
- Dhaka Residential Model College
- Northern International School
- Mohammadpur Central University College
- Mohammadpur Mohila College
- Dhaka State College
- Alhaj Mokbul Hossain Bisshobiddalay College
- Mohammadpur Model School & College
- Bengali Medium High School
- Dr. M Mizanur Rahman Professional College
- St Paul's Mission School Bangla Medium
- Dr. M Mizanur Rahman Collegiate School
- Firoza Bashar Ideal College
- St Paul's Missionary School English Medium
- South Breeze School

=== Universities ===
- University of Liberal Arts Bangladesh
- Bangladesh University
- People's University of Bangladesh

=== Madrasa ===
- Jamia Rahmania Arabia

== Culture ==
- Studio 6/6

== See also ==
- Upazilas of Bangladesh
- Districts of Bangladesh
- Divisions of Bangladesh
