= Quazi Azhar Ali =

Bangladeshi educator

- কাজী আজহার আলী
- Born: 10 March 1934; Bagerhat, Bengal Presidency, British India
- Died: 15 December 2009 (aged 75)
- Education: University of Dhaka; Harvard University
- Spouses: Sakina Azhar
- Parents: Ashraf Uddin (father); Khodeza Khatun (mother)

Quazi Azhar Ali (10 March 1934 – 15 December 2009) was a Bangladeshi educationist and academic administrator. He established Bangladesh University in Dhaka in 2001 and served as the founding vice-chancellor.

== Background and education ==
Ali was born on 10 March 1934 to Ashraf Uddin and Khodeza Khatun in Bagerhat. He passed matriculation and intermediate from Mulghat High School and P.C. College, Bagerhat. He then earned his bachelor's and master's degrees from the University of Dhaka. He got a diploma in public administration from Cambridge University. He earned another master's Degree from Harvard University.

== Career ==
Ali taught at Michael Madhusudan College in Jessore, Murari Chand College in Sylhet and at the University of Dhaka.

Ali joined the then Pakistan Civil Service (CSP) in 1959. He served as sub-divisional officer (SDO) in Rajbari, additional deputy commissioner (ADC), deputy commissioner (DC) Rangpur and Comilla districts and secretary in ministries including Home and Education. He also served as director general of Bangladesh Academy for Rural Development (BARD) in Comilla. After the independence of Bangladesh in 1971, he served as a secretary of six different ministries at the government of Bangladesh.

Ali became the first secretary of Bangladesh Agricultural Development Corporation (BADC). He was chairman Bangladesh Power Development Board, Tea Board, T.C.B, and FDC. He also served as alternate executive director of Asian Development Bank.

Ali became a fellow at Bangla Academy in 2006.

=== Philanthropy ===
Ali established several educational institutions with his personal funds and raising subscription from the generous public which include Bangladesh University, Mohammadpur Preparatory School & College, Sakina Azhar Technical College, Ashraf Uddin School and Khodeza Khatun Girls High School, Fakirhat College at Fakirhat, Bagerhat, Rajbari College and Rajbari Girls High School and Khulna Public School and College.

Ali was one of the founding members of Bangladesh Medical College and National Heart Foundation.
