= North South University =

Private university in Dhaka, Bangladesh

- নর্থ সাউথ বিশ্ববিদ্যালয়
- Crest of North South University
- Motto: Seek Knowledge
- Type: Private
- Established: 1992; 34 years ago
- Accreditation: IEB; ACBSP
- Affiliations: University Grants Commission (UGC)
- Chancellor: President Mirza Fakhrul Islam Alamgir
- Vice-Chancellor: Abdul Hannan Chowdhury
- Academic staff: 1291 (2017)
- Administrative staff: 544 (2017)
- Students: 26,000 (2020)
- Undergraduates: 17,517 (2017)
- Postgraduates: 2,508 (2017)
- Location: Bashundhara, Dhaka, 1229, Bangladesh; 23.8152°N 90.4257°E
- Campus: 5.5 acres (2.2 ha); Urban
- Language: English
- Website: northsouth.edu

University rankings

Global – Overall
- QS World: 901-950 (2027)
- THE World: 801-1000 (2026)

Global – Business and economics
- QS Business: 351-400 (2021)
- QS Economics: 451-500 (2024)
- THE Business and Economics: 501-600 (2026)

Global – Liberal arts
- THE Social Sciences: 501-600 (2026)

Global – Life sciences and medicine
- THE Clinical and Health: 401-500 (2026)

Global – Science and engineering
- QS Engineering & Tech.: 551 (2020)
- THE Computer Science: 801-1000 (2026)
- THE Engineering: 601-800 (2026)

Regional – Overall
- QS Asia: =149 (2026)

North South University (Bengali: নর্থ সাউথ বিশ্ববিদ্যালয়, also known as NSU) is a private research university in Dhaka, Bangladesh. It was established in 1992.

The university is ranked among the top universities in Bangladesh. Its business school is the first Bangladeshi university to receive American accreditation from the ACBSP in 2015.

== History ==
The university was established under the Private University Act, 1992, by the then Foundation for Promotion of Education and Research (FPER), a charitable, non-profit, non-commercial, and non-political organization. The foundation of the campus was laid on 30 January 2003 by Begum Khaleda Zia, then prime minister of Bangladesh. Classes started on the current campus on 9 June 2009. The FPER later was renamed as the NSU Foundation and is presently called The North South Foundation for Education and Research.

== Campus ==
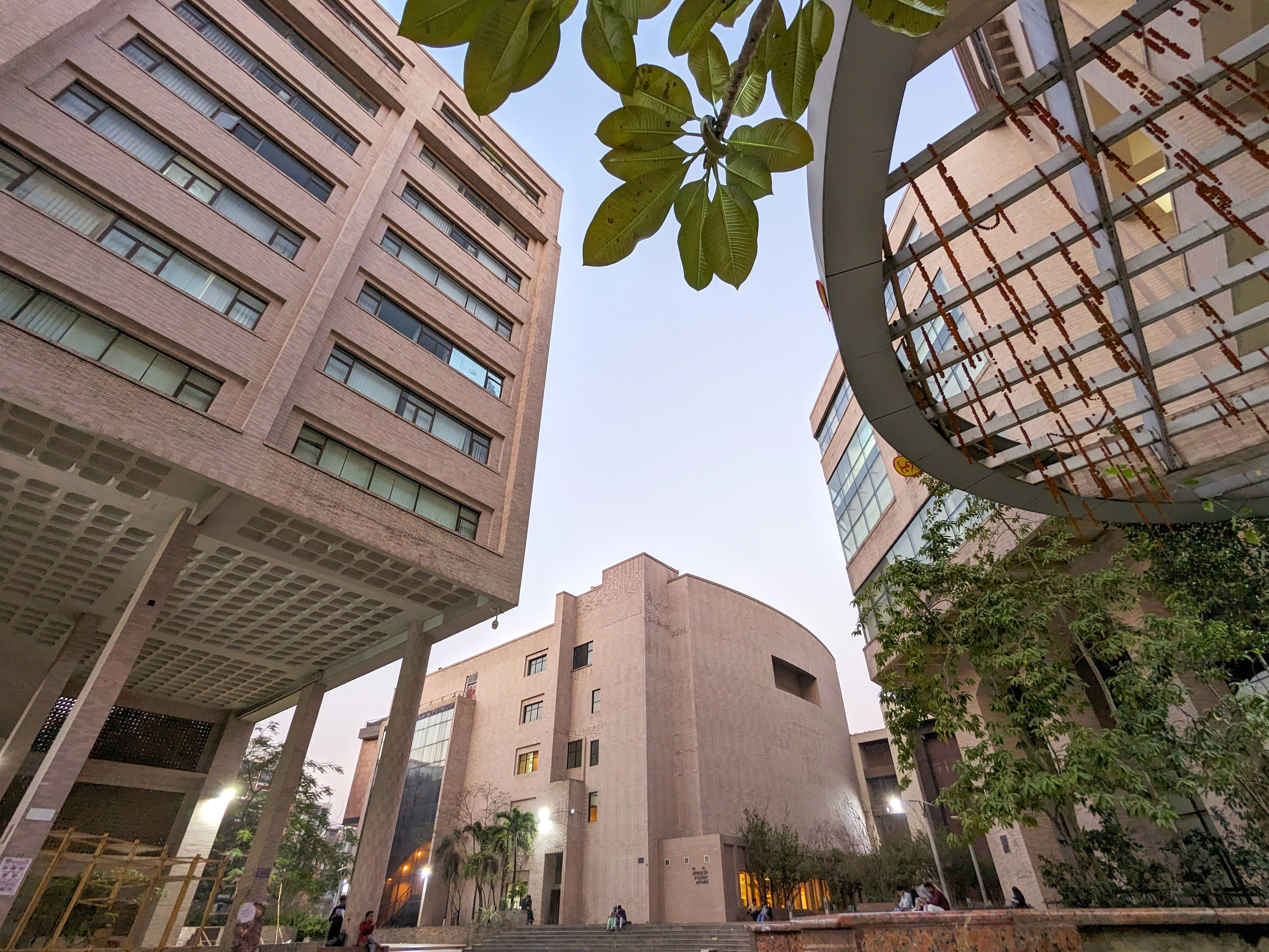
North South University campus

The university's campus is located in the Bashundhara Residential Area in Dhaka. It is one of the largest private universities in Bangladesh in terms of student population.

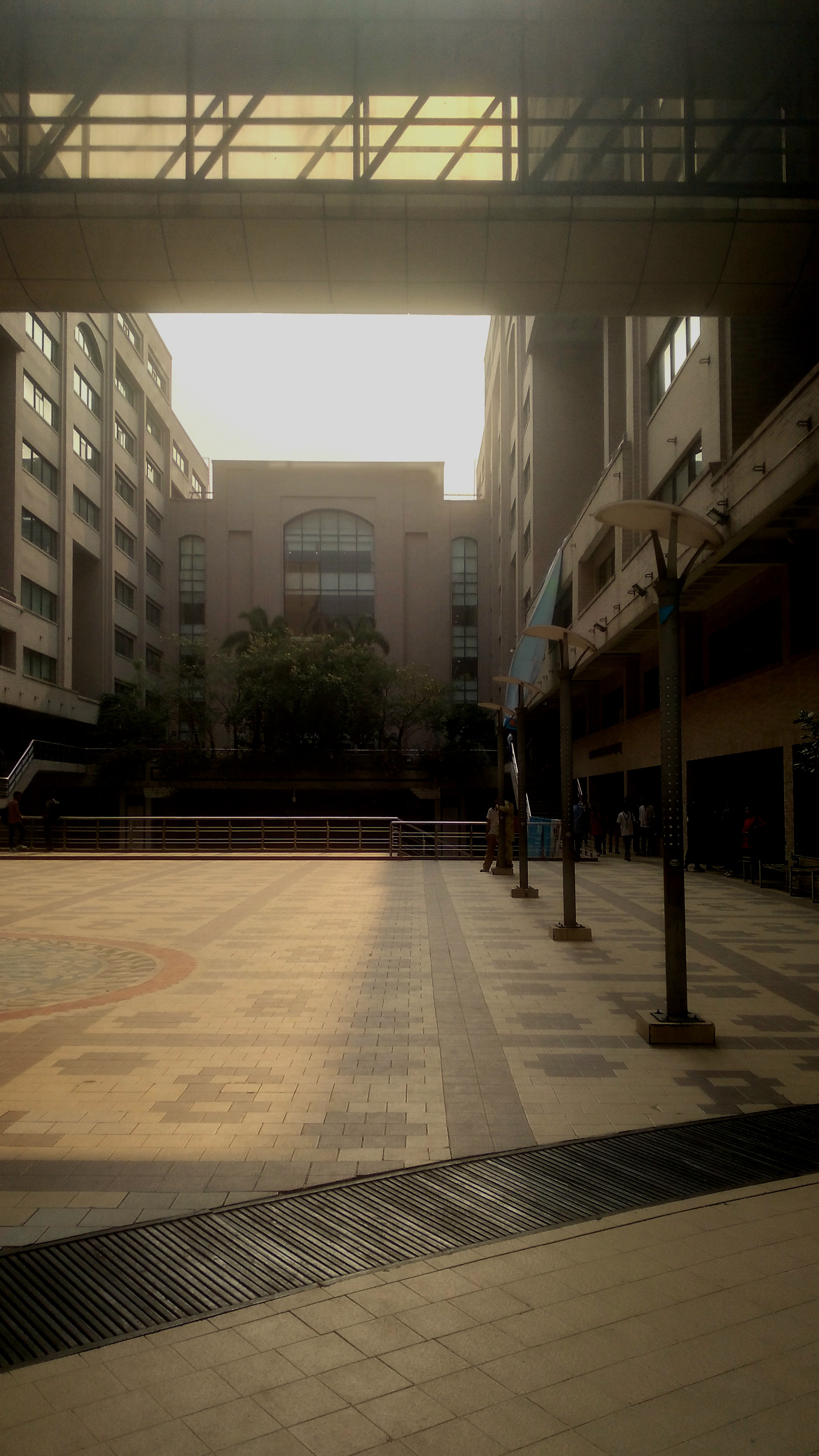
North South University's upper plaza

The campus can serve up to 12,000 students with amenities and facilities. It contains six buildings with three basements on seven acres of land with 1,250,000 square feet of floor space.

=== Library ===
The NSU library has over 70,000 square feet (6,500 m^{2}) of floor area on the southeastern side of the campus. It is the first fully automated university library in Bangladesh using its own library management software, which supports an RFID system, a web-based online circulation system, full-text e-books, and online journal article repository services. The library can accommodate over 1,200 students at a time in its reading rooms. On average, 2,000 students use the library every day.

As of August 2014, the library holds 49,500 books, 50,000 online books, 6,000 bound journals (foreign and local), magazines, 1,890 CD-ROM databases, 226 DVDs and videos, 159 audio cassettes, and other resources.

== Administration ==
There is a separate admin building dedicated to administrative activities.

=== List of vice-chancellors ===
- Muslehuddin Ahmad
- Hafiz Siddiqi (3 January 2003–2010)
- Amin U. Sarkar (June 2013—August 2015)
- Atique Islam (2016 — August 2024)
- Abdul Hannan Chowdhury (12 September 2024 — present)

== Academic departments ==
The university's departments are organized into four schools.

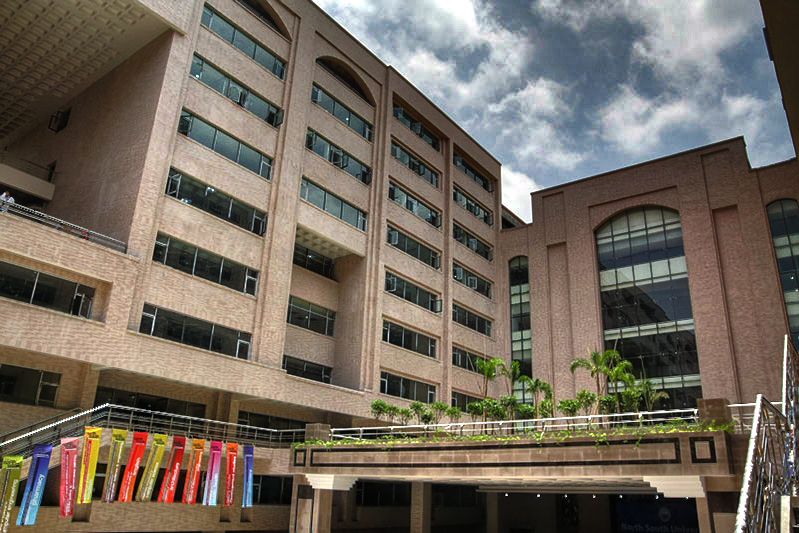
SAC and Admin Building

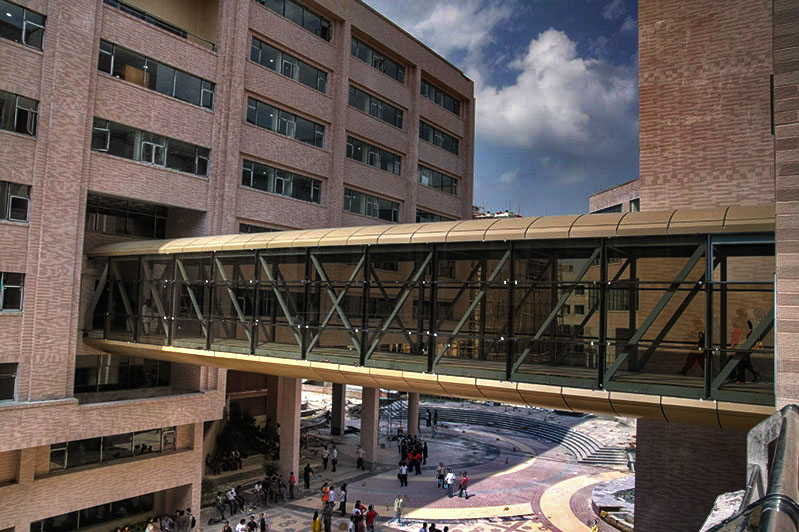
Bridge between SAC and NAC

=== School of Business and Economics (SBE) ===
The School of Business and Economics (SBE) at North South University is accredited by the Accreditation Council for Business Schools and Programs (ACBSP). AKM Waresul Karim is the currently serving dean of the school. It is the first business school in Bangladesh to receive American accreditation. SBE of NSU secured the Global Rank of 401–450 in Business and Management Studies in the QS World University Rankings 2020. The School of Business and Economics (SBE) consists of four departments.

- Department of Accounting & Finance
- Department of Economics
- Department of Management
- Department of Marketing & International Business

=== School of Engineering & Physical Sciences (SEPS) ===
The School of Engineering & Physical Sciences (SEPS) intends to be a center of excellence in innovation and technological entrepreneurship by building a knowledge- and skill-based learning environment for students in the fields of engineering, architecture, and physical sciences with adequate technical competency, social responsibility, communication skills, and ethical standards. Shazzad Hosain is currently serving as the dean of the school. The Department of Electrical and Computer Engineering has three majors in undergraduate programs.

- Department of Architecture
  - Bachelor of Architecture
- Department of Civil and Environmental Engineering
  - Master of Science in Civil Engineering (M.S. in CE)
  - Bachelor of Science in Civil & Environmental Engineering (CEE)
- Department of Electrical and Computer Engineering
  - Masters of Science in Computer Science and Engineering
  - Masters of Science in Electrical and Electronic Engineering
  - Masters of Science in Electronic and Telecommunication Engineering
  - Bachelor of Science in Computer Science and Engineering (BSCSE)
  - Bachelor of Science in Electrical and Electronic Engineering (BSEEE)
  - Bachelor of Science in Electronics and Telecommunication Engineering (BSETE) (Not Continued)
- Department of Mathematics and Physics
  - Master of Science in Applied Mathematics and Computational Sciences (AMCS)
  - Minor in Mathematics
  - Minor in Physics

=== School of Humanities & Social Sciences (SHSS) ===
Md. Rizwanul Islam is currently serving as the dean of the school.

- Department of English & Modern Languages
- Department of Law
- Department of History & Philosophy
- Department of Political Science & Sociology

=== School of Health & Life Sciences (SHLS) ===
Dipak Kumar Mitra is the current dean of the school.

- Department of Biochemistry & Microbiology
- Department of Environmental Science and Management
- Department of Pharmaceutical Sciences
- Department of Public Health

== Institutes ==
NSU has several institutes and centers.

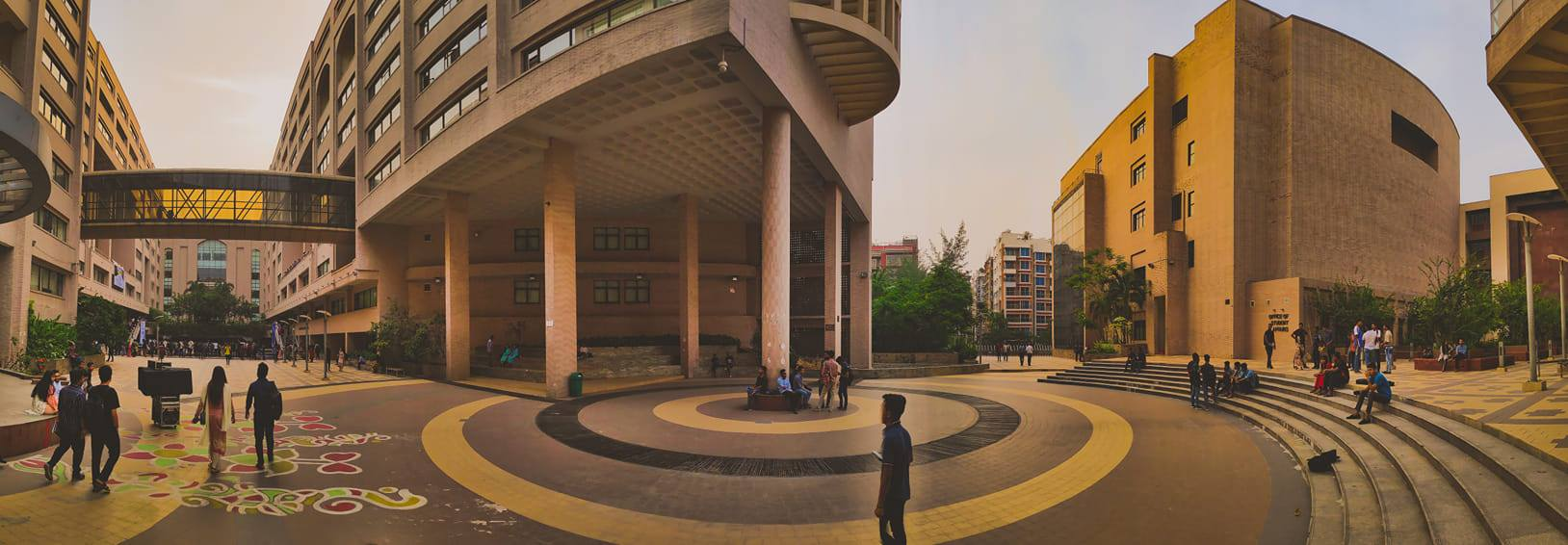
In front of Central Library

=== Institute of Development, Environment and Strategic Studies (IDESS) ===
The Institute of Development, Environment and Strategic Studies (IDESS) is a research center.

=== NSU Global Health Institute (NGHI) ===
The NSU Global Health Institute (NGHI) at NSU was established NGHI for the discovery and competency development of human welfare, aiming to build and strengthen the emerging field of global health response and leadership.

=== NSU Genome Research Institute (NGRI) ===
The NSU Genome Research Institute (NGRI) at NSU was established on 14 May 2017, for the discovery and competency development of human welfare, aiming to build and strengthen the emerging field of genomic research field leadership, which is the first genomic research institute in Bangladesh.

=== Confucius Institute ===
The Confucius Institute at NSU was established in February 2006, the only language institute in Bangladesh that offers Chinese-language only education.

=== Student Counselling Center (SCC) ===
The North South University-Student Counseling Center (NSU-SCC) is a support system for the students of the university and addresses their emotional well-being. It serves as a primary mental health care unit, and as such it offers taking therapy and advice for further referrals. It has no jurisdiction over the academic and administrative affairs of the university.

=== Career and Placement Center (CPC) ===
The Career and Placement Center (CPC) is a comprehensive career management support platform for NSU students.

=== Center for Infrastructure Research and Services (CIRS) ===
Center for Infrastructure Research and Services (CIRS, NSU) can offer access to the university's state-of-the-art laboratory equipment and facilities to companies of all sizes for a wide range of testing and analysis services. The services that it offers reflect the breadth and depth of the university's research capabilities, from independent testing services to collaborative prototype generation. The center has expert technicians, servicemen, and staff under the direct supervision of faculty members to carry out the tests and analyses. CIRS undertakes research, testing, and consultation work in the fields of engineering, construction management, and environmental issues as required by private, government, or autonomous bodies.

=== NSU Center for Business Research (NSU CBR) ===
There was a strong need at the NSU business research community for a platform focusing on building, storing, investigating, analyzing, and learning through research activities on business and economic phenomena in Bangladesh and the world. Based on these overarching needs, a new Center for Business Research was established.

=== Economics Research Platform (NSU ERP) ===
This platform was established with the intention of facilitating economic research and policy analysis. It currently holds seminars, workshops, and conferences.

== Publications ==
The university publishes a journal called Panini.

== Rankings ==
In the latest World University Rankings 2023 published by Times Higher Education, NSU ranked joint top among all universities in Bangladesh. In the 2024 QS World University Rankings, NSU achieved a ranking of 851-900 globally. In the same year, they ranked 191st among all Asian universities. Furthermore, they ranked 351-400 and 451–500 in the QS subject rankings for "Business and Management Studies" and "Economics and Econometrics" respectively. In addition to which, they also ranked in the 651-700 band for "Computer and Information Systems".

Moreover, they ranked 301–500 in the "Graduate Employability Ranking 2020" published by the higher education information service provider Quacquarelli Symonds (QS), which indicates how well students from a university can gain a foothold in the global job market.

== Gallery ==
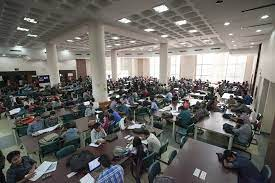

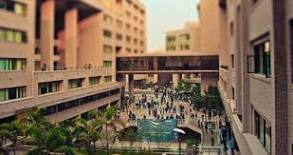

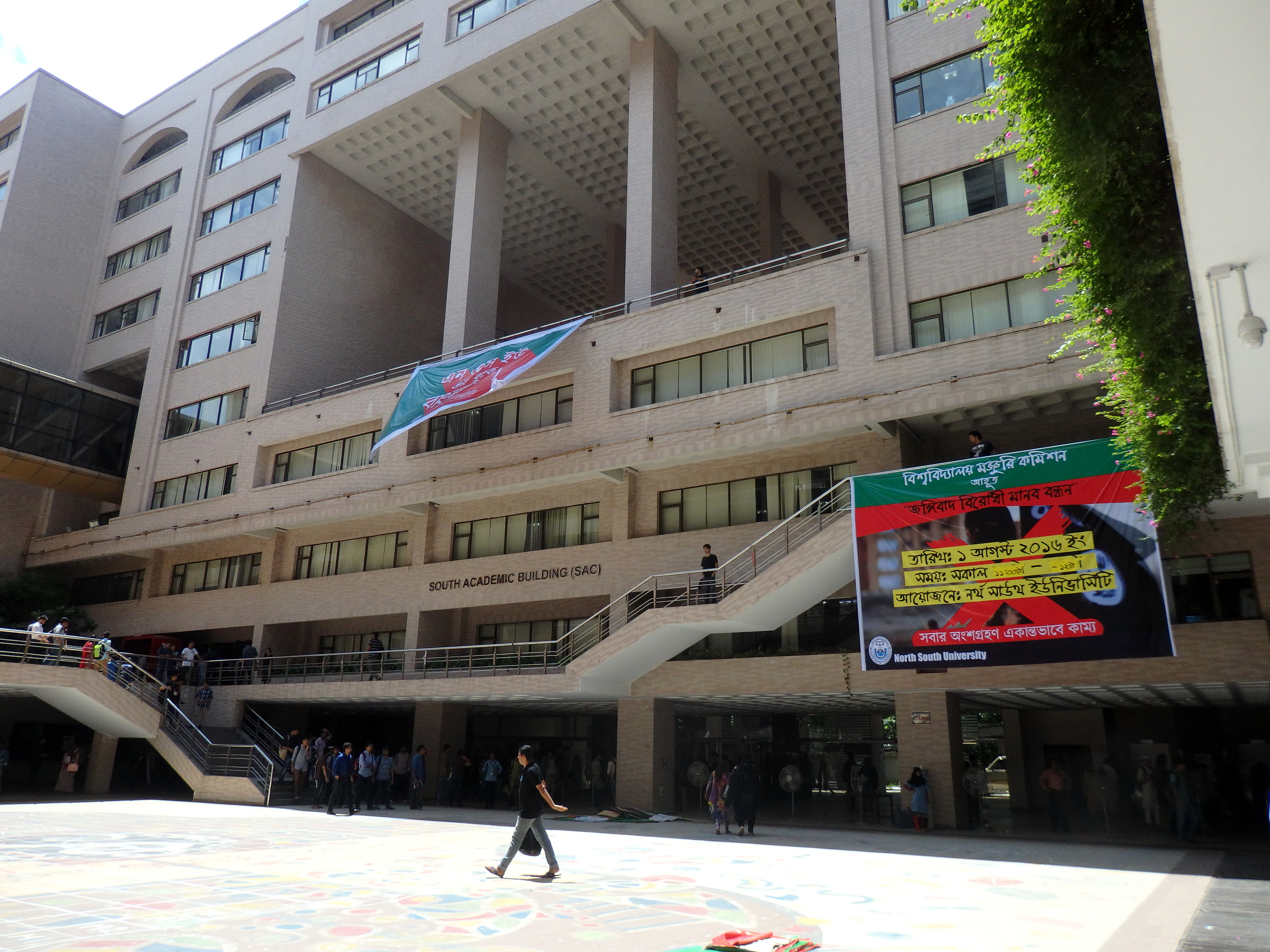

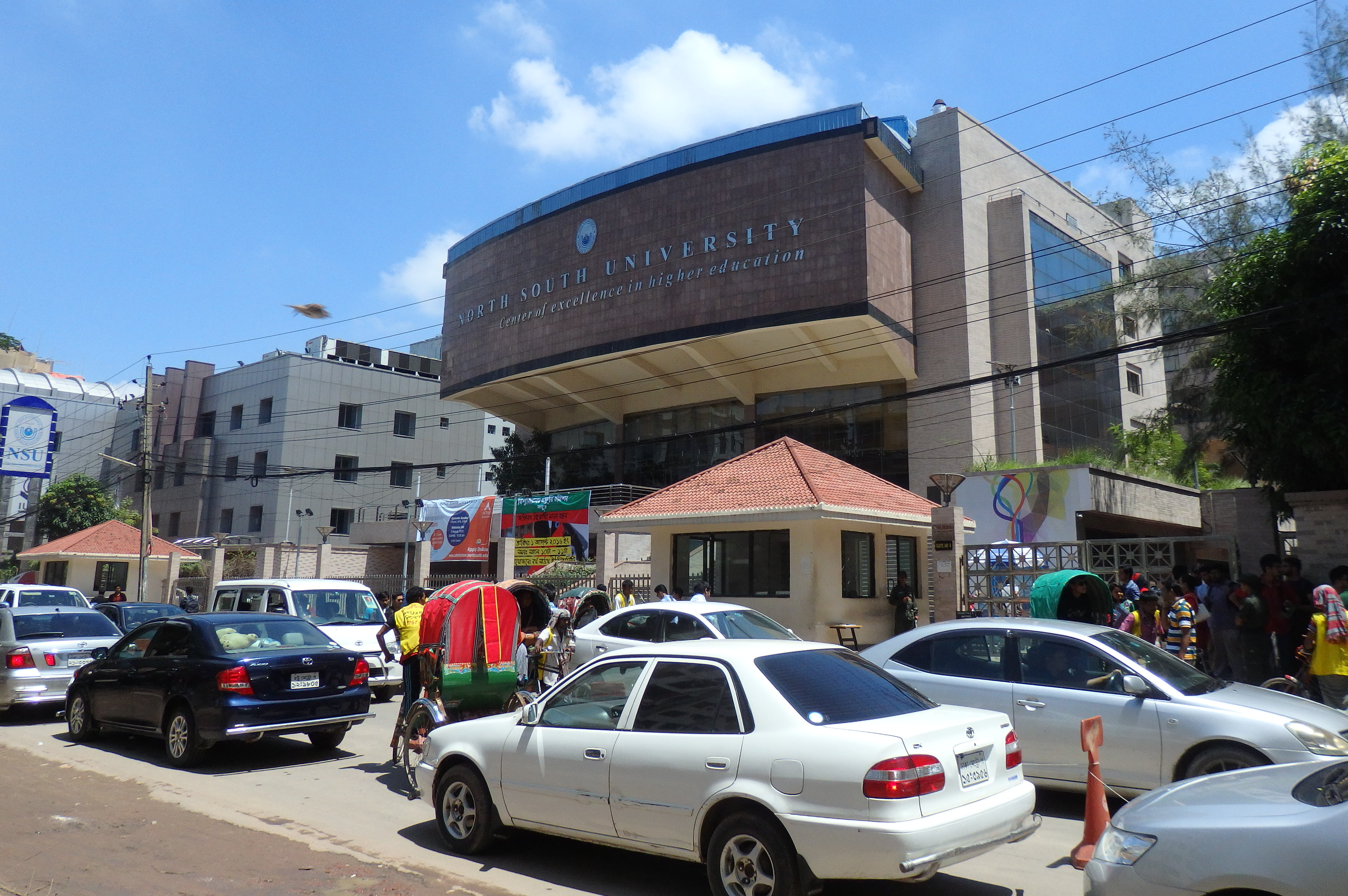

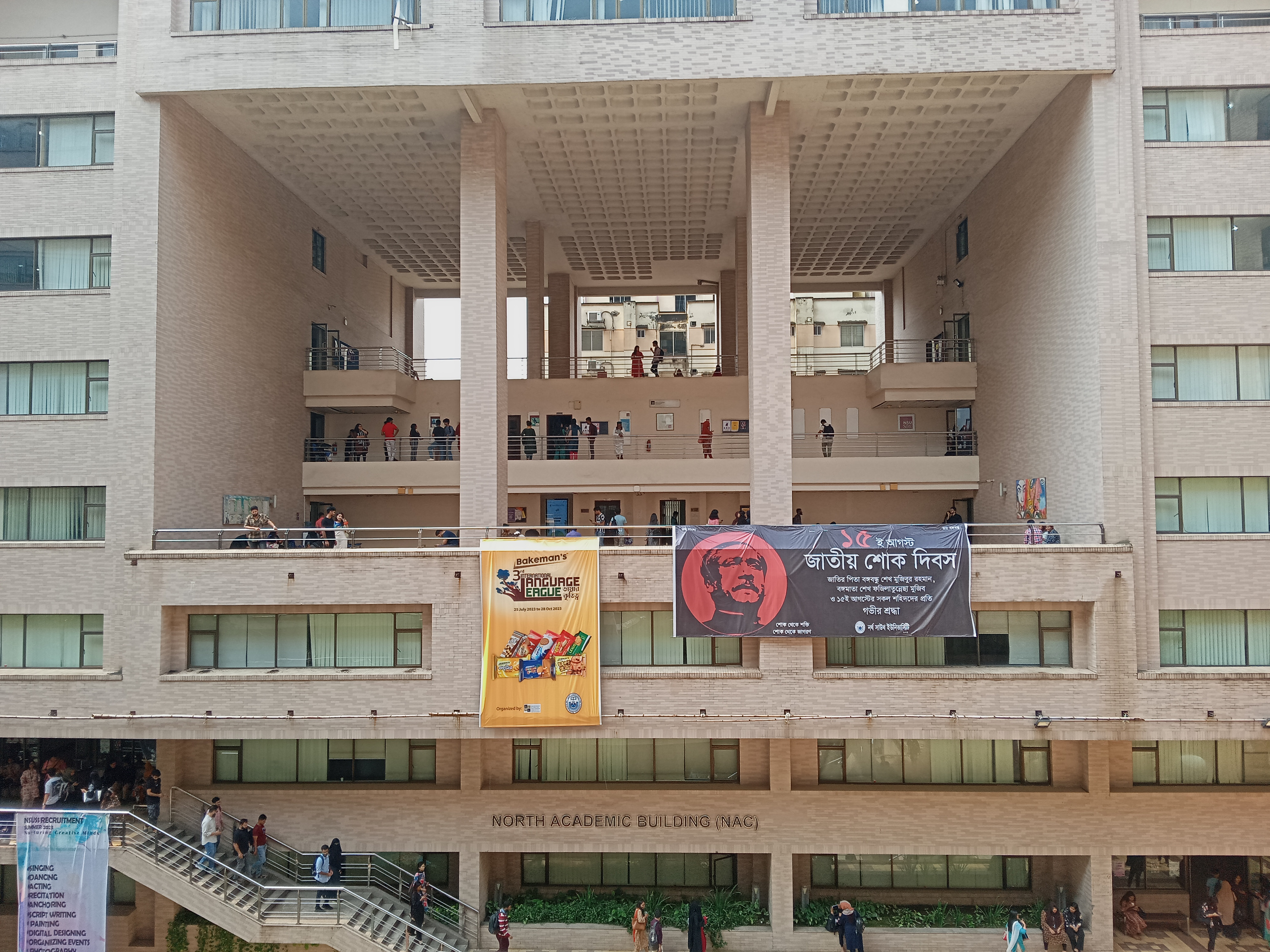

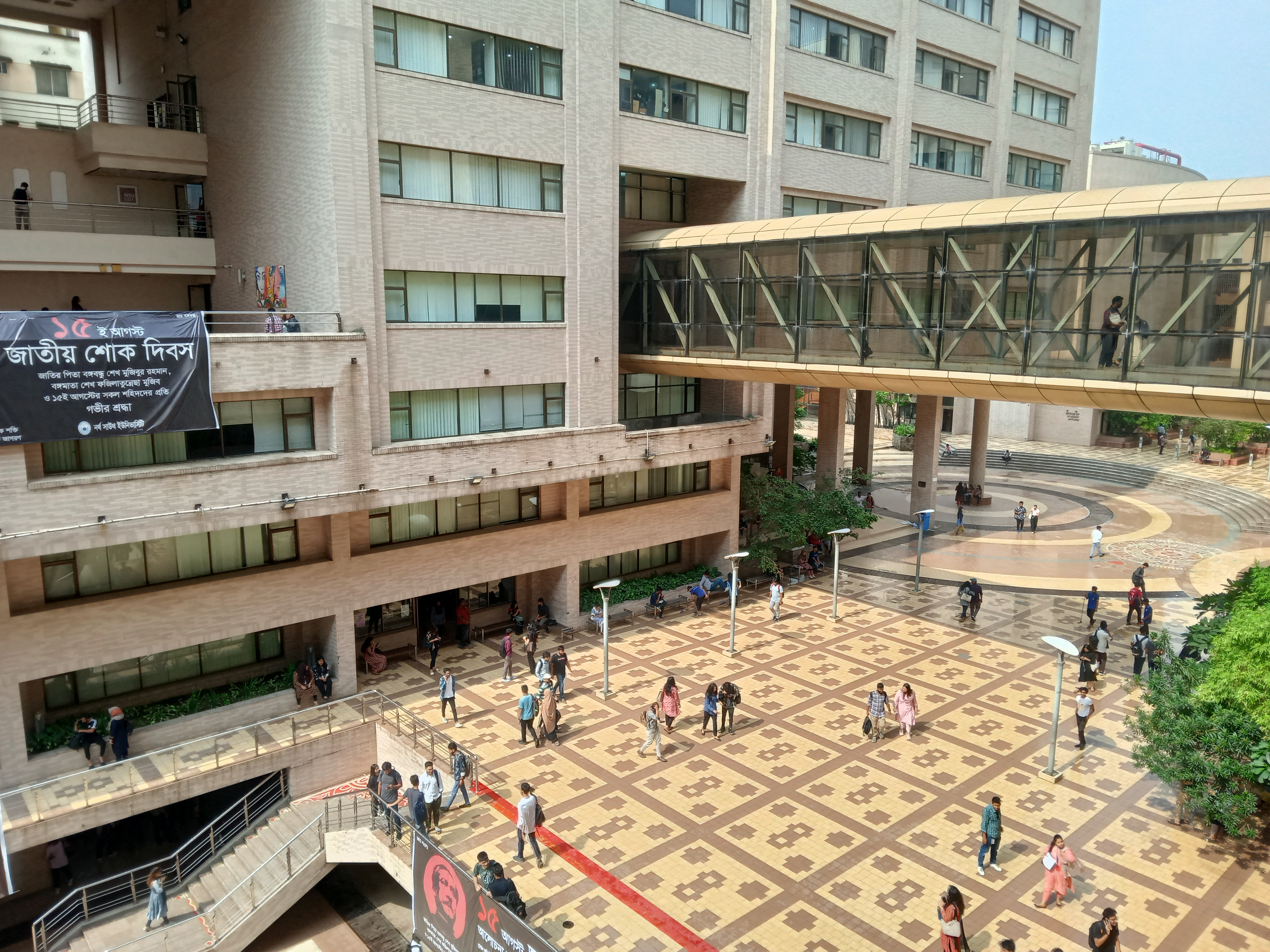

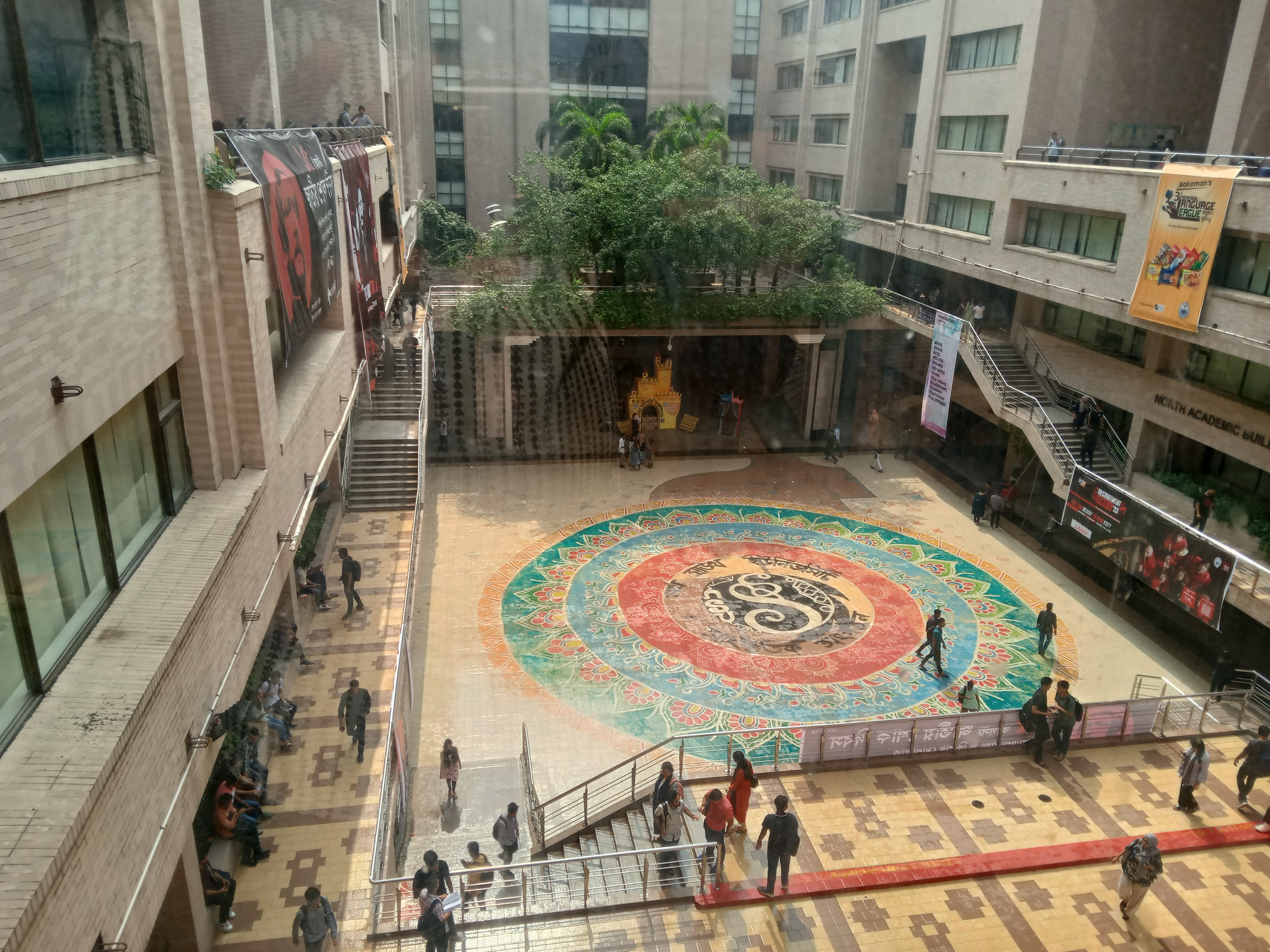

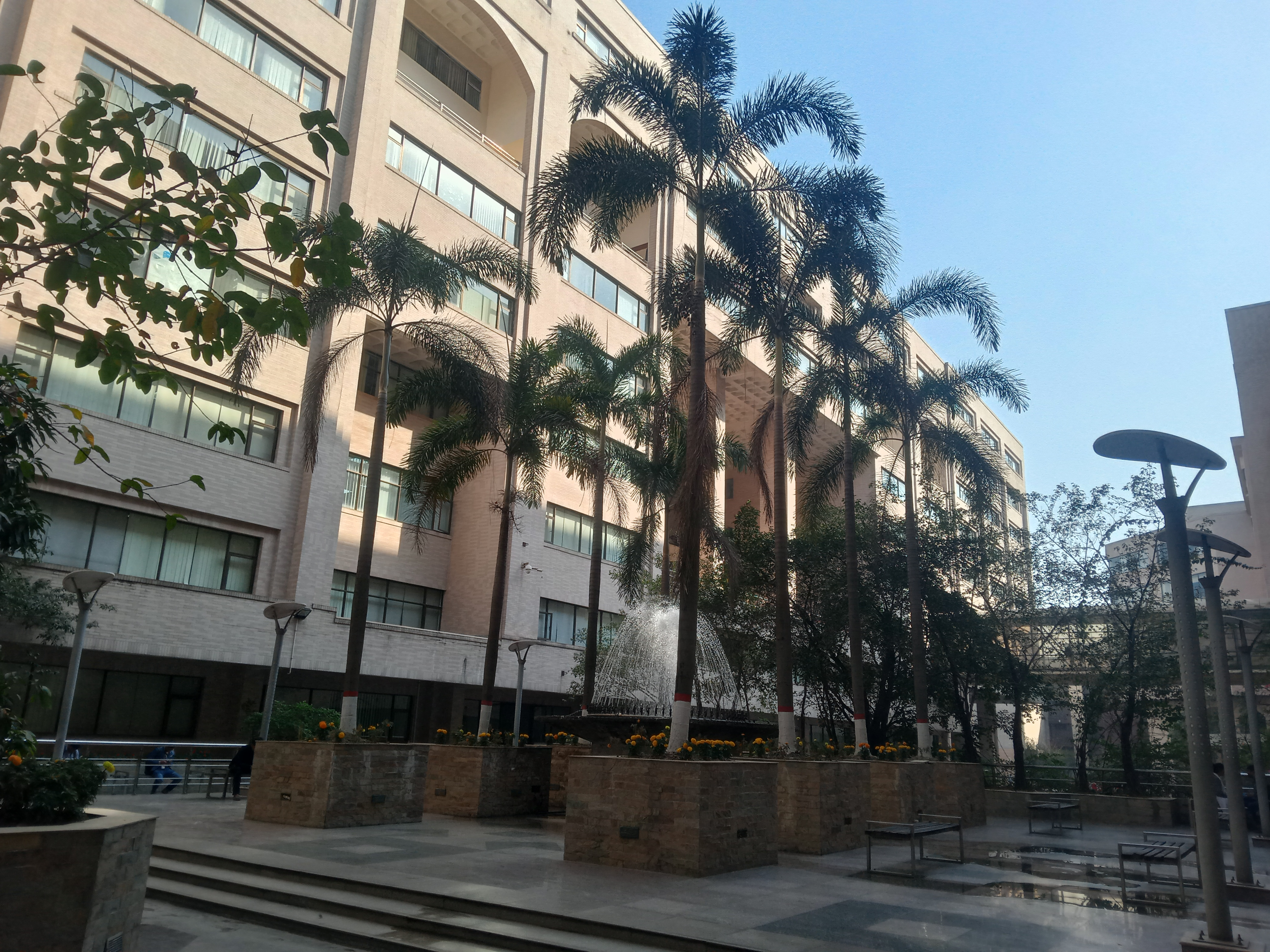

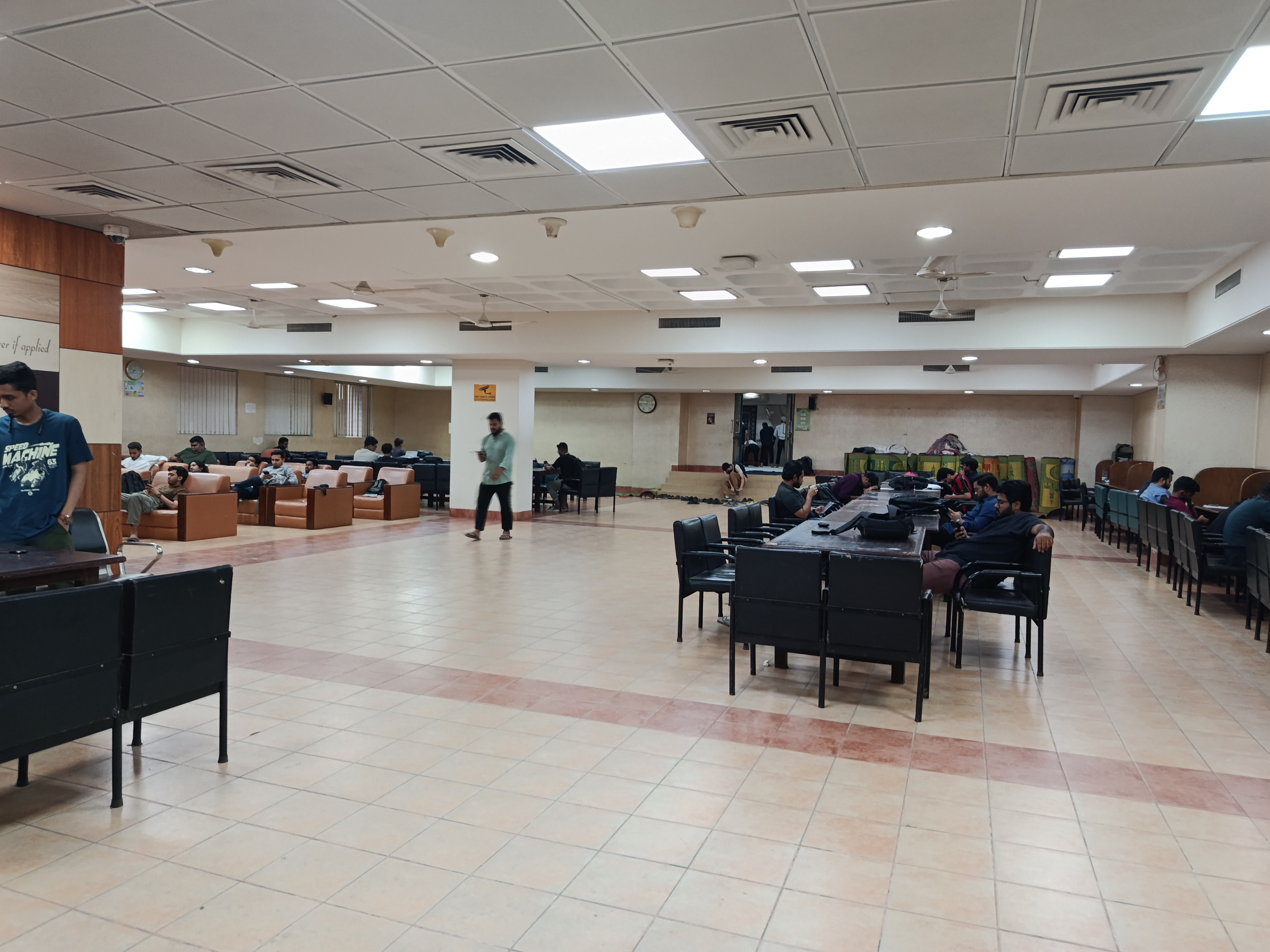

== Notable people ==
=== Faculty ===
- Syed Alamgir, businessman
- Abdul Hannan Chowdhury, professor and vice-chancellor of North South University and chairman of Grameen Bank
- Justice Abdul Wahhab Miah, former judge of the Supreme Court of Bangladesh and former acting Chief Justice of Bangladesh
- Syeda Rizwana Hasan, adviser to the Interim Government of Bangladesh
- Mohammad Kamrul Ahsan, academic and vice-chancellor of the Jahangirnagar University
- Salehuddin Ahmed, professor, economist and finance advisor to the interim government of Bangladesh
- Cynthia McKinney, former US congresswoman and presidential candidate
- Bobby Hajjaj, politician, MP and state minister

=== Alumni ===
- Aninda Islam Amit, politician, MP and state minister
- Mohammad Ponir Hossain, photographer and journalist
- Shoumya Joyti, actor
- Elita Karim, vocalist and journalist
- Tasneem Khalil, journalist
- Shamim Kaisar Lincoln, politician, MP and state minister
- Zara Jabeen Mahbub, businesswoman and politician
- Aydha Mehnaz, fashion and media manager
- Tanvir Mishuk, entrepreneur and co-founder of Nagad.
- Mostafa Monwar, actor
- Sabila Nur, actress
- Mashiat Rahman, actress
- Samia Said, actress and model
- Kusum Sikder, actress and director
- Nusrat Imrose Tisha, actress and producer
- Topu, musician and singer-songwriter
- Tanjim Saiyara Totini, actress

== Controversies ==
- The University Grants Commission investigated NSU in 2012, 2016, and 2019. Each probe found rampant corruption and administrative irregularities. Because the UGC found that some members of the board of trustees were "involved in anti-state activities, sponsorship of militancy, corruption and arbitrariness", President Abdul Hamid reconstituted the board in August 2022, dismissing seven members and adding three new ones.
- Former students involved in militancy: In 2016, some former students of NSU and faculty members were found to have links with militant activities. Some of them were involved in violent armed assaults. Later, investigators found printed materials published by militant groups in a library. UGC suggested measures to curb the involvement by student attendance tracking, online monitoring by guardians and student participation in social activities.
- In 2021 some of the trustees allegedly used the university and misused power, they allegedly raised their sitting allowance to up to 10 times the approved rate and got themselves luxury cars at the expense of the students.
- On 20 August 2024, The Supreme Court of Bangladesh ruled that its trustee board was illegal and formed a new board of trustees.

== See also ==
- List of universities in Bangladesh
- Universities in Bangladesh
