= Mesbah Kamal =

Bangladeshi academic

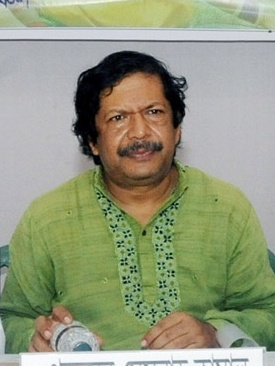
- Kamal in 2015

Vice Chancellor of Royal University of Dhaka
- Incumbent
- Assumed office 30 December 2023

Vice Chancellor of Bangladesh University
- In office 20 July 2022 – 30 December 2023

Vice Chancellor of Primeasia University
- In office 21 May 2021 – 20 July 2022

Personal details
- Education: University of Dhaka

Mesbah Kamal is a Bangladeshi academic. He is the vice chancellor of Royal University of Dhaka (RUD). He was the vice chancellor of the Bangladesh University (BU). And he was also vice chancellor of Primeasia University. He is a professor in the department of history at Dhaka University.

Kamal is the chairman of the Research and Development Collective and the general secretary of the Bangladesh Adivasi Odhikar Andolon. He is the Chief Advisor of Bangladesh Dalit Forum.

== Early life ==
Kamal was born 21 July 1958 in Chapai Nawabganj District, East Bengali, Pakistan. He father was Manzoor Ahmed.

Kamal completed his bachelor's and master's in history at the University of Dhaka in 1980 and 1981 respectively. He finished his PhD from the University of Dhaka in 2015 and his thesis was on Manabendra Narayan Larma and the Chittagong Hill Tracts conflict.

== Career ==
Kamal joined the University of Rajshahi in 1983 and the University of Dhaka as a lecturer in 1984. He joined BBC Bengali Service in 1987.

Kamal has been critical of the politics of Bangladesh Nationalist Party and Khaleda Zia describing it as destructive nationalism. He claimed the Bangladesh Nationalist Party lost the general election in 2018 stance for Pakistan and against the Bangladesh Liberation War.

Kamal was appointed vice chancellor of Primeasia University on 21 May 2021.

Kamal was appointed vice chancellor of Royal University of Dhaka on 22 July 2022.

Lawyer Gazi M H Tamim filed a genocide complaint against Kamal, former prime minister Sheikh Hasina, 29 journalists, and 22 others including Muhammad Zafar Iqbal. In May 2025, an attempted murder case was filed against Rashid over a student of Alia Madrasa getting injured in Old Dhaka during protests against former Prime Minister Sheikh Hasina in August 2024.
