= Tanvir Mishuk =

Bangladeshi entrepreneur

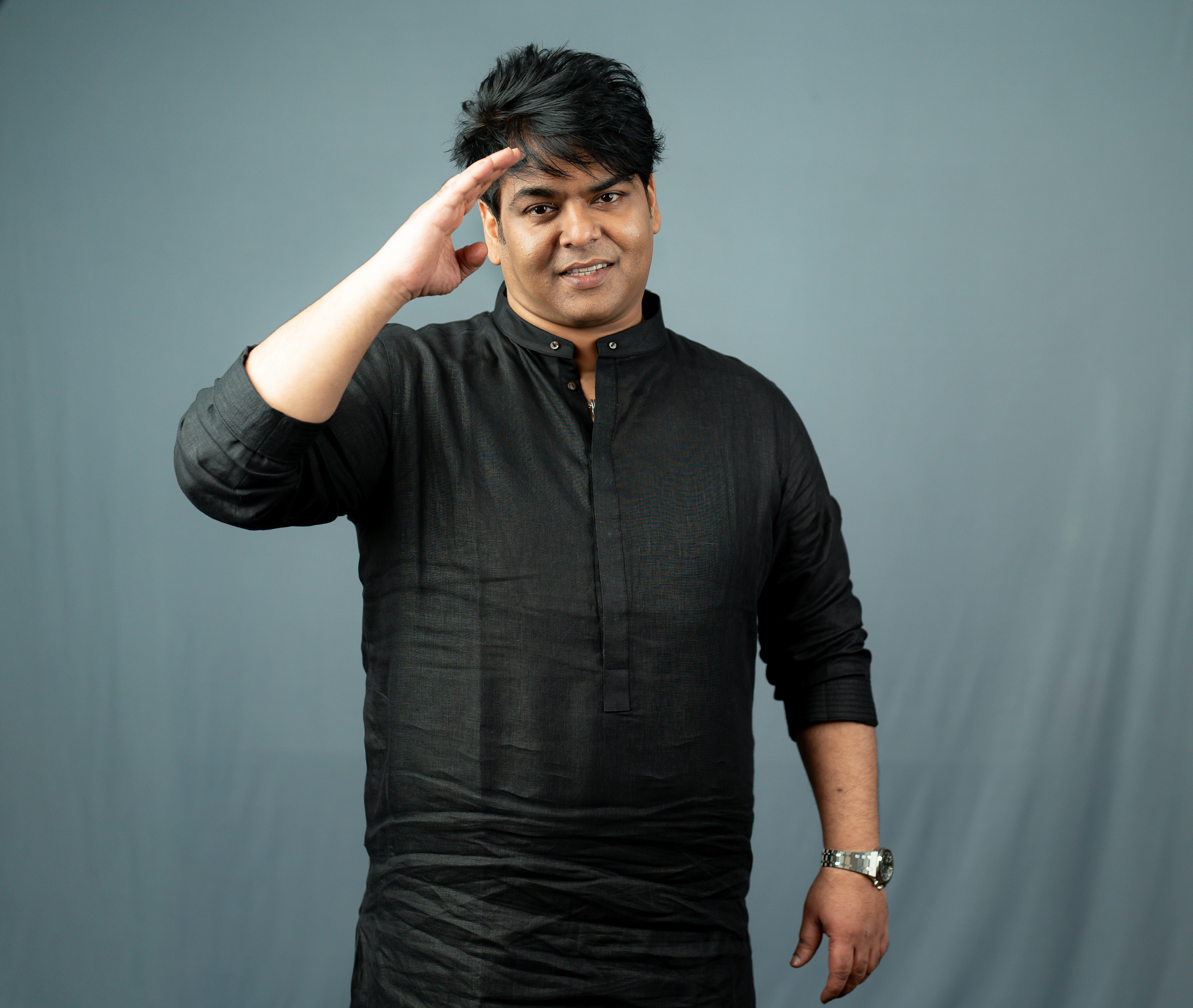
- Tanvir Mishuk in an event
- Born: Bangladesh
- Education: North South University (BBA)
- Occupation: Entrepreneur
- Known for: Founder of Nagad, RegTech Bangladesh

Tanvir Mishuk is a Bangladeshi entrepreneur known for his involvement in the digital financial services and regulatory technology sectors. He is the founder and former Managing Director of Nagad, a mobile financial service provider launched in partnership with the Bangladesh Post Office, and the founder and CEO of RegTech Bangladesh, a company focused on compliance automation and financial technology solutions.

== Early life and education ==
Mishuk graduated with a degree in Business Administration from North South University in Dhaka, Bangladesh. He began his career in telecommunications, founding Telekom Asia in Singapore in 2009. The company grew to become a notable mobile operator in the region. He later served as Managing Director of Sigma Telecom, which, during his tenure, became one of the leading international gateway (IGW) operators in Bangladesh.

== Career ==
In 2019, Mishuk played a key role in the launch of Nagad, a mobile financial service (MFS) that aimed to increase financial inclusion in Bangladesh. Operated as a public-private partnership with the Bangladesh Post Office, Nagad introduced several innovations, including a digital know your customer (e-KYC) onboarding process using national identification, USSD-based access for feature phone users, and a system enabling transfers to non-registered recipients. The platform was also used for distributing government disbursements such as social welfare benefits and COVID-19 relief payments through a secure biometric system.

Following his work at Nagad, Mishuk established RegTech Bangladesh, a company that provides technology solutions for regulatory compliance, including real-time KYC/AML screening, identity verification, and digital onboarding. In 2025, the company expanded internationally by securing a government contract in Turkey.

In addition to his work in mobile finance and regulatory technology, Mishuk has been involved in the development of Nagad Digital Bank PLC, the country's first digital bank. The initiative is designed to provide mobile-based banking services, with features such as AI-driven credit scoring, micro-savings, and collateral-free lending.

A Dhaka court dismissed a general diary filed on 12 September 2024 by Nagad Administrator Badiuzzaman Dider against Mishuk, citing a WhatsApp message as threatening. The general diary was dismissed during a hearing on 20 October 2024, according to Banani Police Station.

== Recognitions ==
- Fastest to Unicorn Award by the government of Bangladesh
- WITSA's Global ICT Excellence Award (2020)
- Fintech Personality of the Year (2022) by Global Brands Magazine
- Kotler Iconic Achiever of the Year (2023)
