= Mohammadpur Central University College =

- মোহাম্মদপুর কেন্দ্রীয় বিশ্ববিদ্যালয় কলেজ
- Motto: "Knowledge Is Power"
- Type: Private university college
- Established: 1972; 54 years ago
- Affiliations: National University of Bangladesh, University Grants Commission, Bangladesh
- Principal: Professor Dr. H.M Wali Ullah
- Academic staff: 150
- Students: 9,000 (in 2019)
- Location: MohammadMpur, Dhaka, Bangladesh; 23.762276°N 90.359849°E
- Campus: Urban
- Colors: Blue and White
- Website: mkc.edu.bd

Mohammadpur Central University College is an undergraduate college in Dhaka, Bangladesh established in 1972. The college is basically a merger of three independent institutions — Dhanmondi Central College, Mohammadpur College and Mohammadpur Girls College. The founding committee to administer the institution was headed by Fazlul Halim Chowdhury, the longest-serving vice-chancellor of the University of Dhaka.

The college awards degrees having the National University of Bangladesh as parent institution. Teaching plans are open for its instructors to make on their own, but major examinations are held under syllabus, schedule and administration of the National University.
