= Ayman Sadiq =

Bangladeshi educator and entrepreneur

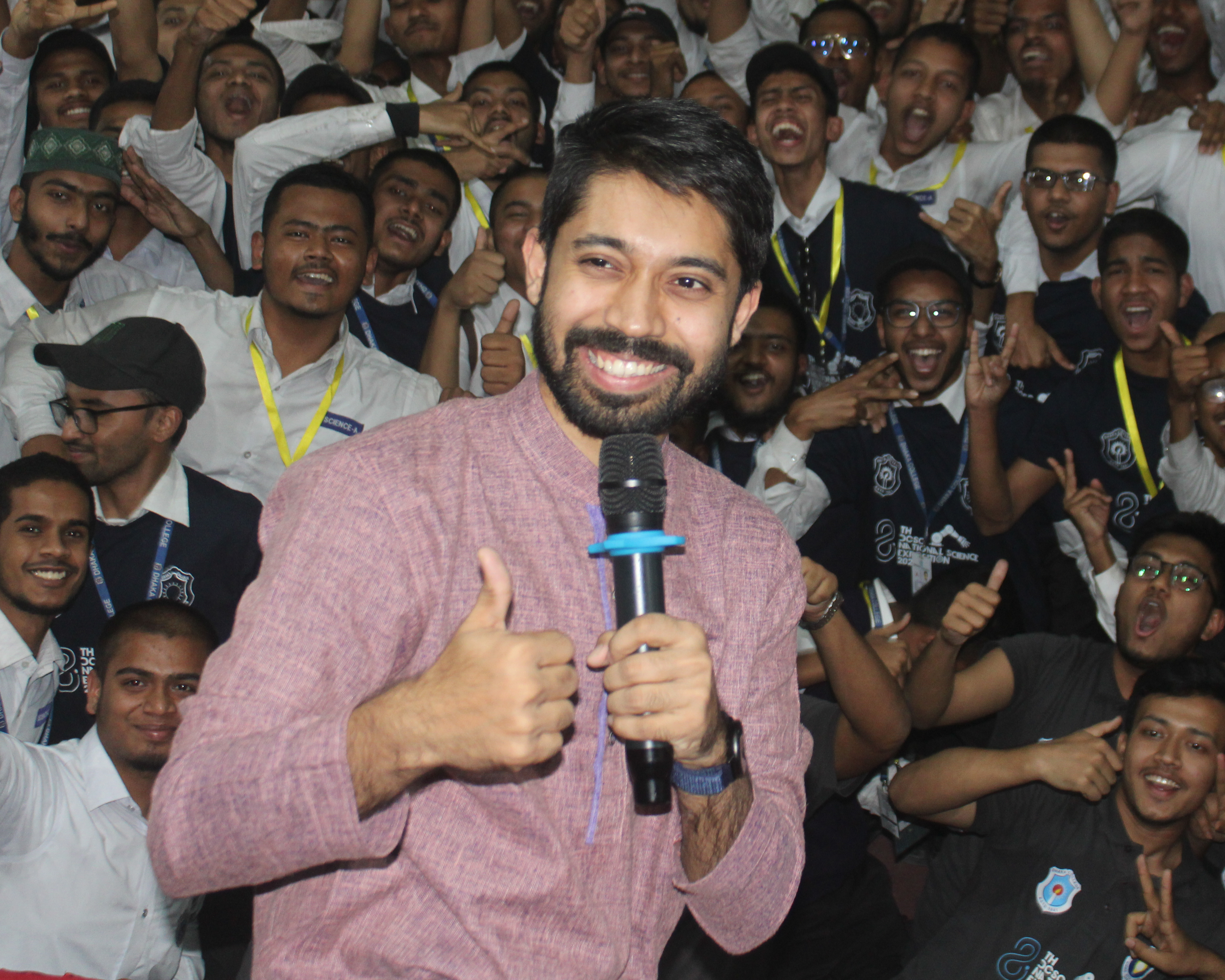
- Sadiq at Dhaka College, 2023
- Born: আয়মান সাদিক; September 2, 1992 (age 34); Comilla, Bangladesh
- Education: Institute of Business Administration, University of Dhaka
- Occupations: Teacher; Author; YouTuber; Content creator; Internet personality

YouTube information
- Channel: Ayman Sadiq
- Years active: 2016–present
- Genres: E-learning; Social skills; Motivational speaking; Comedy
- Subscribers: 2.37 million
- Views: 138.7 million
- Last updated: June 29, 2025
- Website: aymansadiq.com

Ayman Sadiq (Bengali: আয়মান সাদিক; born 2 September 1992) is a Bangladeshi educator, entrepreneur, and founder of 10 Minute School, an online platform that provides free educational resources. He has received several awards, including the Queen's Young Leader Award and has been listed in Forbes "30 Under 30 Asia."

== Early life and education ==
Ayman Sadiq was born on 2 September 1992 in Comilla, Bangladesh. He pursued his higher education at the Institute of Business Administration (IBA), University of Dhaka. During his time as a student, Sadiq was actively involved in various student competitions and won several, including Biz Maestros, Brandwidth, and Future Leader League. His early inclination toward education led him to become a tutor, which later inspired him to establish his educational platform, 10 Minute School.

== Career and 10 Minute School ==
Ayman Sadiq is the Founder CEO of 10 Minute School, the largest online education platform in Bangladesh. The platform offers a wide range of free educational content, including video tutorials, quizzes, and live classes, reaching over 250,000 students daily. Sadiq stated that he started 10 Minute School to overcome the economic and geographic barriers to quality education in Bangladesh and his goal was to provide a "one-stop solution" for education across various disciplines. 10 Minute School has over 30,000 educational videos and interactive lessons to millions of students across Bangladesh.

== Awards and recognition ==
Ayman Sadiq has been recognized for his contributions to education and entrepreneurship on multiple global platforms. He was awarded the IDLC-Prothom Alo SME Award in 2022 for significant role in promoting e-learning in Bangladesh. He was also included in Forbes' "30 Under 30 Asia" list in 2018, which highlights young innovators and disruptors across the Asia-Pacific region. He has also received the Queen's Young Leader Award in 2018, which honors exceptional young leaders from the Commonwealth countries. Additionally, his platform, 10 Minute School, won the Asia Pacific ICT Alliance (APICTA) Award, often regarded as the "Oscars of ICT," for being the best e-learning initiative. The platform also received the GLOMO Award at the World Mobile Congress.

== Personal life ==
Ayman Sadiq is married to Munzereen Shahid, who is also involved in educational content creation. They married in 2023.
