= Mohammadpur Preparatory School & College =

- মোহাম্মদপুর প্রিপারেটরি স্কুল এন্ড কলেজ

Location
- 15/1, Iqbal Road, Mohammadpur (Girls' Wing); Dhaka; Bangladesh; 23.7601°N 90.3702°E

Information
- Other name: MPSC
- Type: School & College
- Motto: জ্ঞানই শক্তি (Knowledge Is Power)
- Established: 1976
- School board: Dhaka Education Board
- School code: 132107
- Chairman: Prof. Dr. Mohammad Tamim
- Principal: Dr. Mohammad Anwarul islam
- Grades: PG-12th
- Gender: Boys & Girls
- Age range: 5-20
- Average class size: 40-50 students
- Education system: NCTB
- Language: Bengali & English
- Sports: volleyball, handball
- Website: mpsc.edu.bd

Mohammadpur Preparatory School and College (Bengali: মোহাম্মদপুর প্রিপারেটরি স্কুল এন্ড কলেজ) also known as MPSC, is one of the leading educational institutions of Bangladesh located in Mohammadpur, Dhaka, Bangladesh. It is run by a governing body under the direct supervision and control of the "Board of Trustees." This institution has won the national Best School Award twice. The institution's music team scored first place for 'pure tune' in the 2018 and 2019 national anthem competitions among all institutions in Bangladesh.

== History ==
Understanding the aftermath of the liberation war of Bangladesh in 1976, some dedicated residents agreed to build an ideal educational institution to provide quality education to the children of that area, and thus Mohammadpur Preparatory School and College was established in 1976. Through sustained effort and commitment, Mohammadpur Preparatory School and College grew from offering PG, KG, and first grade classes into a full-fledged high school. In 1993, Class XI was introduced at Mohammadpur Preparatory Girls College.

In 2004, a college branch was established at 3/3 Asad Avenue, Mohammadpur, Dhaka to provide improved educational opportunities for boys in the area.Though it is much smaller than the Girls' wing, it is also a prosperous school in Dhaka.

Continuing this progress, the authorities initiated a project in 1996 to establish a university and applied for government approval. After five years, Bangladesh University was founded in 2001 and received official permission to begin academic activities.

== Academics ==
The institution offers two systems of education, Bengali Medium and English Version. There are three separate wings: Girls' Wing, Boys' Wing and the Preschool Wing. The schedule has two shifts: the Morning shift and the Day shift. The students of Bengali Medium follow the schedule of the morning shift and the students of English Version follow the schedule of the day shift. Students from this institution appear in PEC, JSC, SSC and HSC public examinations. The school curriculum includes traditional secondary and higher secondary school academic subjects assigned by Dhaka Education Board.
