= Hafiz Siddiqi =

Vice-Chancellor of North South University
- In office 3 January 2003 – 2010

Personal details
- Born: 1931 Hazaribagh, Bengal Presidency, British India
- Died: 22 May 2018 (aged 86–87) Dhaka, Bangladesh
- Education: BA, MA, MPIA, PhD
- Alma mater: University of Dhaka; University of Pittsburgh; Indiana University Bloomington; University of Manchester
- Occupation: academic

Hafiz G. A. Siddiqi (1931 – 22 May 2018) was a Bangladeshi academic. He served as the vice-chancellor of North South University and the director of Institute of Business Administration, University of Dhaka.

== Early life and education ==
After finishing class 4, Siddiqi decided to completely memorize the Quran. Four years later, after the memorization, he earned the title Hafiz and went back to a regular school.

Siddiqi got his bachelor's and master's in economics from the University of Dhaka. He earned MPIA (Master of Public and International Affairs) degree from University of Pittsburgh Graduate School of Public and International Affairs and MBA degree from Kelley School of Business at the Indiana University Bloomington. He obtained his Ph.D. degree from Manchester Business School at the University of Manchester.

== Career ==
Siddiqi started teaching at Institute of Business Administration, University of Dhaka, where he served for 20 years. He later became the director of the institute. He moved to the United States and was appointed a professor of international business and management at Ohio State University and Minnesota State University for eight years.

Siddiqi joined North South University in 1993. He became the pro-vice-chancellor in 1998 and the vice-chancellor of the same university in 2003. After an early retirement in 2010, Siddiqi joined BRAC University as a professor emeritus.

In 2008, Siddiqi worked as a depositor director of BRAC Bank. On 6 November 2008, Siddiqi was appointed a director of Bangladesh Bank. He worked as a consultant to World Bank, Asian Development Bank and United Nations Economic and Social Commission for Asia and the Pacific.

== Works ==
Siddiq authored 14 books in total.

- The Readymade Garment Industry of Bangladesh (2004)

== Death ==
Siddiqui died on 22 May 2018, at United Hospital, Dhaka. His funeral and burial were held on 28 May at Gulshan Lakepar Cemetery in Dhaka.
