= People's University of Bangladesh =

University in Dhaka, Bangladesh

The People's University of Bangladesh
- Motto: To enhance the opportunities for higher education
- Type: Private
- Established: 1996
- Chancellor: President Hafiz Uddin Ahmad
- Vice-Chancellor: Md Alauddin
- Location: 3/4 asad avenue, Dhaka (beside St. Joseph Higher Secondary School), Bangladesh; 23.7602°N 90.3703°E
- Campus: Urban
- Website: pub.ac.bd

The People's University of Bangladesh or PUB is a non-profit educational institution located at Dhaka, Bangladesh.

== History ==
People's University of Bangladesh was established on 14 May 1996 as a private university under the Private University Act 1992. The university has two own campuses, one at Mohammadpur and the other one located at Sristighar, Shibpur, Narsingdi.

Shirazul Islam Mollah, chairman of Prime Bank and member of parliament, is the chairman of PUB. The University Grants Commission (UGC) of Bangladesh has approved its syllabi and curricula. The first convocation was held on 29 October 2007 at Bangladesh China Friendship Conference Centre.

In 2016, University Grants Commission (UGC) said that it would not recognize certificates from the People's University of Bangladesh as it did not have a vice-chancellor. In 2015, The Daily Star reported that members of the board of directors had filed cases against each other over internal disputes. The report also stated the university was running illegal campuses outside of Dhaka using a stay order from Bangladesh High Court. In 2018, UGC issued a red notice against the university as a warning to potential students.

== List of vice-chancellors ==
- A.K.M Salahuddin
- Md Abdul Mannan Chowdhury
- Md Alauddin (11 April 2024 - incumbent)

== Academic programs ==
The PUB offers courses in different disciplines in school of Arts, Applied Science and Business Administration.

Faculty of Business & Social Studies

- Bachelor of Business Administration (BBA)
- Bachelor of Sociology & Social Work (BSS)
- Master Of Business Administration(MBA)
- Tourism and Hospitality Management (THM)
- Diploma in Computer Application in Business

School of Applied Science

- B.Sc. in Computer Science and Engineering
- B.Sc. in Textile Engineering
- M.Sc. in Computer Science and Engineering
- B.Sc. in Electronics and Telecommunication Engineering
- B.Sc. (Hons.) in Physiotherapy(BSPT)
- Diploma in Physiotherapy (DPT)

School of Arts

- B.A.(Honors) in English
- M.A.(Final) in English
- B.A. (Honors) in Islamic Studies & Culture
- M.A. (preliminary) in Islamic Studies & Culture
- M.A. (Final) in Islamic Studies & Culture
