= Mohammad Ponir Hossain =

First Bangladeshi Pulitzer Prize recipients

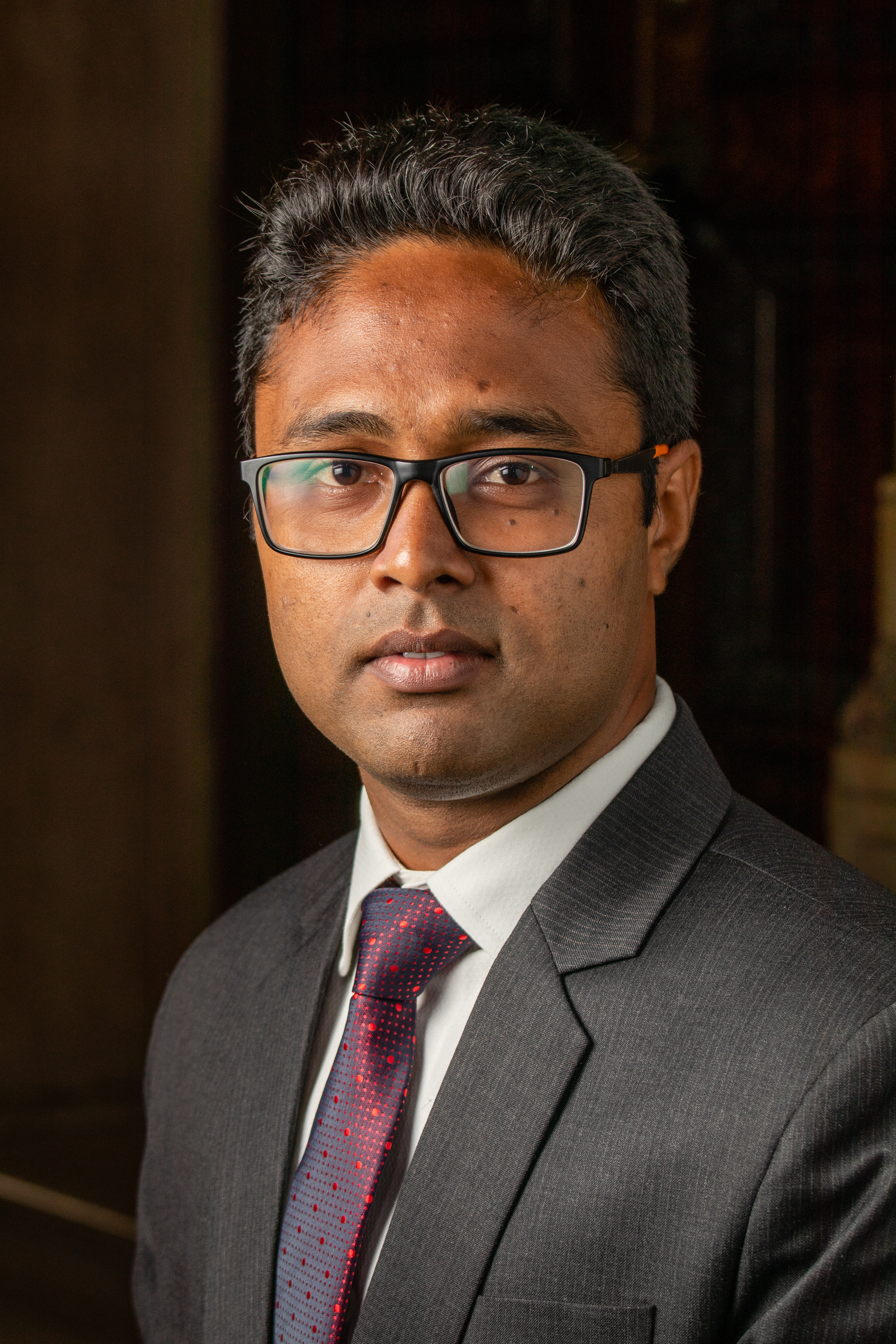
- Born: May 10, 1989 (age 36); Sirajdikhan, Munshiganj, Bangladesh
- Education: BBA, visual journalism
- Alma mater: Dhaka City College; North South University; Ateneo De Manila University
- Occupations: Journalist and photographer
- Employer: Reuters
- Awards: Pulitzer Prize

Mohammad Ponir Hossain (born 10 May 1989) is a Bangladeshi photographer and journalist. He won the 2018 Pulitzer Prize for Feature Photography as part of Reuters' photography staff for his pictures of Rohingya refugees in Bangladesh. Pulitzer authorities selected sixteen photos by seven Reuters journalists, three taken by Hossain.

== Early life and education ==
Hossain was born on 10 May 1989 in Guakhola village of Sirajdikhan in Munshiganj. He is the son of Mohammad Jamal Uddin and Alija Begum, the third of five siblings.

He started his education at Basail Government Primary School in Munshiganj. He passed SSC from Khwaja Ajmeri High School in Chittagong in 2005 and HSC from Dhaka City College in 2007. He completed his BA Honors in Marketing from the North South University in 2015. He received a Post Graduate Diploma in visual journalism from the Ateneo de Manila University in a scholarship for photojournalism. There he acquired the rules and ethics of photojournalism.

== Career ==
On 1 July 2016, Hossain joining working as a photojournalist for Thomson Reuters. Previously worked for the ZUMA Press from 2015 to 2016. 12 photographs captured by the Reuters Pulitzer winning team, three were taken by Hossain. He was the first Bangladeshi to be named in the Pulitzer Prize history.

Hossain became the second national stage of Bangladesh in World Photography in 2016. It was considered his first success. He was also a contributor to NUR photo. He trained in the UK to "take pictures at a critical moment".
