= Dhanmondi Thana =

Thana in Dhaka South City Corporation, Bangladesh

Dhanmondi ধানমন্ডি
- Neighbourhood and Thana
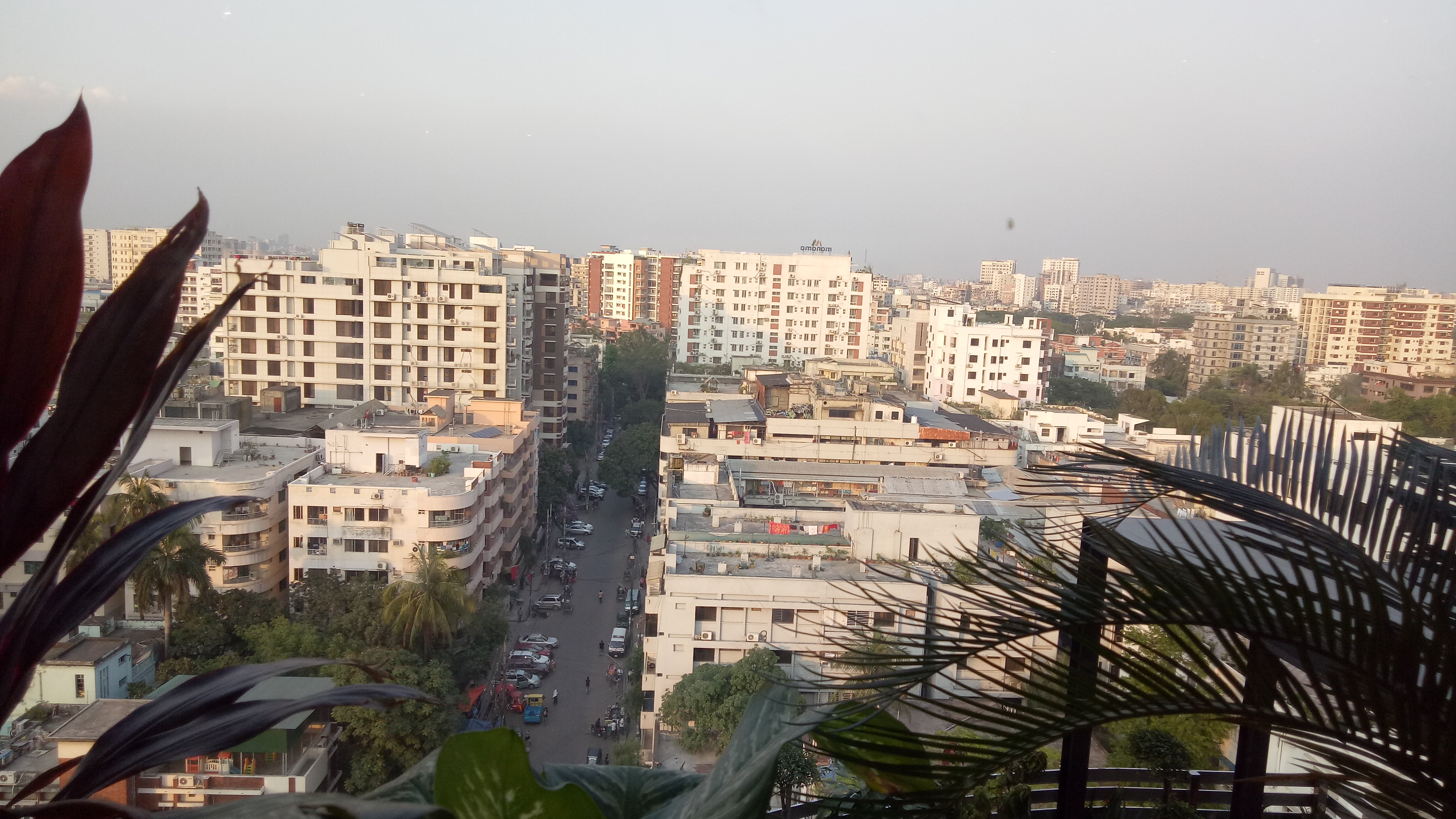
- Skyline of Dhanmondi, Bangladesh
- Interactive map of Dhanmondi
- Location of Dhanmondi Thana within Dhaka Location of Dhanmondi Thana within Dhaka Division Location of Dhanmondi Thana within Bangladesh
- Coordinates: 23°44.7′N 90°22.6′E
- Country: Bangladesh
- Division: Dhaka Division
- District: Dhaka District

Area
  - Total: 4.34 km^{2} (1.68 sq mi)
- Elevation: 23 m (75 ft)

Population (2022)
  - Total: 101,937
  - Density: 23,500/km^{2} (60,800/sq mi)
- Time zone: UTC+6 (BST)
- Postal code: 1209
- Area code: 02
- Notable sport teams: Sheikh Jamal

Dhanmondi (Bengali: ধানমন্ডি) is an upscale residential and commercial neighbourhood and a thana (police jurisdiction) in Dhaka, Bangladesh, known for its central location, cultural vibrancy and being home to the country's founding president, Sheikh Mujibur Rahman. Dhanmondi Thana falls within the administrative areas of both the Dhaka North and Dhaka South city corporations.

The origins of Dhanmondi can be traced back to the early 1950s, when the Government of East Pakistan developed it as a centrally planned residential area catering to the city's elites.

== History ==
During the British colonial period, the area that is now Dhanmondi had a canal next to it and was primarily used for cultivation, interspersed with a few settlements. It was known for its rice (ধান, dhan in Bengali) and other grain seed markets. The term mandi in Persian and Urdu refers to a market or bazaar, hence the area came to be known as Dhanmondi. By the 19th century, the canal dried up, making the market there less significant. Dhanmondi subsequently became forested and remained that way until the mid-twentieth century.

In 1950, the government of East Pakistan acquired roughly 500 acres of agricultural and horticultural land, and leveled and divided it into plots, each approximately one bigha (0.33 acres) in size. These plots were allocated to ministers, government officials, public figures, professionals, and businesspeople based on specific criteria. The Dhaka Improvement Trust (DIT), established in 1956, oversaw the development of public amenities, construction of roads, and implementation of other infrastructure projects. Wide roads were laid out in a grid pattern, with vegetation planted along roadsides and in public areas. Plots were leased to allottees for 99 years at a rate of ৳5,000 per bigha. While initially the DIT strictly designated Dhanmondi plots for residential purposes, by 1972, this rule was considerably relaxed to the extent that it was virtually not enforced anymore.

Sheikh Mujibur Rahman, regarded as the founding father of Bangladesh, resided in Dhanmondi at road no. 32. He was assassinated along with most of his family at his residence on 15 August 1975. Today, his former residence has been converted into a memorial museum.

Over the decades Dhanmondi evolved into a chic, miniature city, with hospitals to malls, schools, banks, offices and universities. After the liberation war, its neighbourhoods primarily consisted of two-story houses. Dhanmondi Thana was formed in 1976.

== Geography ==
Dhanmondi Thana covers 4.34 km^{2} (1.68 sq mi), bordered by Mohammadpur Thana to the north, New Market Thana to the east and the south, Hazaribagh Thana to the south and the west. Sher-e-Bangla Nagar and Kalabagan thanas occupies the eastern border.

== Demographics ==
In the 2022 Bangladeshi census, Dhanmondi Thana recorded a total population of 101,937, distributed between the two city corporations. The Dhaka North section housed 75,148 residents, whereas Dhaka South accommodated 26,789 residents, with a combined total of 27,487 households and an average household size of 3.7 members. The recorded population in 2022 reflects a decrease from the 2011 figures, which stood at 147,643 individuals.

== Places of interest ==
=== Roads ===
The most important roads in Dhanmondi include Road No. 27

, Sat Masjid Road, and Mirpur Road, which serve as major commercial and residential thoroughfares.

=== Dhanmondi Lake ===
Dhanmondi Lake is a central recreational space in the area. The lakeside walkway features the Rabindra Sarobar, an open-air amphitheater near Road 8, which hosts cultural programs, concerts, and theatre productions throughout the year.

Several food stalls and cafés line the lakeside, particularly around Road 2, Road 5, Road 8, and Road 32. These locations are popular gathering spots in the late afternoon and evening. During major festivals such as Pohela Boishakh, Independence Day, and Eid ul-Fitr, the lake area attracts large crowds.

=== Cultural and Historical Sites ===
- Bangabandhu Bhaban (House 32, Road 32), the former residence of Sheikh Mujibur Rahman, now preserved as a museum.
- Rabindra Sarobar amphitheater, used for concerts, cultural festivals, and theatre performances.

== Education ==
Over the last fifteen years, a large number of schools, colleges and few private universities have been developed around the area.

Many well-known English medium schools in the country, such as Scholastica (Junior Section), South Breeze, Sunbeams, Oxford International School Main Campus and Junior Dhanmondi Campus, Mastermind, Maple Leaf International school, Marie Curie School, Sunnydale, European Standard School (ESS) are located in this area.

Dhaka City College is also located here. Among the universities University Of Development Alternative (UODA) is located here.University Of Liberal Arts Bangladesh (ULAB) also has a campus here.

== Gallery ==
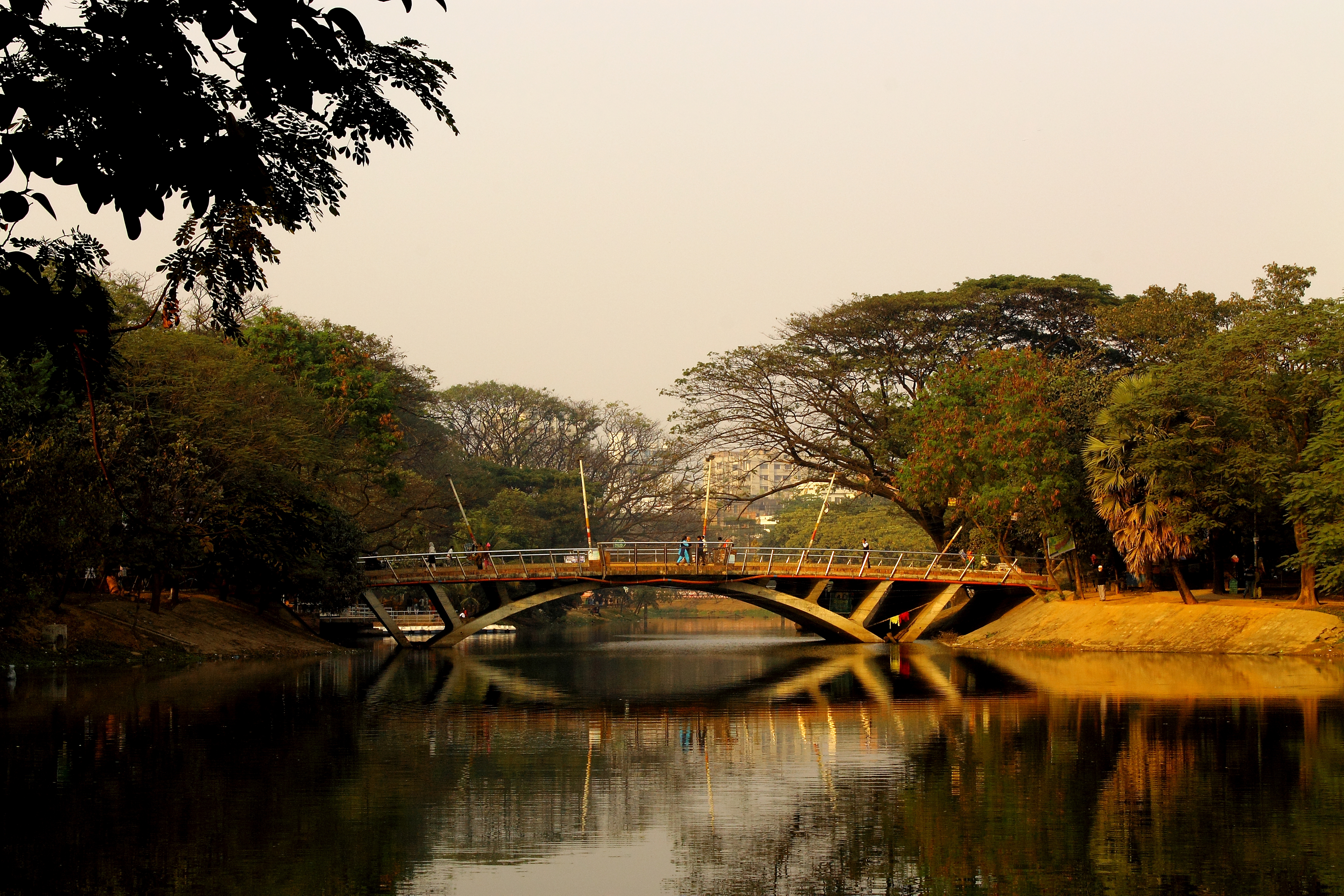
Bridge over Dhanmondi Lake

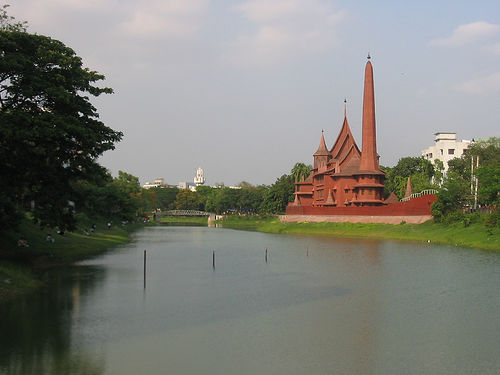
Dhanmondi Lake.

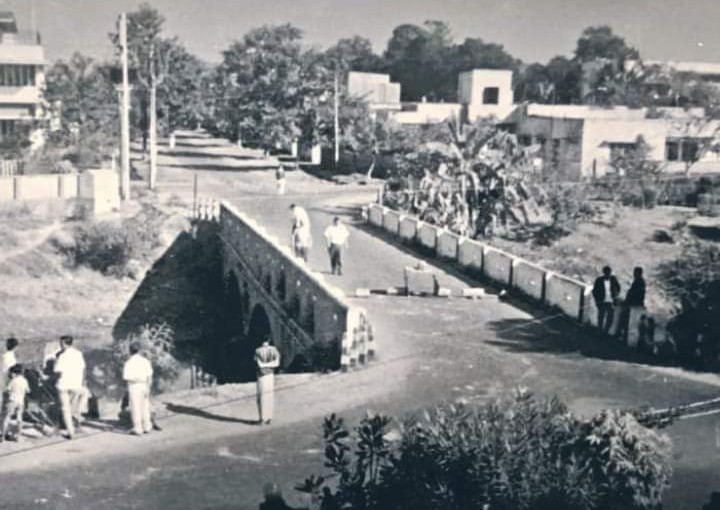
Dhanmondi 32 bridge in 1966

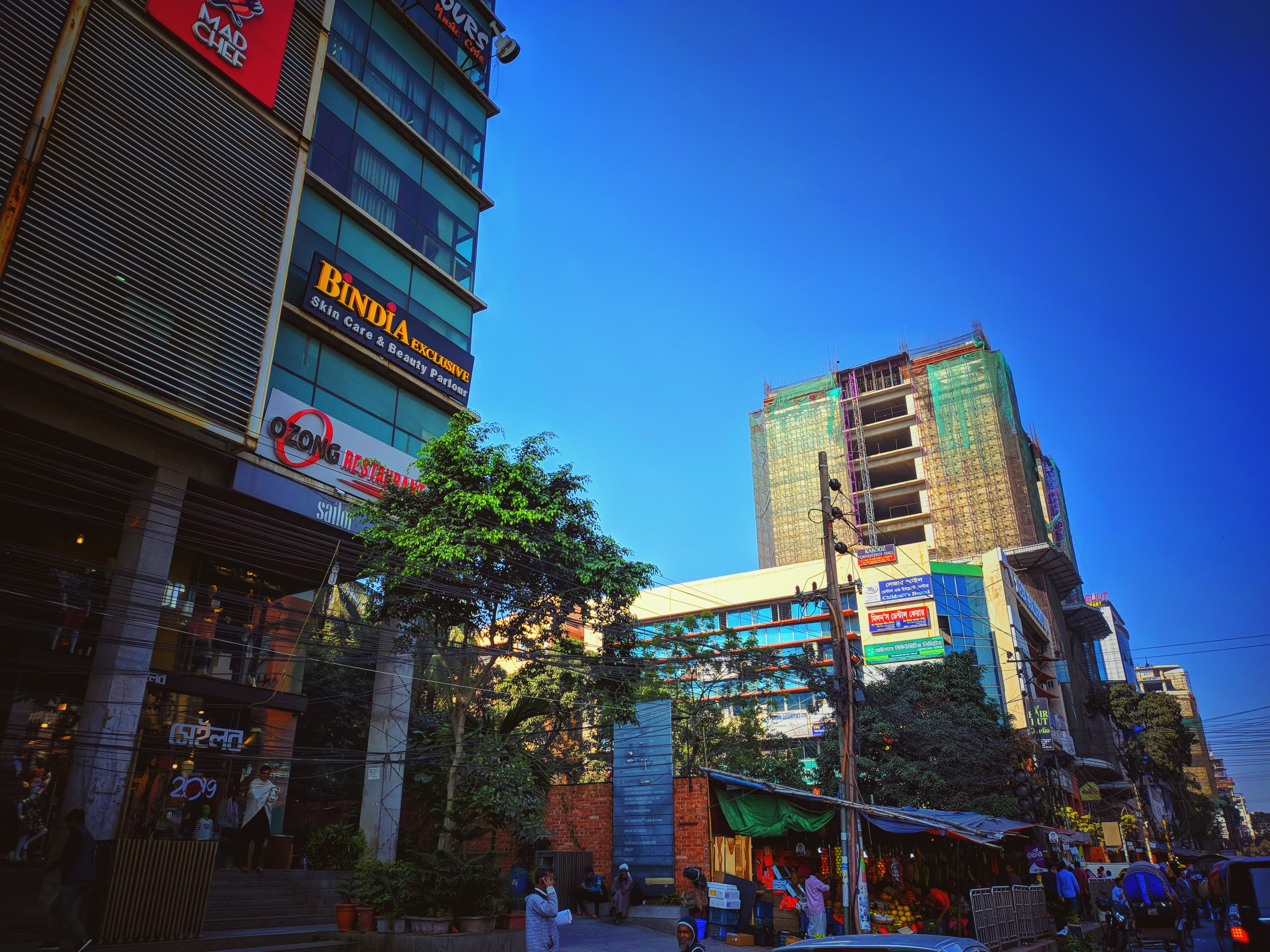
Shops and restaurants at Satmasjid Road

== See also ==
- Dhanmondi Lake
- Thanas of Bangladesh
