= Aydha Mehnaz =

Bangladeshi fashion manager

- আইদা মেহনাজ
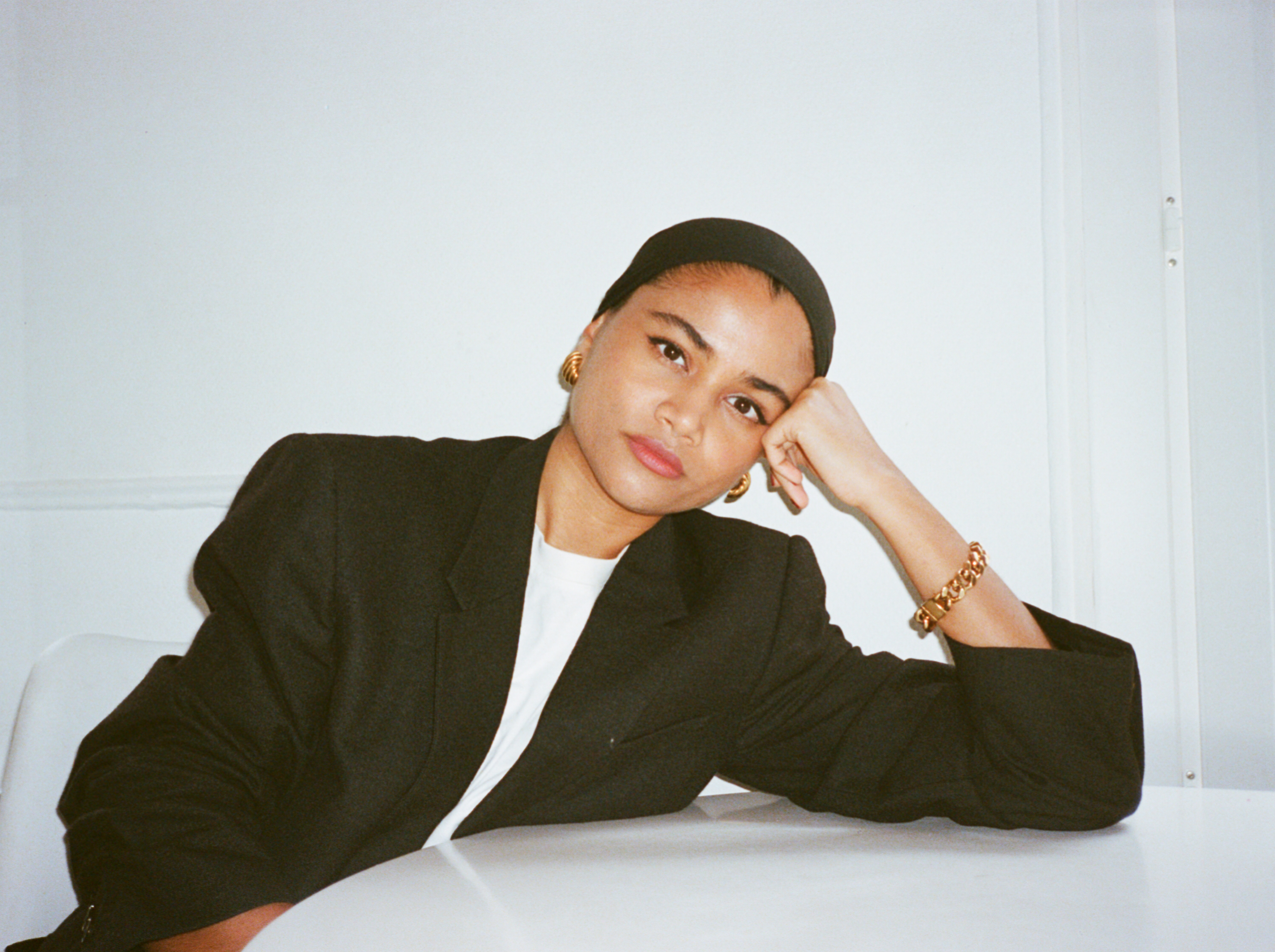
- Mehnaz in 2024
- Born: 1994 or 1995 (age 31–32); Narayanganj, Bangladesh
- Education: North South University; ESMOD
- Occupations: Fashion and media professional
- Years active: 2014-present
- Organization(s): Moynat, LVMH
- Website: www.aydhamehnaz.com/

Aydha Mehnaz (born 1994 or 1995) is a Bangladeshi-French fashion and media professional based between Paris and New York City. She currently serves as the Global Brand Relations Lead at Moynat, a French luxury travel leather goods and accessories house under LVMH.

Previously, she was the Manager of Celebrity and Media Relations at Mugler, a luxury brand owned by L'Oréal Group. Recognized for her contributions to the modest fashion industry, she has been featured in Forbes' 30 Under 30 — Europe — Media & Marketing in 2024, becoming the first Bangladeshi to be featured in that list.

== Early life and family ==
Mehnaz was born and raised in the town of Narayanganj, Dhaka, in either 1994 or 1995. Born into a conservative Muslim family, she is the youngest of two siblings. Mehnaz is the eldest niece of the Bangladeshi industrialist Reazuddin Al Mamoon, the chairman of Epyllion Group.

== Education ==
She attended BAF Shaheen English Medium School in Dhaka from the age of 9 until 16 and later went on to completing her O-levels from HURDCO International School in 2010, and she finished her A level education from Mastermind School in 2012.

From 2012 through 2017, Mehnaz attended North South University graduating with a bachelor’s degree majoring in Biochemistry and Biotechnology. Later in the Fall of 2017, she pursued a double master’s degree in Luxury Brand Management from ESMOD Paris, graduating in 2019. In 2022, she served as the Jury President and class sponsor for the graduating class of ESMOD’s Fashion Business School.

== Career ==
Mehnaz launched a fashion blog titled Minazification, while still in university, which gained traction in Southeast Asian countries like Singapore, Malaysia, and Indonesia. The blog became popular for its hijab, fashion and makeup tutorials. She worked as an international contributor for Aquila Style Singapore, and as a panel speaker in various fashion forums across Indonesia, Malaysia, United Arab Emirates, Turkey and France.

From 2014-2017, she worked as a fashion marketing analyst, and later as communications and digital lead at Sailor by Epyllion, a consumer fashion and lifestyle brand based in Bangladesh. In 2016, she collaborated with a Bangladeshi footwear label to launch her first collaboration series called ‘Aydha’.

=== Mugler ===
In Paris, as part of her master’s program, she has interned for the fashion brand Rick Owens and international PR agency, KCD, before joining Mugler in 2019, a French Luxury fashion and fragrance brand, as a communications assistant. Within Mugler, she has held several positions as a Communications Coordinator, Image and Communications Officer since then. In 2022, she was promoted to the Manager of Celebrity and Media Relations for the fashion division, where her role was to maintain and nurture key relationships with top talents globally, contributing to the brand’s viral visibility and awareness.

Under her leadership, Mugler experienced a notable increase in media impact value, rising from $58 million pre-Covid to over $200 million. During her tenure, the brand-initiated collaborations with artists such as Dua Lipa, Kylie Jenner, Beyoncé, Cardi B, Megan Thee Stallion, Ariana Grande, Miley Cyrus, and Bad Bunny, and facilitated memorable moments such as Beyoncé's Mugler bee look and several viral appearances by Kylie Jenner and Zendaya.

=== Moynat ===
After her role at Mugler, Aydha Mehnaz joined Moynat, a luxury brand under LVMH, in mid-2024 as the Global Brand Relations Lead. In 2025, Mehnaz collaborated with the Moynat team that built a "dog-centered campaign for the 520 festival in China," which went viral.

== Recognition ==
Mehnaz has been featured in several international media outlets, such as Vogue France, Vogue Germany, Vogue Arabia, Harper's Bazaar, SWR Fernsehen, Somoy TV, Ice Today, Basement Approved, and The Business Standard. According to fashion media outlets such as Vogue and Harper's Bazaar, she is regarded as a pioneer in the modest fashion network, and one of the most sought-after modest fashion profiles globally.

- Harper's Bazaar Arabia — 17 Modest wear bloggers to follow, 2018
- Vogue Arabia — Top 16 Muslim Influencers in Modern Modest Fashion, 2021
- The Daily Star — Top 13 Bangladeshis making names in the global arena, 2021
- Forbes — 30 Under 30 — Europe — Media & Marketing, 2024
- Forbes — Judge — 30 Under 30 — Europe — Media & Marketing, 2025
- ELLE: Embracing Culture and Redefining Style, 2025
