= 10 Minute School =

Bangladeshi online educational platform

- Native name: ১০ মিনিট স্কুল
- Type: Private
- Industry: EdTech
- Founded: 2015
- Founder: Ayman Sadiq
- Headquarters: Dhaka, Bangladesh
- Area served: Bangladesh
- Products: Online courses, Mobile application
- Services: E-learning
- Owner: Ayman Sadiq
- Website: 10minuteschool.com

10 Minute School (Bengali: ১০ মিনিট স্কুল) is a Bangladeshi online education platform founded in 2015 by Ayman Sadiq. It provides academic courses for school and university students, as well as skill-development training through web and mobile applications.

== History ==
The 10 Minute School website was launched on 17 May 2015, followed by a YouTube channel in August of that year. At first it offered short video lessons for mathematics and English. The platform later expanded to cover the national curriculum for classes 1–12 in Bangladesh, university admission preparation, and various skill-development courses.

In its early years, 10 Minute School primarily used social media for content distribution. Over time, it developed a full-scale digital learning platform with live classes, recorded lessons, quizzes, and mobile applications.

The platform later received support and partnerships from various organizations and investors. One of its official sponsors was the Bangladeshi telecommunications company Robi. In 2022, it raised seed funding from international investors, including Sequoia Capital.

== Courses and programs ==
10 Minute School offers:

- Academic classes for Classes 1–12
- University admission preparation
- Skills development courses
- Professional and vocational training programs
- Live online classes and recorded video lessons

== Platform ==
10 Minute School operates through its official website and mobile applications on Android and iOS. The platform provides:

- Video lectures
- Live classes
- Digital practice tests
- Learning analytics

== Organization ==
- Founder & CEO: Ayman Sadiq

== Impact ==
10 Minute School is one of the most widely used online learning platforms in Bangladesh. It played a significant role in expanding digital education access, especially during the COVID-19 pandemic time when educational institutions were closed.
