= South Breeze School =

- Dhaka; Bangladesh

Information
- Type: Private school
- Founded: 1 November 1986
- Principal: Zeenat Chowdhury
- Years offered: Playgroup to IALs
- Years taught: Playgroup to IGCSEs
  - Primary: Playgroup to Class V
  - Secondary: Class VI to IGCSE
- Gender: Co-educational
- Campuses: Dhanmondi, Bosila, Uttara
- Color: White Grey Maroon
- Team name: Wolves
- Website: https://southbreezeschoolbd.com/

South Breeze School is a private English medium educational institution located in Dhaka, Bangladesh, founded in 1986. It offers primary and secondary education under the Edexcel International GCSE curriculum. It operates several campuses across the city and has been represented in national academic achievement awards. The school is registered with Pearson Edexcel and is a partner school of British Council Bangladesh. South Breeze School is also recognised by the Ministry of Education, Bangladesh.

Founded by Principal Zeenat Chowdhury, the original campus was located in Dhanmondi. The campus was relocated in 2000, and in 2004, an additional dedicated campus was opened in Uttara. As of October 2026, the school maintains campuses in Dhanmondi (Classes I to V) and Bosila (Classes VI to XII), as well as a full-range Uttara campus.

== Academics ==
The school follows the British IGCSE syllabus and the students are taught for Ordinary level (O-level) examinations conducted by Edexcel International. The school has been one of the leading ones in Bangladesh in terms of O-level results since 1990, when the first batch of students graduated from the school. South Breeze students have consistently maintained a large presence at the annual Daily Star awards ceremonies for high-achieving O-level and A-level students, and have been selected as valedictorians in 2000 (Dibya Huq), 2004 (Asheque Shams) and 2010 (Intekhab Hossain).
