= Bangladesh University =

Private university in Dhaka, Bangladesh

- Type: Private
- Established: 2001; 25 years ago
- Founder: Quazi Azhar Ali
- Affiliations: University Grants Commission Bangladesh
- Chancellor: President Mirza Fakhrul Islam Alamgir
- Vice-Chancellor: Md. Jahangir Alam
- Academic staff: 160
- Administrative staff: 110
- Students: 6,500+
- Location: 5/B, Beribandh Main Road, Adabar, Mohammadpur, Dhaka 1207, Dhaka, Bangladesh; 23.7672°N 90.3447°E
- Campus: 5/B, Beribandh Main Road, Adabar, Mohammadpur, Dhaka 1207.
- Website: bu.edu.bd

Bangladesh University (BU) (Bengali: বাংলাদেশ বিশ্ববিদ্যালয়) is a private university located at Mohmmadpur in Dhaka, Bangladesh. The university was established in 2001 under the Private University Act 1992. The university's founder was Quazi Azhar Ali, who served as the first vice chancellor of the university from 2001 to 2009.

== Faculties and departments ==
Bangladesh University has the following faculties and departments:

Faculty of Business Administration & Economics

- Dept. of Business Administration
- Dept. of Economics

Faculty of Science, Engineering and Technology

- Dept. of Computer Science and Engineering (CSE)
- Dept. of Architecture
- Dept. of Electrical and Electronic Engineering (EEE)
- Mathematics
- Pharmacy

Faculty of Arts, Social Science & Law

- Dept. of English
- Dept. of Law
- Dept. of Sociology

== Academic calendar ==
The academic system of BU consists with three semesters:

- Spring semester
- Summer semester
- Fall semester

The academic system of BU for Engineering consists with two semesters:

- Spring semester
- Fall semester

== List of vice-chancellors ==
- Quazi Azhar Ali
- Anwarul Haque Sharif
- Mesbah Kamal
- Md. Jahangir Alam, Current Vice-Chancellor
