= Atiqul Islam (academic) =

Vice-Chancellor (VC) of the North South University

Former Vice-Chancellor of North South University
- In office 25 February 2016 – 21 August 2024
- Chancellor: President of Bangladesh
- Preceded by: Amin U. Sarkar

Personal details
- Education: Ph.D. University of Dhaka; University of New South Wales; University of Sydney

Atiqul Islam is a Bangladeshi academic. He was the Vice-chancellor of North South University.

== Education and career ==
Islam has B.Com and M.Com degrees from the University of Dhaka. He obtained another master's from the University of New South Wales and a Ph.D. from the University of Sydney.

Islam served as the pro-vice-chancellor of Edith Cowan University in Australia and the Dean of the Faculty of Business and Government at the University of Canberra. He is a fellow of CPA Australia and a member of the Institute of Chartered Accountants in Australia and New Zealand.
