= Syed Alamgir =

Bangladeshi business executive

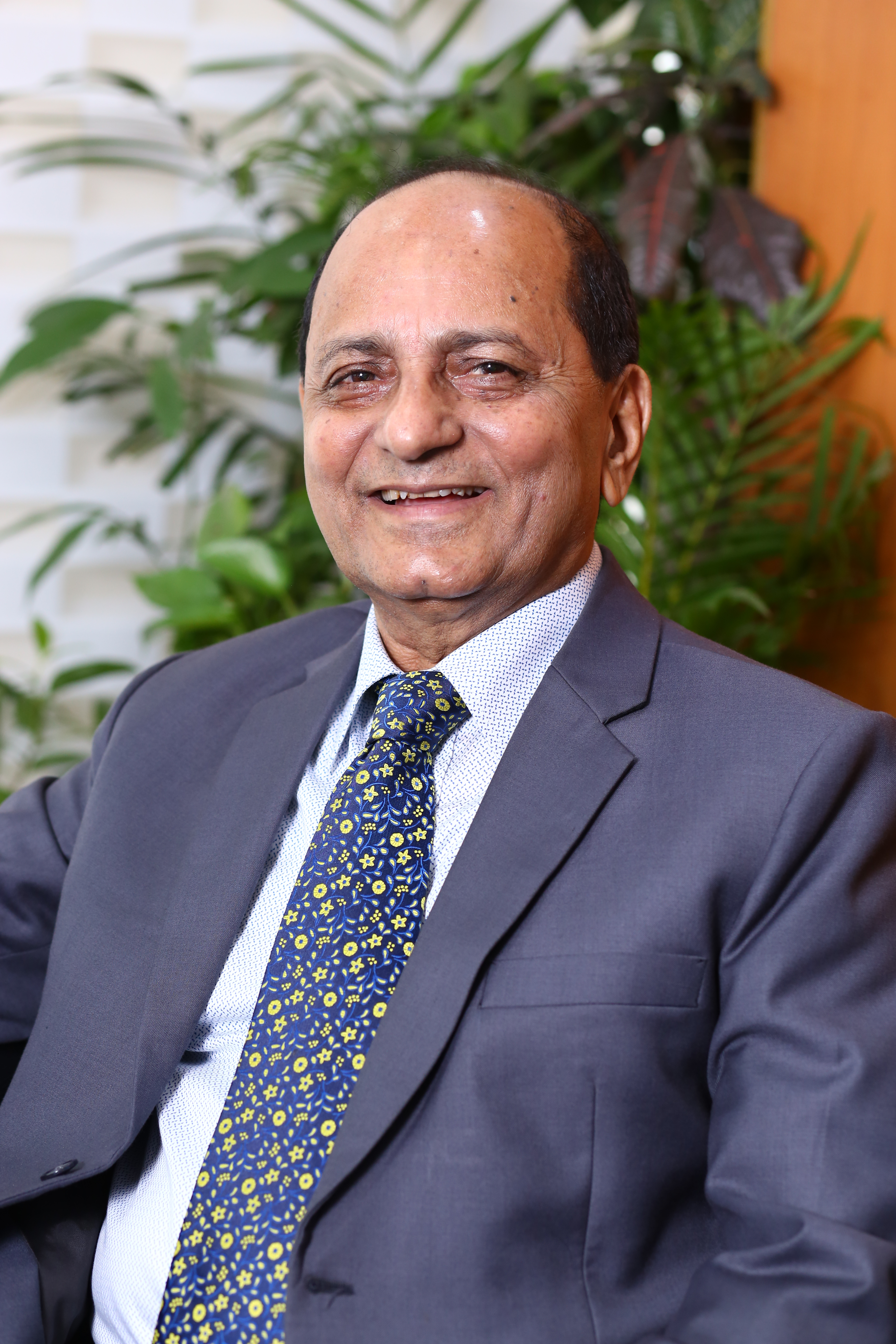
- Born: 1 August 1951 (age 75); Netrokona, East Bengal, British India
- Education: Institute of Business Administration, University of Dhaka
- Occupation: Business executive
- Spouse: Salma Alamgir
- Children: 3

Syed Alamgir (born 1 August 1951) is a Bangladeshi business executive. He is renowned for incorporating the halal concept in the fast-moving consumer goods category.

== Education ==
Alamgir was born on 1 August 1951. He completed his Master of Business Administration (MBA) from the Institute of Business Administration, University of Dhaka in 1976.

== Career ==
Alamgir started career in British Pharmaceutical Company May & Baker (currently Sanofi Aventis) in 1976.

Alamgir worked from 1992 to 1998 at Jamuna Group as group marketing director. The company had launched their Pegasus Shoes brand in 1992. Within two years he built it into the second largest footwear brand in Bangladesh, after Bata. In 1993, Jamuna launched their Aromatic line of cosmetics. By marketing Aromatic soap as halal, containing no animal fats, Alamgir helped it capture a 14% market share in the country in its first year. By replacing the tin toothpaste tubes then used in the local market with laminate tubes, Alamgir helped Aromatic toothpaste capture a 15% market share in Bangladesh.

Alamgir joined ACI Limited in 1998 as executive director. At the time, it was primarily a chemical company, with just two consumer products, Aerosol household insecticides and Savlon antiseptics. Alamgir launched 17 new product lines under ACI, including ACI Salt and PURE foods. He was promoted to managing director of ACI Consumer Brands in 2017.

Alamgir is serving as President of Bangladesh Vacuum Salt Manufacturers' Association, Bangladesh Sanitary Napkin & Diapers Manufacturers' Association, MBA Association of Bangladesh, Bangladesh-Greece Chamber of Commerce and Industry (BGCCI).

== Personal life ==
Alamgir is married to Salma Alamgir and is the father of three daughters.
