= Primeasia University =

Private university in Dhaka, Bangladesh

Primeasia University (PAU)
- প্রাইমএশিয়া বিশ্ববিদ্যালয়
- Type: Private
- Established: 2003
- Accreditation: University Grants Commission of Bangladesh, Institution of Engineers, Bangladesh, Pharmacy Council of Bangladesh
- Chairman: Md. Nazrul Islam
- Chancellor: President Hafiz Uddin Ahmad
- Vice-Chancellor: Prof. Dr. ANM Meshquat Uddin
- Academic staff: 255
- Students: 3700
- Undergraduates: 3400
- Postgraduates: 250
- Location: Star Tower, 12 Kemal Ataturk Avenue, Banani, Dhaka, Bangladesh; 23.7934°N 90.4025°E
- Website: primeasia.edu.bd
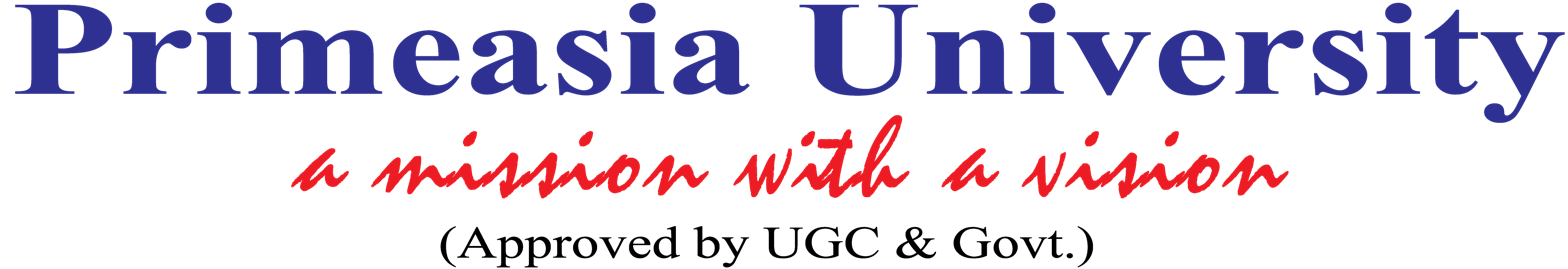

Primeasia University (Bengali: প্রাইমএশিয়া বিশ্ববিদ্যালয়, also known as PaU) is a private research university located in Dhaka, Bangladesh. It was established in 2003. The language of instruction of City University is English. The university offers undergraduate and master's degrees in the fields of business administration, computer science and engineering, textile engineering, electrical & electronics engineering, pharmacy, law, English, microbiology, biochemistry & molecular biology, international tourism & hospitality management etc.

== History ==
Primeasia University (PAU) received government permission in August 2003. Subsequently, PaU started its journey with only 35 students in the fall semester of 2003. Within a short period of time, it grew into a significantly large university.

At present, the university has textile engineering, electrical and electronic engineering, computer science and engineering, and architecture departments under the School of Engineering; Microbiology, pharmacy, biochemistry, and Public Health Nutrition (PHN) departments under the School of Biological Science; BBA, MBA, international tourism and hospitality management departments under the School of Business Administration, and law department under the School of Law. Today, the total number of students of this university is around 4000.

Nazrul Islam, the present chairman of the Board of Trustees of Primeasia University, is the founder of PaU.

== Rankings ==
In 2017, the Dhaka Tribune ranked Primeasia University ninth among private universities in Bangladesh in terms of facilities and infrastructure. In terms of academic quality it placed 20th.

== Campus ==
Primeasia University is located in Banani, Dhaka, where it operates across several academic buildings.

The university has planned the development of a permanent campus in the Joar Sahara area near the 300-foot Purbachal Link Road. In January 2023, the University Grants Commission (UGC) announced that the university would not be permitted to admit new students until all academic activities were relocated to the permanent campus, citing non-compliance with the requirements of the Private University Act, 2010.

Later that year, the university announced in September 2023 that it had signed a construction agreement for the permanent campus. Student protests in December 2024 called for progress on the project, alleging that commitments regarding the relocation had not been fulfilled. In March 2025, bdnews24.com reported that construction had stalled amid allegations of financial irregularities surrounding the project and that the UGC had initiated an investigation.

== Academics ==
The university consists of 5 Faculties and 14 Departments.

1. School of Science & Engineering

- Bachelor of Science in Textile Engineering
- Bachelor of Computer Science & Engineering
- Bachelor of Science in Electrical and Electronics Engineering
- Bachelor of Architecture

2. School of Business

- Bachelor of Business Administration (BBA)
- Master of Business Administration (MBA)
- Bachelor of International Tourism & Hospitality Management

3. School of Science

- Bachelor of Microbiology
- Bachelor of Biochemistry & Molecular Biology
- Bachelor of Public Health Nutrition
- Bachelor of Pharmacy
- Master of Pharmacy

4. School of Law

- Bachelor of Laws

5. School of Arts

- Bachelor of English

=== Calendar ===
==== Four month semester ====
- Fall: January to April
- Spring: May to August
- Summer: September to December

==== Six month semester ====
The pharmacy department operates on an academic semester system.

- Spring: January to June
- Fall: July to December

== Administration ==
Vice-Chancellors

- Prof. Dr. ANM Meshquat Uddin
- Abdul Hannan Chowdhury
- Mesbah Kamal
- Iffat Jahan
- Suvamoy Datta (routine duties)

Pro-vice-chancellors

- Prof. Dr. Rayhana Begum (acting)

Treasurers

- Md. Kamal Hosen Howlader (acting)

Registrars

- Md. Sultan Shahriar, MBA, PGDHRM (Acting)

Chief Advisor

- Jobair Ahmad

=== List of Board of Trustees ===
- Md. Nazrul Islam- Chairman
- K. M. Khaled - Vice Chairman

=== List of Board Members ===
- M. N. H. Bulu - Member
- Waheed Murad Jamil - Member
- Taslima Islam - Member
- Abdullah Jamil Matin - Member
- Waheed Mahmud Khaled - Member
- Md. Salim Mahmud - Member
- Dr. Fatema Raushan Jahan - Member
- Ms. Rabeya Begum - Member
- Md. Khurshid Nayeem - Member
- Manik Rahman - Member
