= Meril =

Bangladeshi brand of personal care products

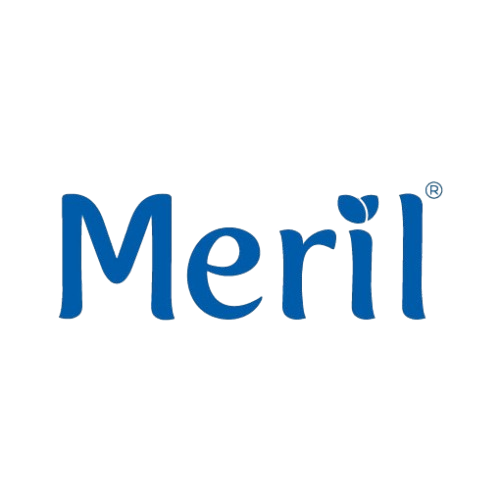
- Product type: Personal care
- Current owner: Square Toiletries, a subsidiary of Square Group
- Country: Bangladesh

Meril is a Bangladeshi brand of personal care products owned by the Bangladeshi consumer goods company Square Toiletries, which itself is a part of the Square Group conglomerate. The brand's product portfolio includes petroleum jelly, lip gel and lip balm, soaps, shampoos and conditioners, glycerin (as humectant), as well as personal care products for babies and infants, among others.

== History ==
The founder of Square Group, Samson H. Chowdhury, used to own a pharmacy which he founded in 1952, in the Ataikula village of Pabna District. Square Group was later founded in 1958 by Samson H. Chowdhury and his three friends as a pharmaceutical company, Square Pharmaceuticals, in Pabna.

Square Toiletries Limited, the parent company of Meril, was founded in 1988 as a division of Square Group and was made into a separate private limited company in 1994.

In the 1990s, Meril and Jai Jai Din, a Bangladeshi newspaper and magazine publication, used to organize the Jai Jai Din-Meril Award Ceremony. The show has now evolved into the Meril-Prothom Alo Awards.

In 2007, Meril introduced the Meril Splash lineup of soaps, which was aimed at Bangladeshi women. It has now been discontinued. Meril's current soap lineup includes the Meril Milk Soap Bar and Meril Vitamin C Care.

Later in 2009, Meril Revive was introduced, initially targeted at professional and working women. The Revive lineup went on to become an independent brand under Square Toiletries Limited, which now sells body lotions, sunscreens, micellar water, shampoos and talcum powders.

In early 2020s, Meril launched their Tangerine Orange shampoo and conditioner and Rain Shower Bath and Shower Gel (the latter of which is under the Meril brand according to Square Toiletries website).

== Sponsorship and campaigns ==
Meril has been co-hosting the Meril-Prothom Alo Awards since 1998 along with Prothom Alo. Since 2004, Meril Baby has also been hosting the ‘Meril Baby Adore Gora Bhobissot (Bengali: মেরিল বেইবি আদরে গড়া ভবিষ্যৎ) lit. 'Meril Baby - A future built with love', which have been providing “education insurance” to children.

In August 2014, Meril launched a campaign for their Meril Splash Beauty Soap with the message "fairness is not beauty, freshness is", tackling traditional beauty standards and norm of preferring people, especially women, with a fairer or lighter skin tone popularized by colonization and media portrayal alongside societal preference. This was a direct counter-campaign at western brands like Lux and Fair & Lovely, both of which run ad campaigns promoting fairness as beauty among women.

In 2025, Meril sponsored the Borno Mala cultural festival organized by Prothom Alo on the occasion of Language Movement Day to promote Bengali language among children.

== Products ==
These following products are listed in the Square Toiletries website under Meril branding as of November 2025:

- Meril Soap Bar
  - Milk Soap Bar (in Pure Milk, Rose, Kiwi and Beli variants)
  - Meril Vitamin C Care (in Tangerine Orange and Lemon & Lime variants)
- Shampoos and Conditioners
  - Tangerine Orange Shampoo
  - Tangerine Orange Conditioner
- Shower Gels
  - Rain Shower Refreshing Bath & Shower Gel
- Meril Protective Cares
  - Petroleum Jelly (in Pure & Cure, Lemon Fresh, Aloe Fresh and Cocoa Fresh variants)
  - Lip Balm or Chapstick (in Lemon, Strawberry and Pomegranate variants)
  - Lip Gel
  - Glycerin
  - Rosewater Glycerin
  - Olive Oil
- Meril Baby
  - Shampoo
  - Toothpaste (in Orange and Strawberry flavors)
  - Olive Oil
  - Soap bar
  - Powder
  - Toothbrush
  - Milk Cream
  - Shower Gel (in Orange variant)
