= American International University-Bangladesh =

Private University in Dhaka, Bangladesh

- আমেরিকান ইন্টারন্যাশনাল ইউনিভার্সিটি-বাংলাদেশ
- Seal of American International University-Bangladesh
- Other name: AIUB
- Former name: AMA International University-Bangladesh (1994-2001)
- Motto: Where leaders are created
- Type: Private research university
- Established: 1994; 32 years ago
- Accreditation: IEB; IAB; Bar Council; BAC; ACBSP; CHEA; ISO; AACSB; PAASCU; PCB; ACU
- Affiliations: University Grants Commission (UGC)
- Academic affiliations: ICAB; AUAP; IAUP; IAU; British Council; BCB; BFF
- Chancellor: President Mirza Fakhrul Islam Alamgir
- Vice-Chancellor: Saiful Islam
- Academic staff: 510+ Full-time doctorate: 121
- Administrative staff: 110+
- Total staff: 953 (full-time) as of 2021-2022
- Students: 13,515 as of 2024-25
- Location: 408/1 (Old KA 66/1), Kuratoli, Kuril, Khilkhet, Dhaka, 1229, Bangladesh; 23.822138°N 90.427406°E
- Campus: Urban, 12 acres (4.9 ha)
- Language: English
- Demonym: AIUBian
- Colors: Dark blue
- Website: aiub.edu

University rankings

Global – Overall
- QS World: 1401+ (2027)
- THE World: 800-1000 (2027)

Global – Science and engineering
- THE Computer Science: 801-1000 (2026)
- THE Engineering: 801-1000 (2026)

Regional – Overall
- QS Asia: 534 (2027)

American International University-Bangladesh (Note: Bengali: আমেরিকান ইন্টারন্যাশনাল ইউনিভার্সিটি-বাংলাদেশ, romanized: Āmērikāna inṭāran'yāśanāla i'unibhārsiṭi-bānlādēśa) commonly known by its acronym AIUB, is a private research university in Dhaka, Bangladesh. This university was established in 1994. It offers several degree programs at the undergraduate and graduate levels from its five faculties.

== History ==
The university was established in 1994 in Dhaka, Bangladesh as AMA International University Bangladesh, a joint venture between AMA Computer University of the Philippines, and local initiator Anwarul Abedin. First campus of this university was in Mohakhali, then it shifted to Banani. Regular academic classes started in 1995. AMA Computer University later left the partnership, and in 2001 the university was renamed American International University-Bangladesh. In 2017, AIUB moved to its permanent campus at Kuratoli Road, Kuril, Khilkhet, Dhaka. As the university grew, it increased the number of programs and introduced master's degrees.

== Campus ==
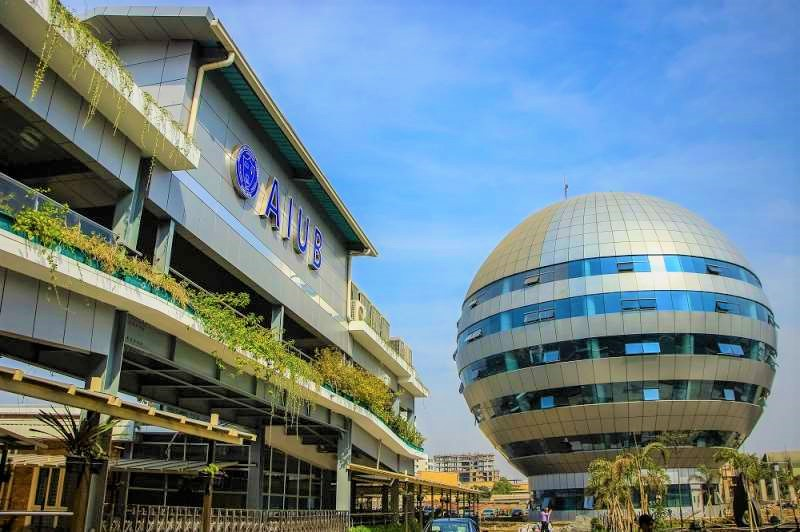
One side of AIUB Campus

The university's campus is located in an urban setting at Kuratoli, Kuril in Dhaka (Beside Bashundhara). The campus area is about 12 acres (4.9 ha). There is a total building area of 1,300,000 square feet (120,000 m^{2}). The university campus is known for having a glass-covered central globe structured building.

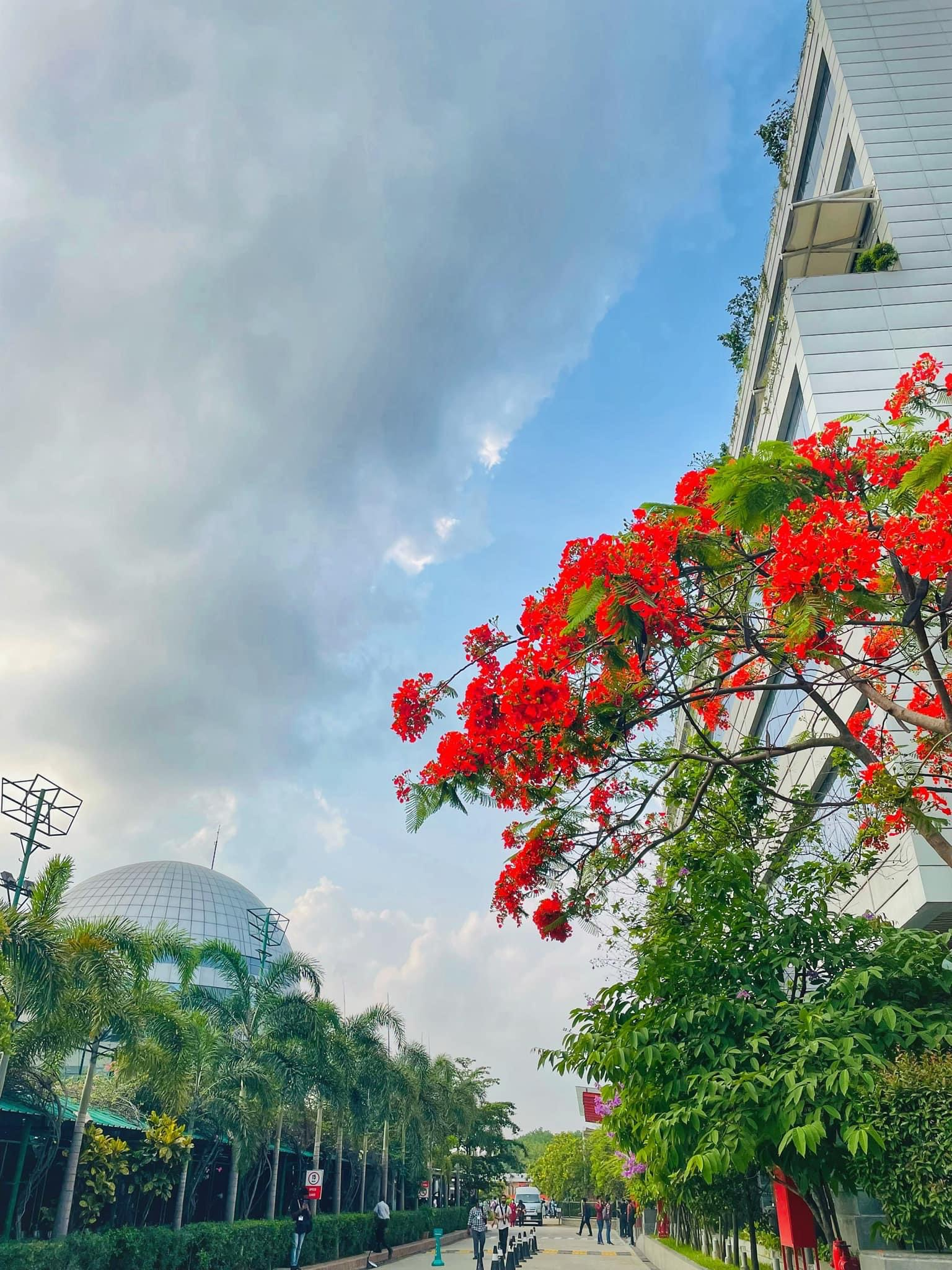
In front road of AIUB D Building

== Admission ==
Each applicant has to pass the competitive admission test administered by the university. In the admission test, university judges applicant for their knowledge of math, English and other subjects. There are two parts of admission exam written and viva. Student have to pass both individually. Admission Procedure for International Students requires TOEFL/IELTS/GRE/GMAT/SAT scores (as applicable) for all applicants, except those from countries where English is the only official language, as evidence of adequate proficiency in English. The minimum acceptable score for TOEFL and GMAT/GRE is 550 and for SAT it is 1650.

== Academics ==
The medium of instruction of all academic programs at AIUB is English. The academic year of the university incorporates three regular semesters. The Summer semester is an optional summer semester at AIUB. The duration of each regular semester is 17 weeks and 12 weeks for the optional summer semester. Now all the semester’s are regular. The academic year starts from Fall semester.

The academic programs are divided among the Faculty of Arts and Social Sciences, Faculty of Business Administration, Faculty of Engineering, Faculty of Science and Technology and Faculty of Health and Life Sciences. All the faculties offer both undergraduate and graduate level studies. AIUB is the official education partner of Bangladesh Cricket Board and Bangladesh Football Federation.

AIUB updated its grading system in February 2017 for the second time. The New Grading System will be applicable for those students who have enrolled in Spring 2016-17 and later. Old Grading system will still be applicable for students who have enrolled in Fall 2016-17 and before. The letter grades indicating the quality of course work completed with their corresponding grade points. Minimum CGPA requirement for graduation in any undergraduate and graduate program at AIUB is 2.50. The scholarship program at AIUB is open for both incoming and continuing students with at least one year of residency. It covers full or partial tuition fee waiver. Incoming students qualify by passing the competitive examinations while weighted average CGPA for the previous year of 3.75 with no grade lower than B and no F, I, W, UW grades no disciplinary records. The number of awards is dependent on the slots available. AIUB authority also provide financial aids for deserving students. AIUB also offers 100% scholarship for only the son and daughter of Freedom Fighter (they should maintain CGPA 3.50).

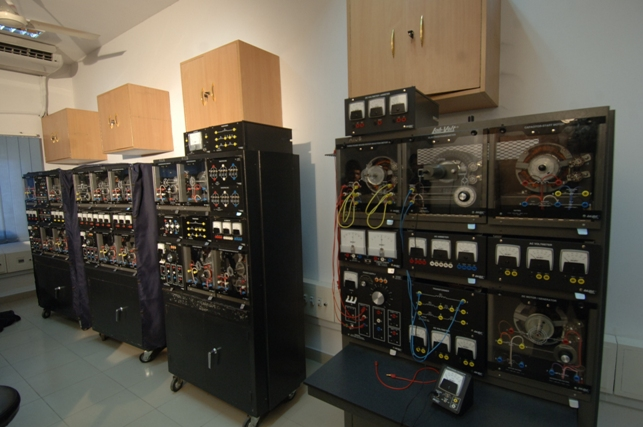
Electrical Machine Lab 1 of AIUB

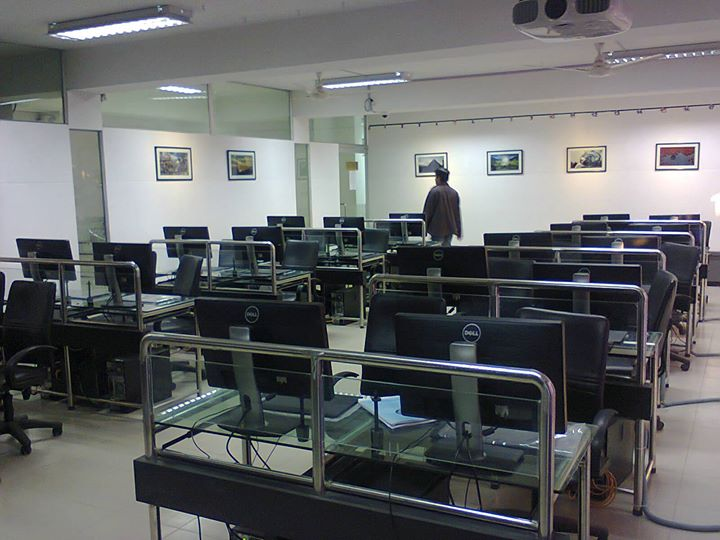
AIUB Animation Lab

=== Faculties and programs ===
- Faculty of Arts and Social Sciences (FASS).
- Faculty of Business Administration (FBA).
- Faculty of Engineering (FE).
- Faculty of Health and Life Sciences (FHLS).
- Faculty of Science and Technology (FST).

== Convocations ==
The first convocation of the university was held in 1999 at Pan Pacific Sonargaon. Since then, convocations have been held each year from 2002 to 2018, then in 2020, 2021, 2023, and twice in 2025. The upcoming 24th convocation will be held on 12 December 2026. Starting in 2018, the university's convocation was held at its permanent campus. As of 2025, a total of 41,226 graduates had graduated from the university in 23 convocations.

== Research and publications ==
In the research arena, AIUB has internal academic journals: AIUB Journal of Science and Engineering (AJSE) (ISSN 1608-3679) and AIUB Journal of Business and Economics (AJBE), (ISSN 1683-8742). Since the first publication in 2002, three issues per year have been published regularly. AJSE is now a formally Scopus indexed journal, and Scimago Ranked Q3 Journal. In 2026, the Faculty of Arts and Social Sciences has introduced a new international peer-reviewed journal named AIUB Journal of Arts and Social Sciences (AJASS), (ISSN 3137-1817). AIUB is also the first institute in Bangladesh to launch an online working paper series named AIUB Bus Econ Working Paper Series, which collaborated with the RePEc and EconPapers.

== Extracurricular activities ==
AIUB is one of the only eight universities from Bangladesh who have participated in the maximum level of ACM International Collegiate Programming Contest (ACM ICPC) commonly known as ACM ICPC World Final. In 2001, AIUB qualified for the world final through Wild Card by securing second place in ACM ICPC Kanpur Site regional. The Office of Student Affairs (OSA) looks after the extra curricular activities of the student community through many student organizations and clubs.

== Notable alumni ==
=== Academia ===
- Mohammad Shihabul Haque, former senior scientist at Agency for Science Technology and Research, Singapore

=== Engineering and IT ===
- Zaheed Sabur, senior director and distinguished engineer, Google (Note: Multiple references:)

=== Military ===
- General Aziz Ahmed, former Chief of Army Staff
- Abul Hossain, retired lieutenant general, Bangladesh Army
- Mizanur Rahman Shamim, retired lieutenant general and former Principal Staff Officer Armed Forces Division

=== Literature, media and entertainment ===
- Tasnova Hoque Elvin, actress and model
- Safa Kabir, actress and model
- Tawsif Mahbub, actor and model
- Sabila Nur, actress and model
- Minar Rahman, singer, songwriter and cartoonist

=== Sports ===
- Taskin Ahmed, cricketer, Bangladesh National Cricket Team
- Sanjida Akhter, footballer, Bangladesh Nation Women's Football Team
- Krishna Rani Sarkar, footballer, Bangladesh Nation Women's Football Team
- Monika Chakma, footballer, Bangladesh Nation Women's Football Team
- Shakib Al Hasan, cricketer, former captain of the Bangladesh National Cricket Team and former Member of Parliament
- Akbar Ali, cricketer, Bangladesh National Cricket Team
- Anamul Haque Bijoy, cricketer, Bangladesh National Cricket Team
- Liton Das, cricketer, Bangladesh National Cricket Team
- Tanzid Hasan, cricketer, Bangladesh National Cricket Team
- Sharfuddoula, international cricket umpire
- Abu Hider, cricketer, Bangladesh National Cricket Team
- Afif Hossain, cricketer, Bangladesh National Cricket Team
- Aminul Islam, cricketer, Bangladesh National Cricket Team
- Shoriful Islam, cricketer, Bangladesh National Cricket Team
- Shathira Jakir, former cricketer and international cricket umpire
- Mahmudullah, cricketer and former captain of the Bangladesh National Cricket Team
- Kamrul Islam Rabbi, cricketer, Bangladesh National Cricket Team
- Sabbir Rahman, cricketer, Bangladesh National Cricket Team
- Munim Shahriar, cricketer, Bangladesh National Cricket Team

== Notable faculty members ==
- Saiful Islam, academic and vice-chancellor
- Ahmad Kaikaus, former principal secretary of the Prime minister of Bangladesh
- Aupee Karim, actress and architect
- Carmen Zita Lamagna, academic and former vice-chancellor
- Pinaki Bhattacharya, physician and activist
- AK Abdul Momen, former foreign minister of Bangladesh

== Gallery ==
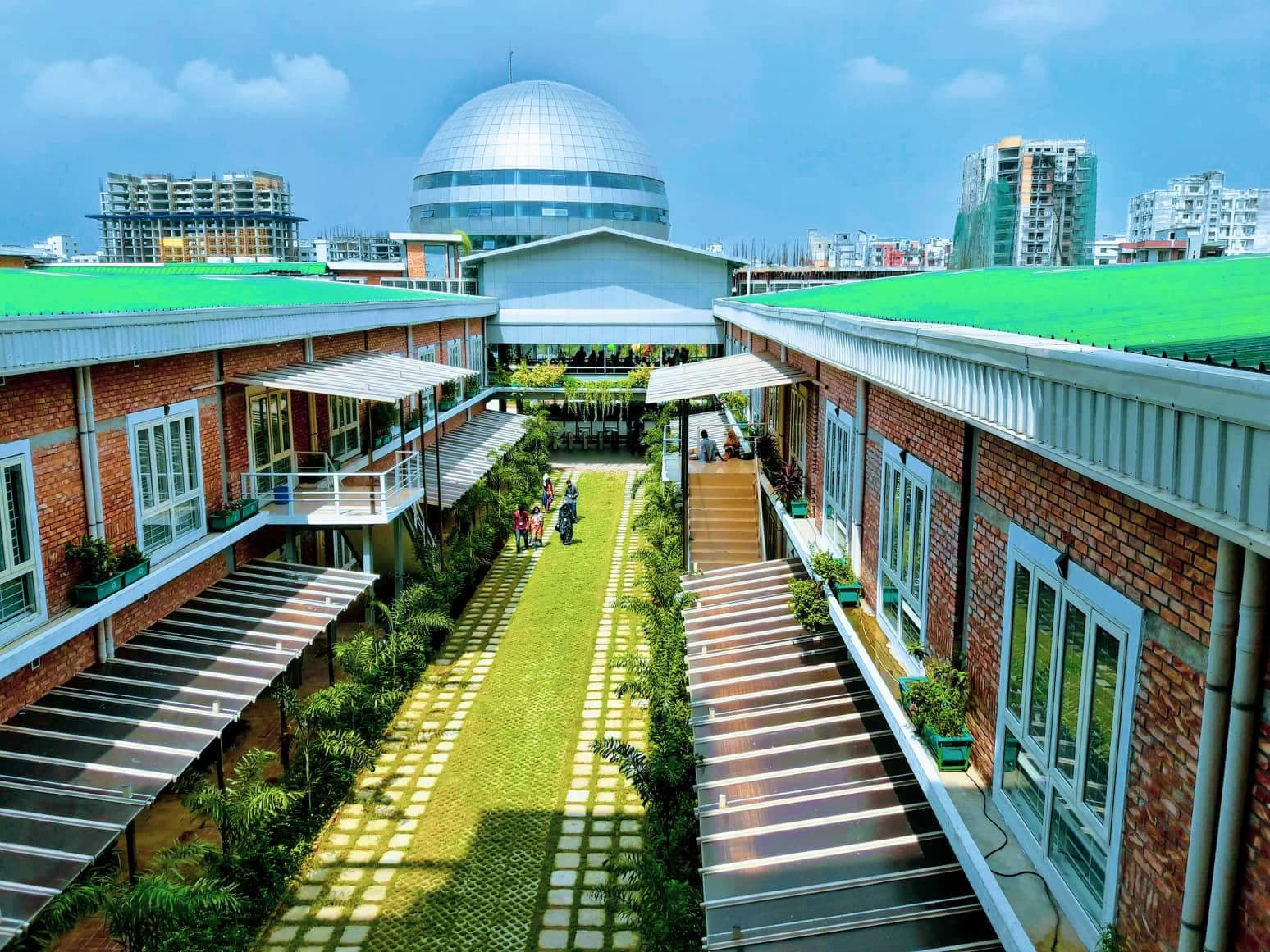
Temporary annex building

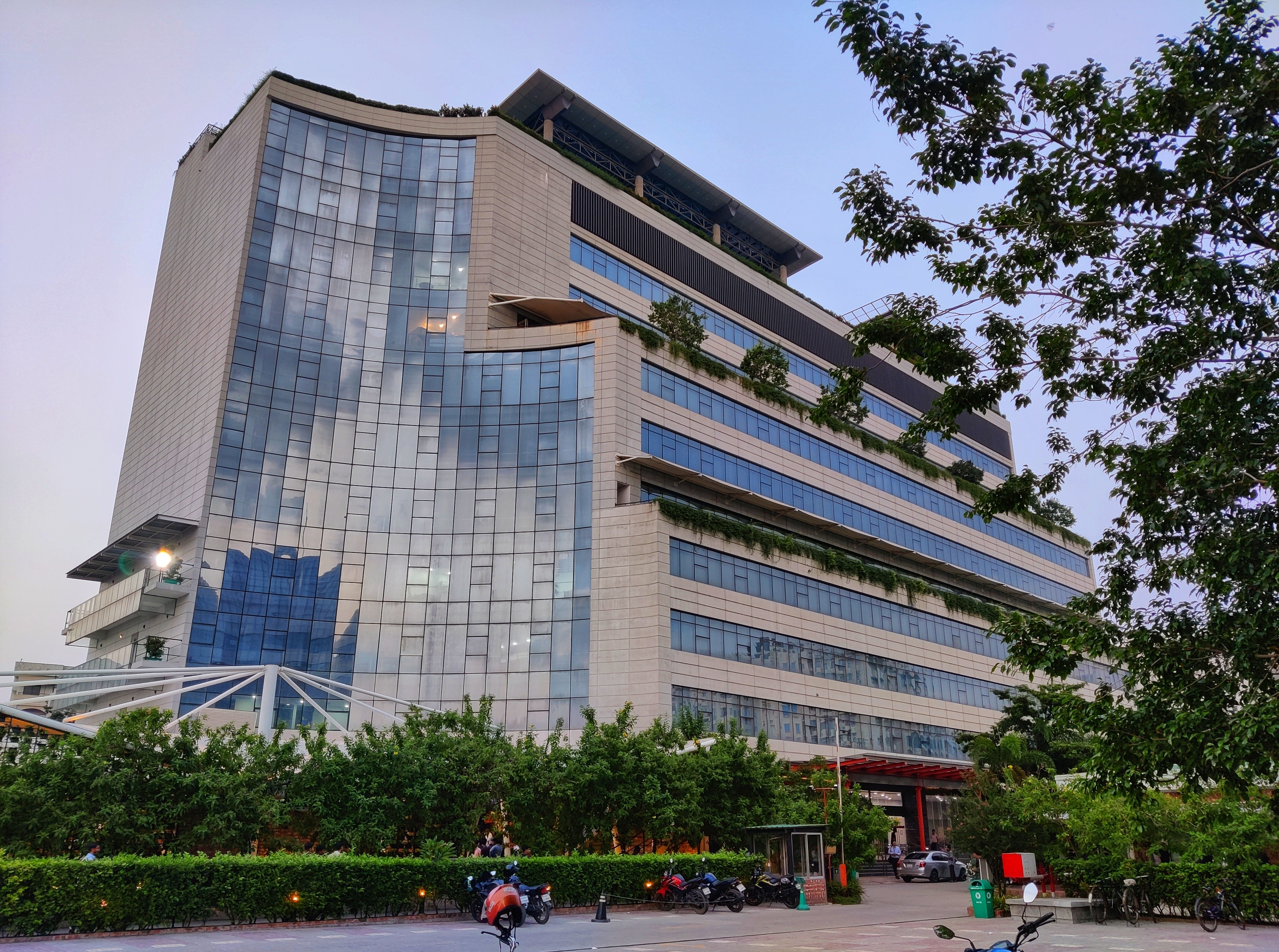
AIUB D building

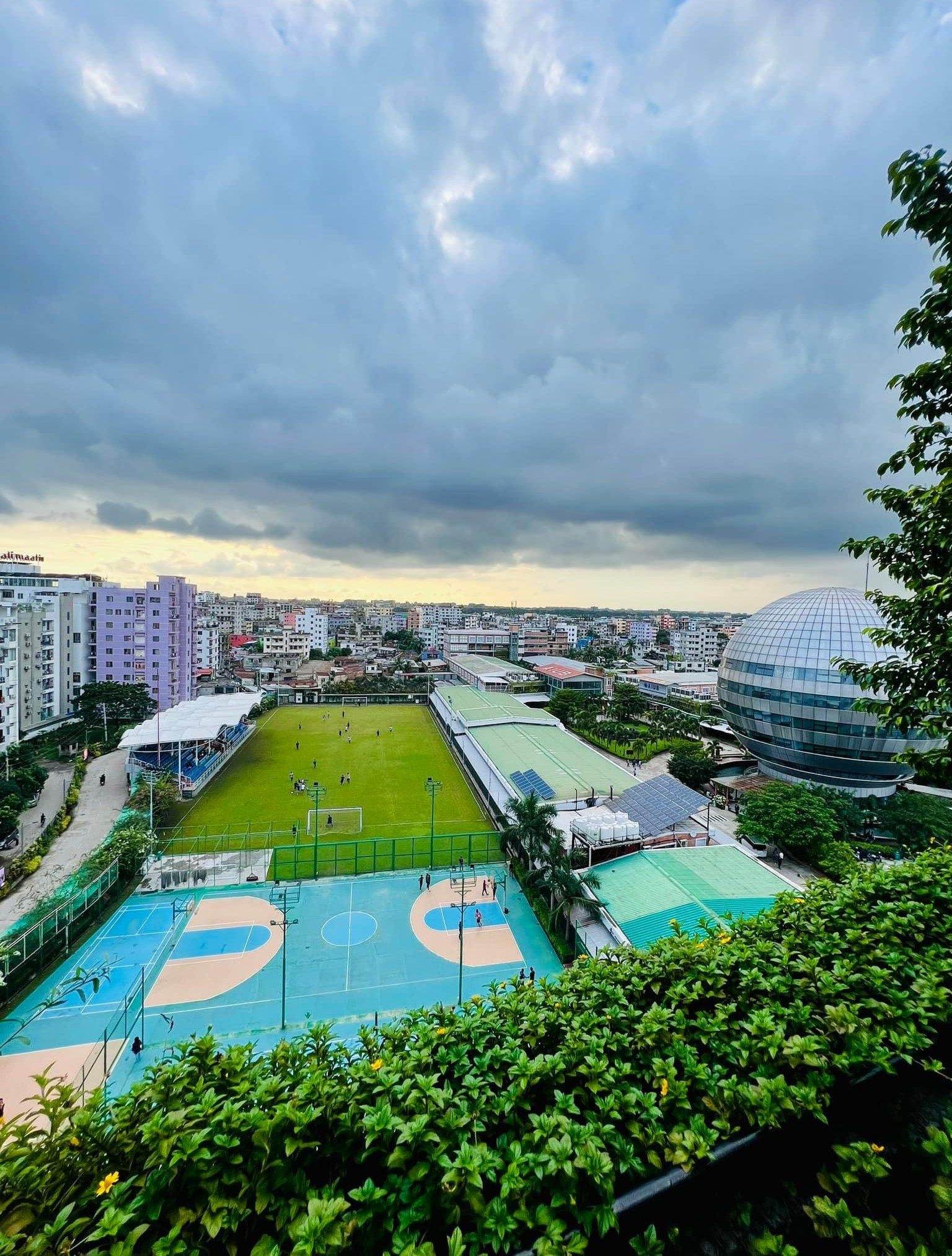
AIUB playgrounds

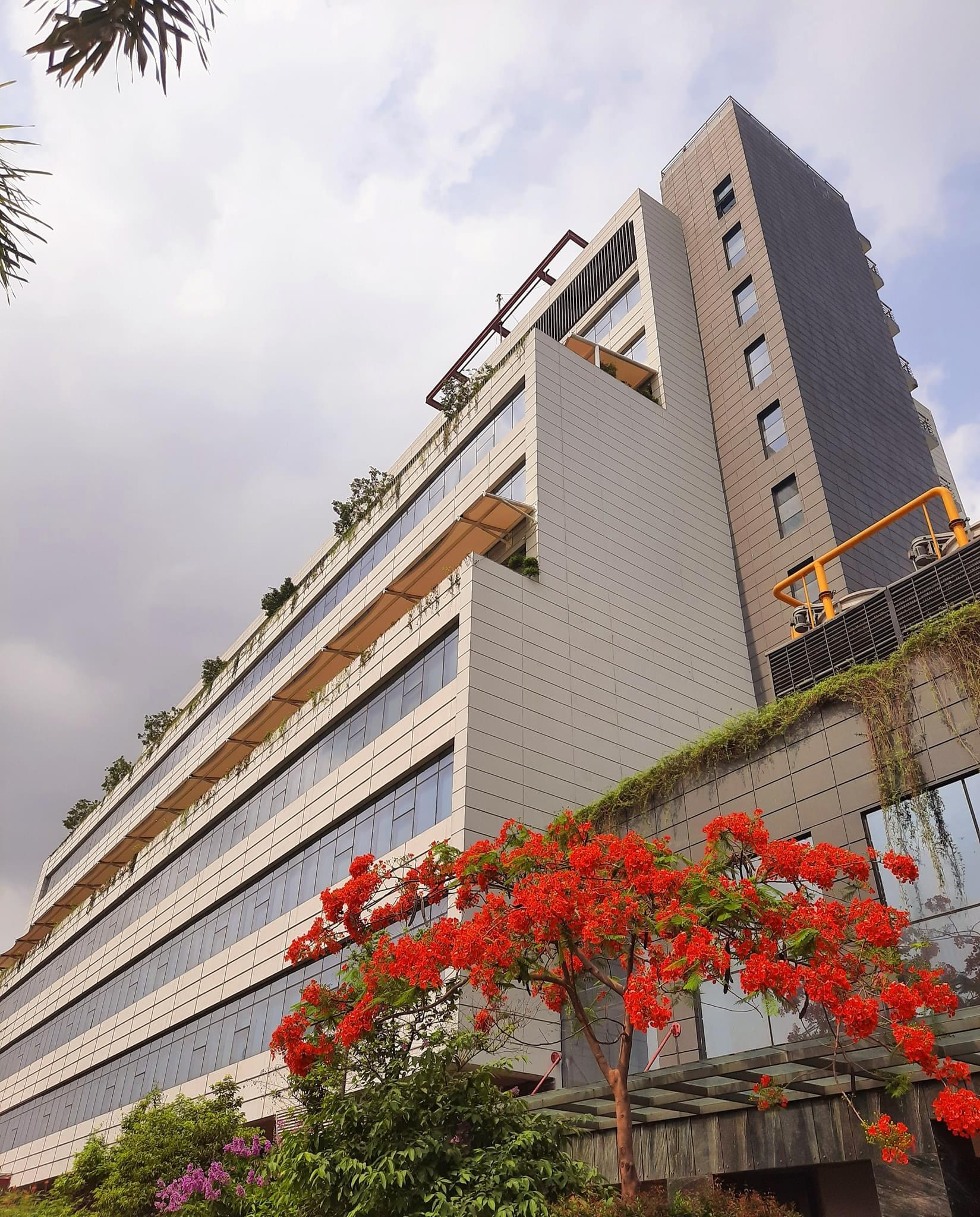
One side of AIUB D Building
