= Square Group =

Bangladeshi Conglomerate

- A Seal of Square Group
- Formation: 1958
- Founder: Samson H. Chowdhury
- Headquarters: Dhaka, Bangladesh
- Region served: Bangladesh
- Official language: Bengali
- Key people: Anjan Chowdhury
- Subsidiaries: Square Pharmaceuticals; Maasranga Television; Square Hospital; Square Textile Limited; Square Fashions Limited; Square Food and Beverage; Square Toiletries Limited; Mediacom Limited; Dmoney; AEGIS Services Limited
- Revenue: 1.5 billion $
- Staff: 80,000 (2025)
- Website: www.squaregroup.com

Square Group (Bengali: স্কয়ার গ্রুপ) is a Bangladeshi diversified multinantional conglomerate based in Dhaka. Samuel S Chowdhury is the chairman and Tapan Chowdhury is managing director of Square Group. Square Group has 80,000 employees.

== History ==
Square Group was founded in 1958 by Samson H. Chowdhury and his three friends as a pharmaceutical company, Square Pharmaceuticals in Pabna. Samson H Chowdhury used to own a pharmacy, founded in 1952, in the Ataikula village in Pabna District.

In 1974, Square Pharmaceuticals worked with Janssen Pharmaceutica, a subsidiary of Johnson & Johnson.

In 1987, the group started exporting pharmaceuticals from Bangladesh.

Square Group launched Senora in 1989, which was the first Sanitary napkin manufactured in Bangladesh.

In 1994, Square Toiletries Limited became a private limited company.

Square Textiles Limited was established in 1997.

Square established a pharmaceutical factory under the supervision of Bovis Lend Lease in 2001.

In 2002, Square Textiles Limited was listed on the Dhaka Stock Exchange.

Square Group founded Square Hospital on 16 December 2006 in Dhaka. Joe Davis-Fleming was appointed the first CEO of the hospital. The 250 bed hospital was built on a 3.5 billion taka budget.

Square Group started exporting food products to Japan through Square Consumer Products Limited in 2008.

On 9 March 2012, the board of directors of Square Group appointed Samuel S Chowdhury Chairperson of the group. Mikhail Myasnikovich, Prime Minister of Belarus visited Square Pharmaceuticals factory in Gazipur District and signed a MOU to import pharmaceutical products.

On 9 April 2015, Square Textiles announced plans to invest 1.13 billion taka to expand production facilities. Square Toiletries started the manufacturing of diapers in 2015.

On 26 August 2016, Square Denim started operations from Habiganj District.

On 10 January 2018, Square pharmaceutical started construction of a pharmaceutical factory in Nairobi, Kenya through its subsidiary Square Pharmaceuticals Kenya EPZ Ltd. Production at the factory was delayed by the COVID-19 pandemic.

Square Group launched a helicopter service called Square Air Limited in 2019. It operates three helicopters and clientele includes government ministers and high-ranking officials visiting projects outside of Dhaka.

Square Group received permission to export pharmaceuticals to Democratic Republic of the Congo on 10 March 2020. Square Group donated 10,000 sets of personal protective equipment to the Directorate General of Drug Administration in March 2020 during the COVID-19 pandemic in Bangladesh. On 26 October 2020, Square announced plans to invest 2.5 billion taka to expand pharmaceutical production.

== Subsidiaries ==
There are currently 13 subsidiaries.

- Aegis Services
- Maasranga Television
- Mediacom
- Sabazpur Tea Company
- Square Apparels
- Square Denims Limited
- Square Fashions
- Square Food & Beverage
  - Radhuni
- Square Hospitals
- Square Informatix
- Square Pharmaceuticals
- Square Textiles
- Square Toiletries
  - Mayalogy

== See also ==
- Bombay Sweets
