= Desh Group =

Bangladeshi diversified conglomerate

- Formation: 1974
- Headquarters: Dhaka, Bangladesh
- Region served: Bangladesh
- Official language: Bengali
- Website: deshgroup.com

Desh Group (Bengali: দেশ গ্রুপ) is a Bangladeshi diversified conglomerate based in Dhaka. Rokeya Quader is the chairperson of Desh Group and Omar Quader Khan is the managing director. Vidiya Amrit Khan is the Group director. it was a pioneer of the garments industry in Bangladesh.

== History ==
Desh Group was established in 1974 by M. Noorul Quader. Desh International Limited was founded in 1974 as an importer of electric diesel locomotives. Tutelar Oil Services was established in 1974 as an importer of factory machinery.

Desh Garments was established in 1977 as an export oriented garment factory. It was the first export oriented garment factory in Bangladesh and a pioneer of the Textile industry in Bangladesh. The factory sent staff to South Korea to learn about the garments trade from Daewoo in the early 1980s.

Desh Agencies Limited was established in 1978 as a clearing and forwarding agency.

Desh Real Estate Limited was established in 1980 as an industrial land developer near Dhaka and Chittagong.

Jenk Industries Limited was established in 1988 as a manufacturer of cardboard boxes.

In 2008, Vidiya Amrit Khan, daughter of M. Noorul Quader took charge of Desh Garments in Chittagong. She hired a consultant from Germany and modernized the factory.

== Businesses ==
- Desh Garments
- Desh International Limited
- Tutelar Oil Services
- Jenk Industries Limited
- Desh Agencies Limited
- Desh Real Estate Limited

== See also ==
- Bombay Sweets
