= Anjan Chowdhury =

Bangladeshi industrialist

- অঞ্জন চৌধুরী
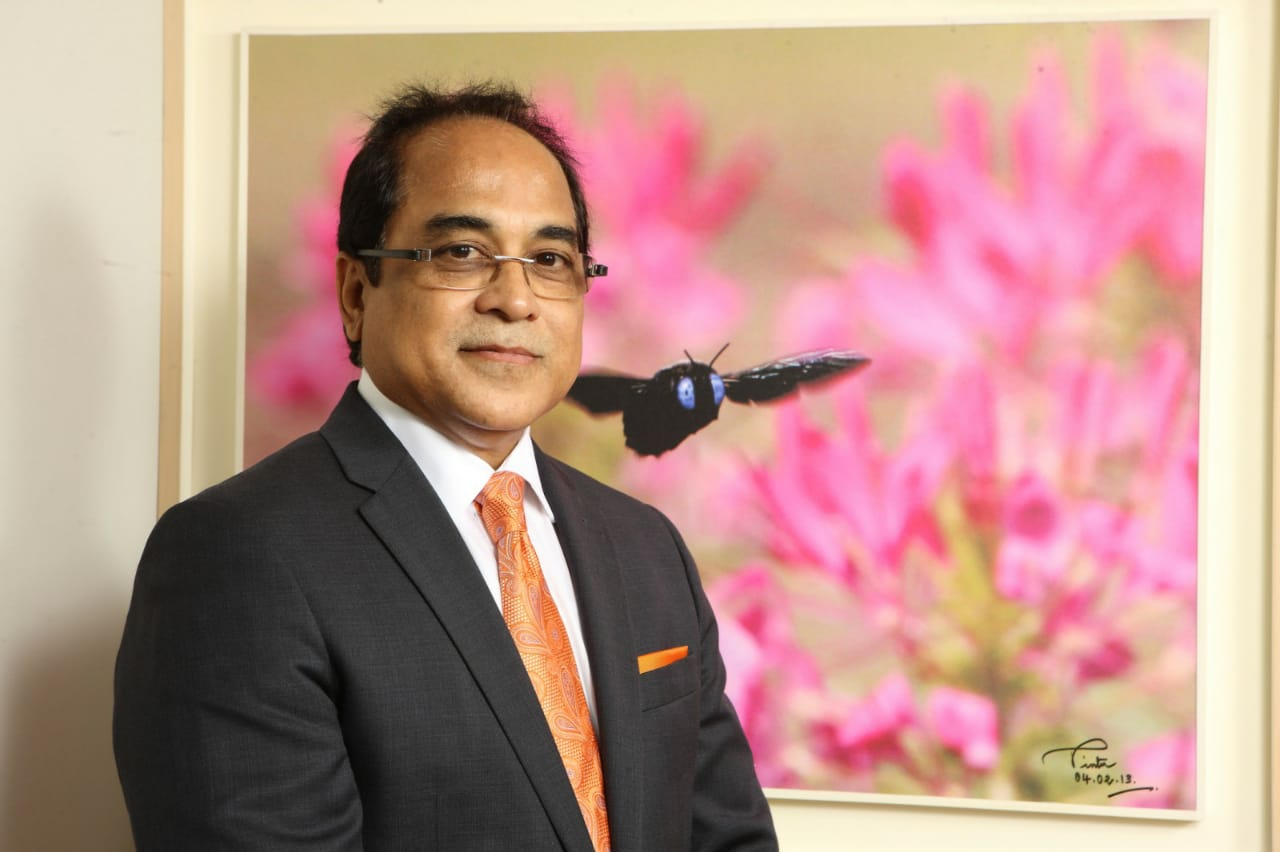
- Born: 17 July 1954 (age 72); Dhaka, Bangladesh
- Occupation: Entrepreneur
- Years active: 1991–present
- Children: 3 Daughters & 1 Son
- Father: Samson H. Chowdhury
- Relatives: Tapan Chowdhury (brother)

Anjan Chowdhury (Bengali: অঞ্জন চৌধুরী; born 17 July 1954) is a Bangladeshi industrialist. One of the main stakeholders of Square Group, a Bangladeshi business conglomerate engaged in pharmaceuticals, textiles, toiletries & cosmetics, food & beverage, security services, information technology, healthcare, aviation, banking and television broadcasting, he was recognized by the Government of Bangladesh as a Commercially Important Person (CIP) for his continuous contribution to the economic development of the country in different years since 2005 and acclaimed as one of the highest taxpayer since 2008.

== Biography ==
Anjan Chowdhury was born on 17 July 1954 as the youngest child of Late Samson H. Chowdhury, the founder of Square Group. He completed his studies from University of South Florida in Management.

He actively participated in The Liberation War of Bangladesh in 1971 as a Freedom Fighter; he was a member of Bangladesh Liberation Force(BLF). He was one of approximately 13,000 trained as commando at the Chakrata, Dehradun cantonment in India during the Bangladesh liberation war.

== Career ==
He has been involved with several ventures under the Square Group umbrella, including Maasranga Television, Square Toiletries Limited, Square Food & Beverages Limited, Square Air Limited, and Mediacom Limited. Over the years, he expanded his business with different ventures known as Sun Communication Limited, VISION Technologies Limited, SUN Technologies Limited, Oracle Travels, Aegis Services Limited and Sun Distribution.

== Associations ==
Anjan Chowdhury is a Trustee Member of the Education, Science, Technology and Cultural Development Trust (ESTCDT) of Independent University, Bangladesh. He is the Chairman of Society for the Promotion of Bangladesh Art (SPBA) and President of Annoda Gobinda Public Library, Pabna. He is the Vice President of Bangladesh Olympic Association (BOA) and is a Councilor of Bangladesh Football Federation (BFF). He is a member of the Kurmitola Golf Club (KGC) Executive Board.

He served as vice president previously and councilor of Bangladesh Cricket Board, and director of Abahani Limited Dhaka.

He is the President of AOAB (Aviation Operators Association of Bangladesh). He is the President of ATCO (Association of Television Channel Owners). He is the Chairman of Micro Industries Development Assistance and Services (MIDAS) and Dmoney. He is also the Chairman of Sun Foundation and Sun Communications Ltd.

He was the former president of BAPA (Bangladesh Agro Processors Association) and Bangladesh Toiletries and Cosmetic Association.

== Contributions in sports, culture and education ==
=== Sports ===
Chowdhury is associated with various sports councils, associations, clubs, etc. and is a lifetime member of the Bangladesh Sports Press Association (BSPA). He was a member of the Pabna District Sports Association' executive committee and still conducts their events as a consultant. He has been awarded the National Sports Awards 2009 by The Ministry of Youth & Sports, Government of the People's Republic of Bangladesh. He is the founding chairman of Pabna Pirates FC (Football Club) and Pabna Pirates CC (Cricket Club). He was the former president of Pabna Press Club. He also served as the vice-president of the Bangladesh Football Federation (BFF).

=== Film ===
He won the 34th National Film Awards (Bangladesh) as Best Producer in the year 2011 by the Ministry of Culture, Government of the People's Republic of Bangladesh for the feature film "Monpura." He repeated his success at the 45th National Film Award for the film "Bishwoshundori" released in 2020 under his production company Sun Music and Motion Pictures Ltd. He won the Best Producer award along with awards in 7 more categories.

In 2022, He produced mystery-drama Hawa under Sun Music and Motion Pictures Ltd. Hawa is hugely acclaimed both critically and commercially. Than he produced musical romantic film Rockstar in 2026 with Shakib Khan, which received widely mixed reviews.

=== Education ===
He is one of the founders of the Dishari Computer Training Institute that engages the poor and meritorious students in the development of skills. He contributed to the renovation of the Public Library of Annoda Gobinda and Bonomali Shilpakala Kendra. He initiated and contributed to the founding of ASTRAS, Poura Prathomik Biddaloy, Square Kindergarten, Square High School & College and several other organizations , he is also involved in projects specifically focused on sustainable economy and educational development for the underprivileged.

=== Music ===
He has organized an international folk music platform called "Dhaka International Folk Fest" since 2015 and “Magic Bauliana”, a talent show aimed at finding new talents in folk music.

=== Women empowerment ===
He is a member of the WINGs (women in need group) advisory board. In cooperation with the Dutch Government and SNV Netherlands Development Organisation, he had helped female RMG workers in Bangladesh to ensure their sexual and reproductive health and rights (SRHR). He is a current member of American Embassy Employees’ Association, Dhaka.

=== Food industry ===
To promote Bangladeshi cuisine and give local cooks a head-start in the food industry, he has initiated reality show “Shera Radhuni” which highlights the rich history and techniques of Bangladeshi recipes.

== Dhaka International Folk Fest ==
Dhaka International Folk Fest is a music celebration where numerous folk artists from home and abroad perform on a single stage. It is a popular three-day folk music celebration. This show is on a journey to promote folk music globally and to introduce the world of folk music to the Bangladeshi people.
