= Square Hospital =

Private hospital in Dhaka, Bangladesh

Coordinates: 23.7528°N 90.3816°E

- Square Group
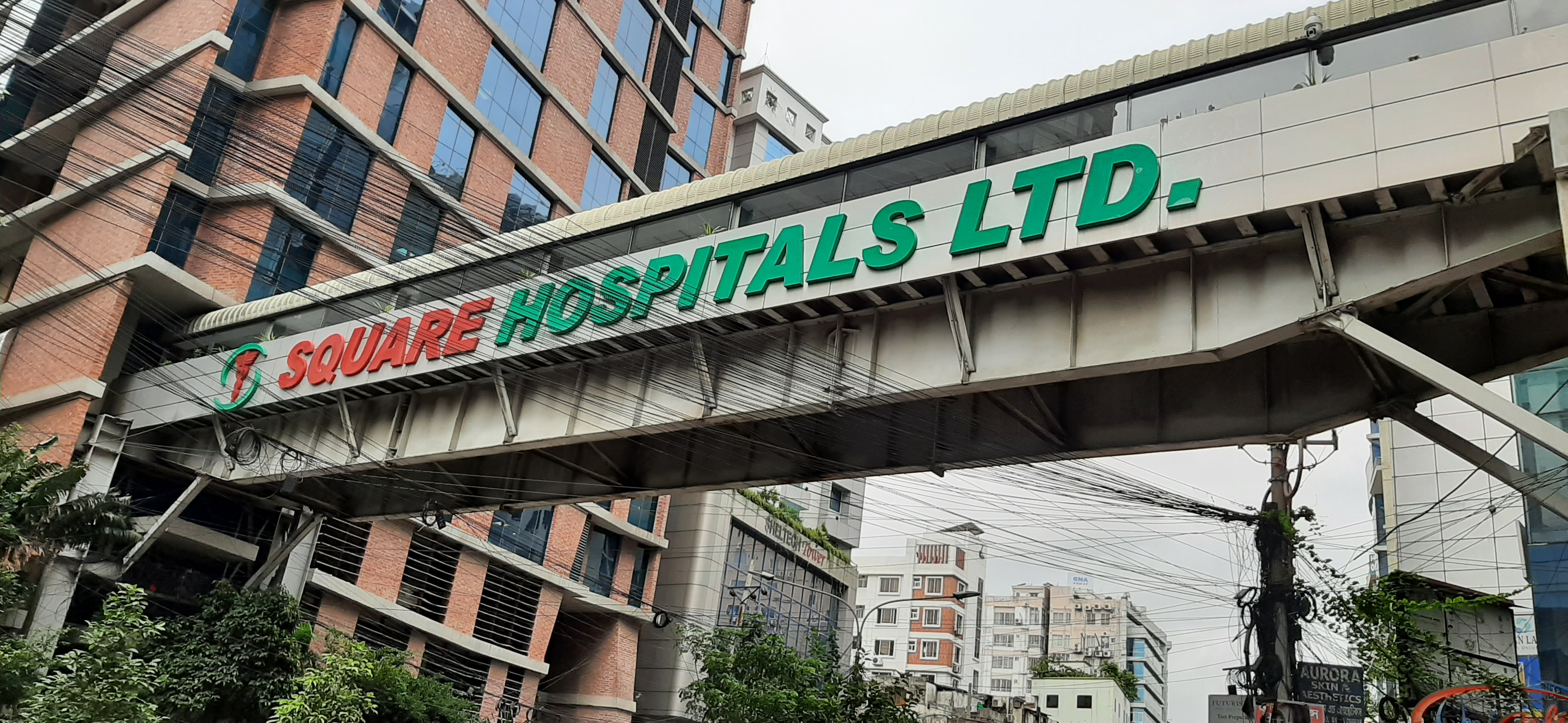

Geography
- Location: 18/F, Bir Uttam Qazi Nuruzzaman Sarak, West Panthapath, Dhaka 1205, Bangladesh

Organisation
- Type: Private Hospital

History
- Opened: 2006

Links
- Website: www.squarehospital.com

Square Hospital is a private hospital in Dhaka, Bangladesh. It is one of three high-end private hospitals in Bangladesh, the other being Evercare Hospital Dhaka and Continental Hospital. Tapan Chowdhury is the managing director of the hospital.

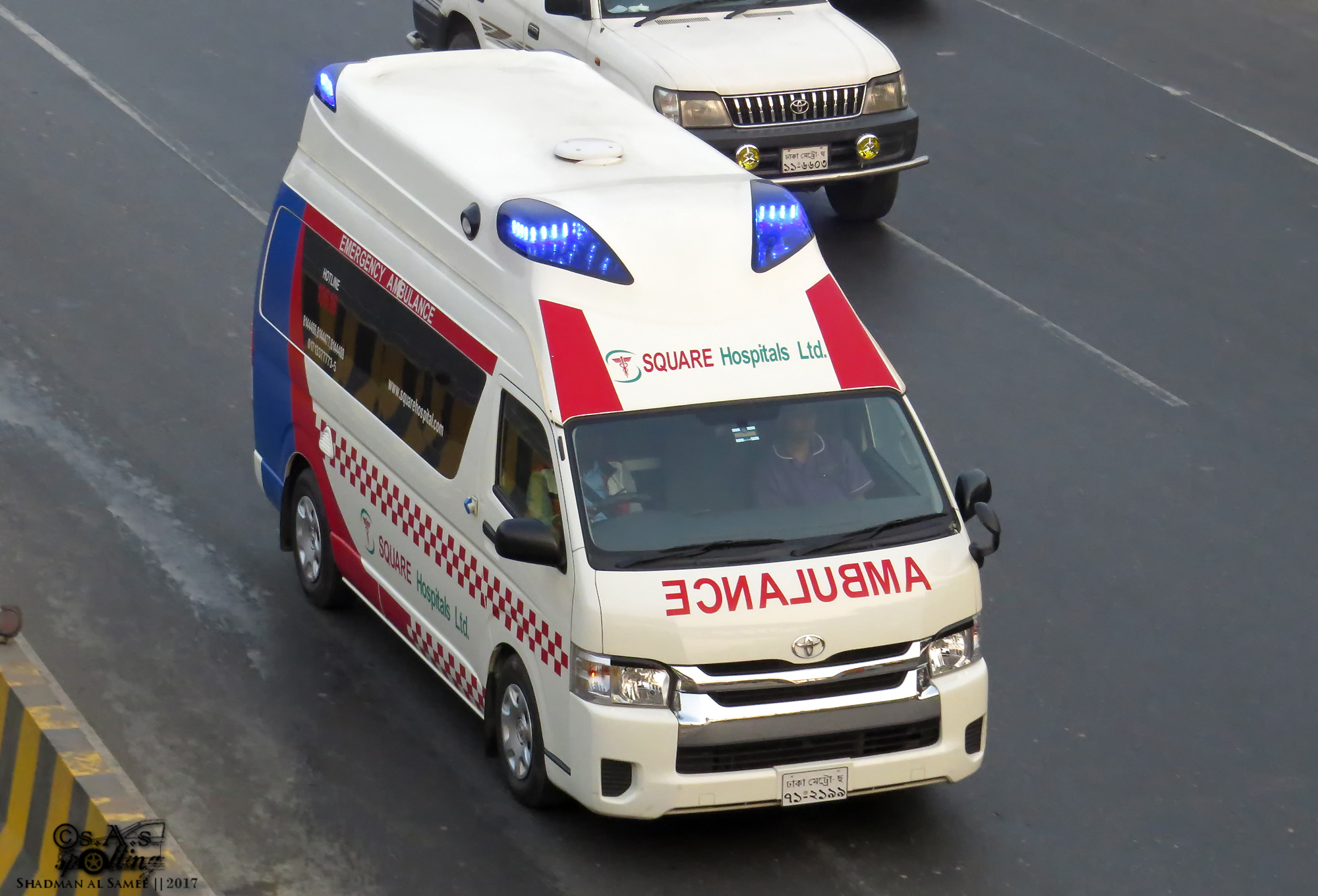
Square Hospital Ambulance

== History ==
Square Hospital was founded on 16 December 2006 by Samson H. Chowdhury of Square Group. It was a 300- (now 500) bed hospital. It was founded in partnership with Methodist Le Bonheur Healthcare, Memphis, Care IVF Centre of Singapore, and Christian Medical College & Hospital, Vellore. It is also partnered with Raffles Hospital.

In 2008, former Prime Minister Sheikh Hasina received medical treatment at Square Hospital while she was detained by the caretaker government. On 11 January 2012, the hospital was fined by the Department of Environment over noise pollution from its generators.
