= Tapan Chowdhury =

Tapan Chowdhury may refer to:

- Tapan Chowdhury (businessman)
- Tapan Chowdhury (singer)
