= Khaleda Ekram =

Bangladeshi academic (1950–2016)

12th Vice-Chancellor of Bangladesh University of Engineering and Technology
- In office 14 September 2014 – 24 May 2016
- Preceded by: S. M. Nazrul Islam
- Succeeded by: Saiful Islam

Personal details
- Born: 6 August 1950 Dhaka, East Bengal, Dominion of Pakistan
- Died: 24 May 2016 (aged 65) Bangkok, Thailand
- Resting place: Banani Graveyard, Dhaka, Bangladesh
- Education: MURP
- Alma mater: Bangladesh University of Engineering and Technology; University of Hawaii; Lund University
- Occupation: Academic
- Awards: See full list

Khaleda Ekram (6 August 1950 – 24 May 2016) was a Bangladeshi architect, professor, researcher, and academic. She served as the 12th vice-chancellor of Bangladesh University of Engineering and Technology (BUET). She was the former dean of the faculty of architecture and planning and head of the department of architecture at BUET. She was the first woman to be appointed as the vice-chancellor of BUET. She held the position from September 2014 until her death in May 2016.

Ekram was awarded 2023 Begum Rokeya Padak posthumously for her contribution to women's education

== Early life and education ==
Ekram was born on 6 August 1950, in Dhaka, to Ekram Hussain and Qamrunnessa Hussain. She had three sisters, Kamela Akhter Ishaque, Morsheda Karim, and Masuda Ahmed.

Ekram received her Bachelor of Architecture degree from Bangladesh University of Engineering and Technology in 1974. Her final year thesis project was titled "Tourist Resort at Cox's Bazaar, Chittagong". She pursued higher education in urban planning and design in the United States, where she earned her graduate degree (MURP) from the University of Hawaii in 1980. Her thesis title was "Revitalization of Residential Areas of Old Dhaka". In 1992, she completed post-graduate courses in architecture and development at Lund University in Sweden.

== Career ==
Ekram began her career in 1974 as a junior architect at Bastukalabid Limited in Dhaka. She also worked for Parikalpak Sangstha Limited, for a brief period in 1975. In the same year, she began her four-decade-long teaching career with the Department of Architecture of BUET. She first joined as a lecturer and then became assistant professor in 1977. Her areas of interest included housing, community development, urban design, urban planning and gender issues.

After graduating from the University of Hawaii in Urban and Regional Planning, she worked as assistant architect planner at Honolulu-based Michael T. Suzuki & Associates, from December 1980 to May 1981. She also worked at East West Center and contributed to community service projects in Honolulu.

Upon coming back to Bangladesh, she resumed her assistant professor role in BUET and became associate professor in 1986 and professor in 1995. She went on to become the head of the department in 1997 and the dean of the faculty of architecture and planning in 1999.

On 11 September 2014, the Education Ministry of Bangladesh appointed Ekram as the first female vice-chancellor of BUET. She was also the second female to hold the position of VC in the history of the nation. However, only two days after her appointment, Teachers' Association of BUET raised their opposition against the new VC, alleging that seniority has been violated in her appointment. They argued that BUET VCs were appointed based on their seniority and Khaleda Ekram was the 26th senior-most professor in BUET and hence was not eligible for the post. Eventually, the controversy died down and Ekram was able to serve 20 months out of her 4-year term until she became seriously ill in 2016. Within this short period of time, she proved her administrative skills and was credited with bringing back the academic discipline by reducing 'session jam' of BUET. She also patronized and facilitated many extra-curricular activities for the students in an attempt to improve their college experience.

== Awards and honors ==
- Outstanding Alumni Award of the department of Urban and Regional Planning, University of Hawaii, Hawaii, USA, November 2010.
- Chair, Executive Board, East West Center Association (EWCA), Honolulu, Hawaii, USA from July 2007 to July 2010.
- President, Women Architects, Engineers, Planners Association (WAEPA) Bangladesh from 2009 to 2016.
- Member, Executive Board, East West Center Association (EWCA), Honolulu, Hawaii, USA from July 2005 to July 2007.
- Resource person on Commonwealth Association of Architects (CAA) Visiting Board (a full-scale visit – category 4) of the department of architecture, Manipal Institute of Technology, India, 21–27 Sept. 1997; Rizvi College of Architecture and Kamla Raheja Vidyanidhi Institute for Architecture, & Environmental Studies, Mumbai, India, 4–11 December 2005.
- Gender Advisor (From Oct. 1992 to Dec. 2004), Gender Strategy Component (from 2001 known as Gender Equality Policy Group), University of Alberta – BUET Institutional Linkage Project, BUET, Dhaka, Funded by Canadian International Development Agency.
- Honorary Advisor, Bibi Khadeja Kalayan Sangstha, a Nonprofit Welfare Association from 1995 to 2016; raised funds during Natural Calamities, arranged free schooling for under privileged kids, set up cutting and sewing classes for women.
- Nominated External Supervisor of two graduate students, the University of Karlskrona/ Ronneby, Sweden, January 1993 (Due to unavoidable circumstances the students could not come to Bangladesh).
- Stood First Class Second in order of merit among 37 students in the B. Arch. Examination, 1974.
- Anannya Top Ten Awards (2014)
- Begum Rokeya Padak (2023)

== Personal life and death ==
Ekram was married to Architect Haroon ur Rashid. Together they had two daughters, Mariam Ali, an environmentalist, Mashida Rashid, a public health specialist, and a son, Khaled Yasin Rashid, also an environmentalist.

On 11 May 2016, Ekram was admitted to Square Hospital in Dhaka after being diagnosed with non-Hodgkin Lymphoma disease. When her condition deteriorated, she was flown to Bangkok on 14 May. She died at the hospital 10 days later. She was buried in her mother's grave at the Banani Graveyard in Dhaka.

== Selected publications ==
- Rashid, Khaleda (1987). "Building Construction Regulations, 1984—An Evaluation". Environment: Journal of the Faculty of Architecture and Planning. II (1): 49–54.
- —— (1989). "Thoughts on Urban Planning and Development in Bangladesh". Protibesh: Journal of the Department of Architecture, BUET, Dhaka. III (2): 71–74.
- —— (1990). "Cultural and Institutional Buildings". In Zahiruddin, Shah Alam; Imamuddin, Abu H.; Khan, M. Mohiuddin (eds.). Contemporary Architecture, Bangladesh. Institute of Architects, Bangladesh. pp. 67–71. OCLC 24205461.
- —— (1991). "Pourashavas and Urban Development". Protibesh: Journal of the Department of Architecture, BUET, Dhaka. IV (1): 53–62.
- —— (1994). "Architectural Education and Means". Protibesh: Journal of the Department of Architecture, BUET, Dhaka. VIII (1): 99–105.
