= Kamal Ataturk Avenue =

Avenue in Dhaka, Bangladesh

- কামাল আতাতুর্ক এভিনিউ
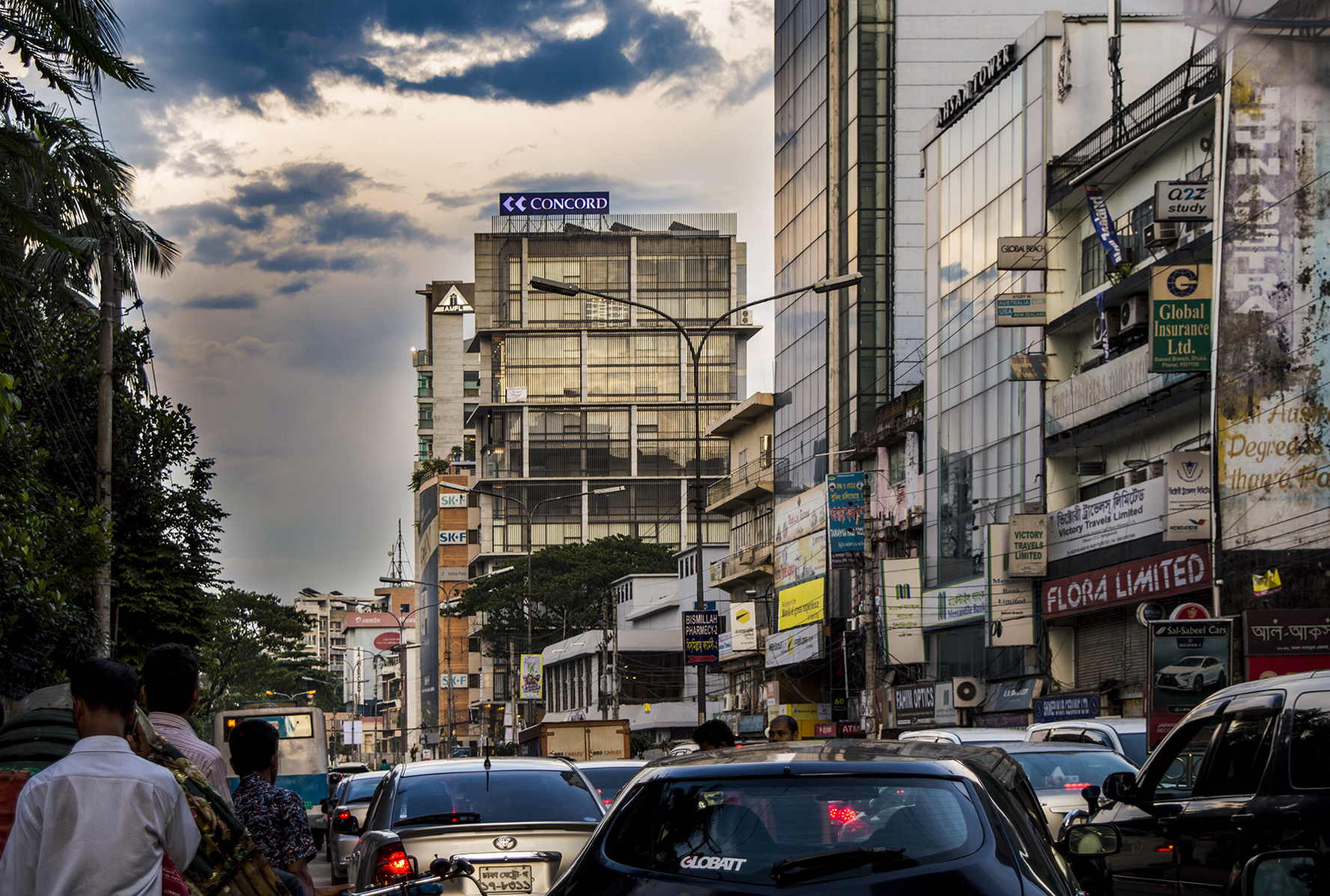
- Kamal Ataturk Avenue at Banani
- Namesake: Mustafa Kemal Atatürk
- Type: Avenue
- Maintained by: Dhaka North City Corporation
- Length: 1 km (0.62 mi)
- Location: Banani, Dhaka, Bangladesh
- Postal code: 1213
- West end: Kakoli Square
- East end: Gulshan North Circle

Kamal Ataturk Avenue is the main avenue of Banani area of Dhaka in Bangladesh. This avenue is a major road in Dhaka which hosts many financial offices. It also hosts many consular offices of various countries. The avenue is named after Mustafa Kemal Atatürk, the founder and first president of Turkey.

== Landmarks ==
- ABC House
- Embassy of Argentina at Bangladesh
- VFS Global Bangladesh
- Premier Bank Headquarters
- Sheraton Dhaka
- State Bank of India Dhaka Branch
- Commercial Bank of Ceylon Dhaka Branch
- Standard Chartered Bank Dhaka Branch
- Primeasia University
- University of Scholars
