= Tapan Chowdhury (businessman) =

Bangladeshi businessman and politician

- তপন চৌধুরী
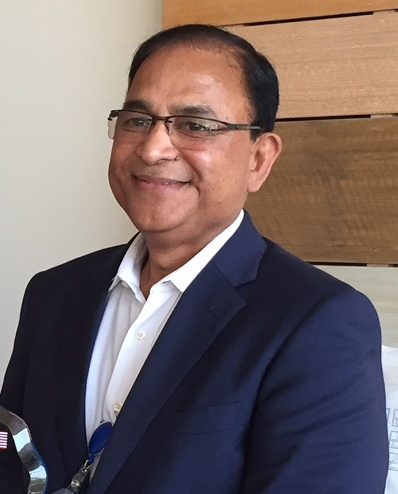
- Chowdhury in 2017

Adviser for Industries of Bangladesh
- In office 14 January 2007 – 8 January 2008
- Chief Adviser: Fakhruddin Ahmed
- Preceded by: Motiur Rahman Nizami
- Succeeded by: Dilip Barua (as minister)

Personal details
- Born: 30 March 1950 (age 76) Pabna District
- Relations: Anjan Chowdhury Samuel s. Chowdhury (brother)
- Parent: Samson H. Chowdhury (father)
- Occupation: Entrepreneur
- Profession: Managing Director
- Known for: Square Pharmaceuticals Limited

Tapan Chowdhury (Bengali: তপন চৌধুরী) is a Bangladeshi businessman. On January 14, 2007, he was appointed as one of the advisers for the Caretaker government of Bangladesh under Chief Adviser Fakhruddin Ahmed. He resigned from caretaker government on January 8, 2008, along with other four advisers.

== Early life ==
Tapan Chowdhury born on 30 March 1950, in Aataikula, Pabna, the second son of Samson H. Chowdhury,

== Business career ==
He is the managing director of Square Pharmaceuticals Limited, Square Textiles Limited and Square Hospital Both companies are among the largest enterprises in their respective sectors.

Chowdhury was a President of Metropolitan Chamber of Commerce and Industry (MCCI). He was also associated with the Young Man Christian Association (YMCA) as its president, and was the vice-president of Bangladesh Baptist fellowship.

He also was a member of the executive committee of the Bangladesh Employers Association, and Bangladesh Textile Mills Association.

Chowdhury's other positions includes the Directorship of Square Toiletries Ltd, Pioneer Insurance Ltd, Continental Hospitals Ltd, and several other companies.
