= Dhaka International University =

Private university in Dhaka, Bangladesh

Dhaka International University (DIU)
- ঢাকা ইন্টারন্যাশনাল ইউনিভার্সিটি
- Other name: DIU
- Motto: Knowledge is Power
- Type: Private
- Established: April 7, 1995; 31 years ago
- Founder: A.B.M Mafizul Islam Patwari
- Accreditation: IEB; BAC; Bar Council; PCB; UNGC; APUB; UNFCCC
- Affiliations: University Grants Commission (Bangladesh)
- Academic affiliations: Putra Business School; Ballari Institute of Technology & Management; Nagarjuna College of Engineering and Technology; MAHSA University; MTC Global, Bangalore, India; Institute of Innovation in Technology & Management; Dr. Ambedkar Institute of Technology; JIS University; Guru Kashi University
- Chancellor: President Mirza Fakhrul Islam Alamgir
- Vice-Chancellor: Dr. Zahidul Islam
- Academic staff: 420
- Students: 8,174
- Location: Satarkul, Badda, Dhaka, 1212, Bangladesh; 23.7938°N 90.4471°E
- Campus: Urban
- Colors: Green, Red
- Website: diu.ac

Dhaka International University (Bengali: ঢাকা ইন্টারন্যাশনাল ইউনিভার্সিটি) is a private university in Dhaka, Bangladesh. It was established on 7 April 1995.

== Campus ==
Dhaka International University (DIU) has a permanent campus located at Satarkul, Badda, Dhaka. The campus covers approximately 1.18 acres and features several academic buildings, including three- and four-storey structures inspired by a blend of contemporary and traditional Mughal architecture. The campus environment is green and eco-friendly, with landscaped open spaces, tree-lined walkways, and a natural pond.

Academic facilities include air-conditioned classrooms equipped with multimedia projectors, campus-wide Wi-Fi, and modern laboratories for engineering, pharmacy, microbiology, biochemistry, and civil engineering. The library offers over 40,000 printed books, thousands of e-books, and fully automated cataloguing systems.

== History ==
The initial planning began in 1994 but the university was established in 1995. It is operated as a non-profitable institutions. The late A.B.M Mafizul Islam Patwari is recognized by the government of Bangladesh as the founder of the university.

== List of vice-chancellors ==
- Saiful Islam (6 February 2022 - 22 May 2024)
- Prof. Dr. Ganesh Chandra Saha (acting) (23 May 2024 - 6 March 2025)
- Dr. Zahidul Islam (7 March 7, 2025 - Till now)

== Academic session ==
The academic year of some degrees of DIU comprises two semesters. Each semester consists of 26 weeks.

- Winter semester: January–June
- Summer semester: July–December

& the academic year of some degrees of DIU comprises three semesters. Each semester consists of four months.

- Spring semester: January to April
- Summer semester: May to August
- Fall semester: September to December

== Faculties and departments ==
The university has the following faculties and departments:

=== Faculty of Arts & Social Science ===
- Department of Economics
  - BSS (Hons) in Economics
  - MSS in Economics
- Department of Education
  - Bachelor of Education (B.Ed.)
  - M.Ed. Program
- Department of English
  - BA (Hons) in English
  - MA in English (1 year)
  - MA in English (2 years 6 months Degree)
- Department of Political Science
  - BSS (Hons) in Political Science
  - MSS in Political Science
- Department of Sociology
  - BSS (Hons) in Sociology
  - MSS in Sociology

=== Faculty of Business Studies ===
- Department of Accounting
  - B.Com. (Hons) in Accounting
  - M.Com. in Accounting
- Department of Business Administration
  - BBA
  - MBA (1 Year Degree)
  - MBA (2 Years Degree)
- Department of Management
  - B.Com. (Hons) in Management
  - M.Com. in Management

=== Faculty of Law ===
- Department of Law
  - LLB (Hons)
  - LLB Course (2 years)
  - LLM
  - LLM (2 years)
  - Master of Human Rights (MHR)

=== Faculty of Pharmacy ===
- Department of Pharmacy
  - B.Sc. (Hon's) in Pharmacy

=== Faculty of Science & Engineering ===
- Department of Civil Engineering
  - B.Sc. in Civil Engineering
- Department of Electrical Electronics and Telecommunication Engineering
  - B.Sc. in Electrical & Electronic Engineering
- Department of Microbiology
  - B.Sc. in Microbiology
- Department of Biochemistry and Molecular Biology
  - B.Sc. in Biochemistry and Molecular Biology

=== Faculty of Science and Agricultural Science ===
- Department of Computer Science and Engineering
  - B.Sc. in Computer Science and Engineering
  - B.Sc. in Electrical Electronics and Telecommunication Engineering
  - M.Sc. in Computer Science & Engineering (1 year)
  - Master in Computer Application (1 year)

== Institutes ==
- Technical & Vocational Education Institute
- Dr.M.I. Patwari Technical & Vocational Education Institute
- Dr.Z.I. Chowdhury Agricultural Research & Training Institute
- Dr.M.I. Patwari Private Engineering Institute
- Sundarganj Driving Training Institute

== Laboratory facilities ==
- The Faculty of Science and Engineering has laboratory facilities.
- The Electrical and Electronic Engineering (EEE) department has laboratory facilities.
- The Pharmacy department has laboratory facilities.

== Clubs ==
Dhaka International University has formally formed different separate clubs for development of student . The following clubs are run successfully by the students and teachers:

- Debating Club
- Computer Programming Club
- Cultural Club
- Sports Club
- DIU Career Development Club.
- DIU Young Entrepreneur Club
- DIU Reading & Research Club
- Civil Engineering Club, DIU

== Research ==
- Tobacco Control & Research Cell (TCRC): The Tobacco Control & Research Cell is a research and advocacy cell of the university that is continuously working on anti-tobacco-related issues and promoting the values of the anti-tobacco movement.
- Social Business Academic Cell (SBAC): The Social Business Academic Cell is a research center of the university that is continuously working on new social business ideas. Social business is a new type of business introduced by Nobel Peace Prize Winner Muhammad Yunus.
- Institutional Quality Assurance Cell (IQAC)
- Centre for Excellence and Career Development (CECD)
- Research and Publication Cell
