= University of Scholars =

Private university based in Dhaka, Bangladesh

- ইউনিভার্সিটি অফ স্কলার্স
- Other names: IUS
- Former names: The International University of Scholars (2015-2024)
- Motto: We build professional
- Type: Private research
- Established: 2015; 11 years ago
- Accreditation: Institution of Engineers, Bangladesh; Accreditation Council for Business Schools and Programs
- Affiliations: University Grants Commission (UGC)
- Chancellor: President Mohammed Shahabuddin
- Vice-Chancellor: Enamul Bashar
- Academic staff: 100 (2024)
- Students: 7000 (2024)
- Undergraduates: 6800 (2024)
- Location: 40, Kamal Atatürk Avenue, Banani, Dhaka, 1213, Bangladesh; 23.7937°N 90.4055°E
- Campus: Urban,
- Language: English
- Colors: White and Purple
- Website: ius.edu.bd

University of Scholars, formally known as The International University of Scholars, or IUS, is a private university based in Dhaka, Bangladesh. In 2024, This University got approval from UGC to change its official name from The International University of Scholars to University of Scholars

== History ==
University of Scholars, was established in 2015 at Badda with five departments. The government provided permission to the university on 11 January 2016; the request was filled by Jamil Habib. According to the New Age report on 4 August 2022 the university only had only one full professor.

== Administration ==
=== List of vice-chancellors ===
- Abdus Sattar, 1 March 2019 – 28 February 2023
- Mamunur Rashid (acting) 1 March 2023 –21 December 2023
- Enamul Bashar, 22 December 2023

=== Trustee Board ===
Name	Position	Reference
M. Farid Habib	Chairman	
Abdur Rahman	General Secretary	
Md. Ariful Hoque Shuhan	Vice-chairman	
Abu Bakar Shiddik	Treasurer	
S. M. Faysal	Joint Treasurer	
Md. Jahangir Al Jilani	Trustee	
Emdadul Hoque	Trustee	
Mustazab Hossain	Trustee	
Abdul Hasib Siddique	Trustee	

== Academic departments ==
There are three faculty and six departments of this university.

=== Faculty of Business ===
- Department of Business Administration
  - BBA
  - MBA
  - EMBA

=== Faculty of Arts and Social Sciences ===
- Department of English
  - BA in ENGLISH

=== Faculty of Engineering ===
- Department of Computer Science and Engineering
  - BSc in CSE
- Department of Electrical and Electronics Engineering
  - BSc in EEE
- Department of Textile Engineering
  - BSc in Textile
- Department of Natural Science

== Notable people ==
- Shahriar Nafees a faculty member in Business studies.
- Osman Hadi a faculty member in English Department.
