= Noorul Quader =

Bangladeshi politician (1935–1998)

Mohammad Noorul Quader
- মোহাম্মদ নুরুল কাদের
- Born: Mohammad Noorul Quader Khan; 2 December 1935; Mymensingh, Bangladesh
- Died: 13 September 1998 (aged 62)
- Other name: Jhilu
- Citizenship: Bangladesh
- Education: Dhaka College; Dhaka University
- Known for: Entrepreneur, pioneer of Bangladesh's export-oriented ready made garment industry
- Spouse: Rokeya Quader
- Children: 2
- Relatives: Sayed Farooq-ur-Rahman (nephew); Khaled Mosharraf (cousin); A R Mallick (cousin); Ataur Rahman Khan (uncle)

Mohammed Noorul Quader (2 December 1935 – 13 September 1998) was a Bangladeshi freedom fighter, government officer, and entrepreneur. He was the first establishment secretary of the Mujibnagar Government Probashi Sarkar, the first secretary of Bangladesh, and a pioneer of Bangladesh's export-oriented ready made garment industry. He was also the founding chairman of the Bangladesh Parjatan Corporation and the founder of the Desh Group.

== Early life and education ==
Mohammad Noorul Quader Khan was born into one of the zamindar families of the Jamalpur region of Mymensingh, the family descended from Turkish mercenaries under the Mughal emperors. His father was Abdul Latif Khan and his mother was Kulsum Begum. He was the youngest of six siblings.

In 1950, Mohammad Noorul Quader Khan graduated from Armanitola Government High School. He attended Dhaka College for two years, and after passing the college's intermediate exam Noorul Quader joined the Pakistan Air Force in 1952. He was discharged from the air force shortly after due to health issues, and in 1954 he enrolled in Dhaka University, where he received a Bachelor of Commerce degree.

== Participation in the Bangladesh Liberation War ==
Mohammad Noorul Quader Khan was serving as the district commissioner of Pabna during the Bangladesh Liberation War. Under his leadership, the district was kept free of the Pakistani military. At this time, in protest of the actions of the Pakistani military, Noorul Quader Khan stopped using the last name 'Khan' and adopted the name Mohammad Noorul Quader. That year, Indian filmmaker S. Shukhdeb filmed the documentary Nine Months to Freedom: The Story of Bangladesh, for which Noorul Quader was interviewed. After Bangladesh gained independence, he was appointed as the Secretary of the Establishment of Government, though he willfully resigned before the end of his term.

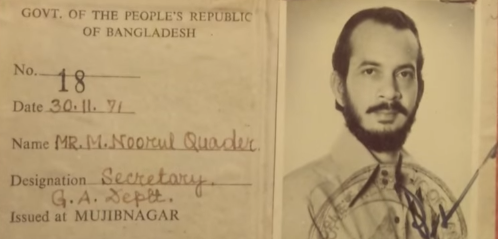
Noorul Quader's Passport during War of Liberation 1971

== Work life ==
=== Civil service career ===
Noorul Quader passed the Pakistani government's civil service exam (CSP) in 1960 and began his career as a government officer in 1961. In 1963, he was appointed as the subdivisional officer for Chandpur Mahakuma. His work as an administrator was notable, and he was quickly promoted to the state ministry as a deputy secretary. He served as district commissioner of Chittagong until 1970, when he was appointed as the district commissioner of Pabna. After the Bangladesh Liberation War, Noorul Quader served as the first chairman of the Bangladesh Parjatan Corporation, then known as the Tourism Bureau. Under his leadership, the bureau was corporatized and a logo was designed by Kalidas Karmakar.

=== Establishing the Desh Group ===
Noorul Quader established the Desh Group in 1974. In December 1977, he established Desh Garments. In 1978, the Daewoo Corporation of Korea proposed a joint venture with Bangladesh, proposing that manufacture of wheels, processed leather products, cement, and readymade garments be centered in the country. The Bangladeshi government chose to lead with readymade garments, and chose Noorul Quader's proposal due to his experience with both foreign business and government work. A joint venture deal was signed between Desh Garments and Daewoo Corporation on 4 July 1978. With this, Desh Garments became the first export oriented garment industry in Bangladesh and a pioneer of the textile industry in Bangladesh. The factory sent staff to South Korea to learn about the garments trade from Daewoo in the early 1980s.

Desh Agencies Limited was established in 1978 as a clearing and forwarding agency.

Desh Real Estate Limited was established in 1980 as an industrial land developer near Dhaka and Chittagong.

Jenk Industries Limited was established in 1988 as a manufacturer of cardboard boxes.

== Personal life ==
Noorul Quader married Rokeya Quader in 1973. The couple had two children, a son and a daughter. He died in 1998 at the age of 62. Today, Rokeya Quader is the chairperson of Desh Group, his son, Omar Quader Khan is the managing director of Desh Group, and his daughter, Vidiya Amrit Khan is the director of Desh Group.

== Published books ==
No	Name	Year of publication	Publication Agency
1	Ekattor Amar	1999	Sahitya Prakash
