= Enamul Bashar =

Bangladeshi academic

Professor Dr. Enamul Bashar

Vice-Chancellor of University of Scholars
- Incumbent
- Assumed office 1 February 2024
- Preceded by: Dr. Md. Mamunur Rashid

Personal details
- Education: Ph.D (Electrical Engineering)
- Alma mater: Saint Petersburg Polytechnical University

Enamul Bashar is an academic. He is vice chancellor of the University of Scholars.
