= Carmen Lamagna =

Filipino academic

Carmen Zita Lamagna
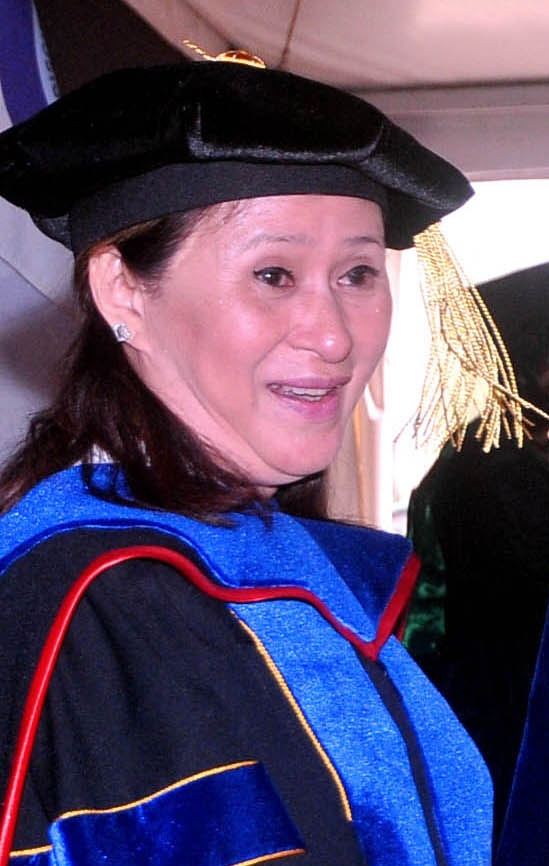
- Carmen in 2018

Vice-Chancellor of American International University-Bangladesh
- In office 1997 – December 2023
- Succeeded by: Saiful Islam

Personal details
- Born: Carmen Zita Lamagna; 1 December 1956 (age 69) Manila, Philippines
- Education: BSc; Master's; Ph.D. (Business development)
- Alma mater: Adamson University; Philippine Normal University; Rizal Technological University; University of the East; California Coast University
- Occupation: university academic

Carmen Zita Lamagna (born 1 December 1956) is a Filipino academic. She was the former vice-chancellor of American International University-Bangladesh (AIUB), appointed by the president of Bangladesh. In 1997, by becoming VC of AIUB, she became the first female vice chancellor of a university in Bangladesh. She also served as the president of Association of the Universities of Asia and the Pacific (AUAP) and treasurer of International Association of University Presidents (IAUP).

== Early life ==
Carmen Z. Lamagna was born in Manila, Philippines on December 1, 1956.

== Education and career ==
Lamagna earned her bachelor's degree in chemical engineering in 1978 from Adamson University, Manila. She received three master's degrees from Philippine Normal University (1990), Rizal Technological University (1994), and University of the East (1995). In 2003, she obtained her Ph.D. in business administration from California Coast University.

Lamagna was a faculty member of Perpetual Help University (1978–1979) and AMA Computer College (1982–1994). She served as the project director of AIUB during 1994–1996 and as an assistant vice president of business development in AMA Computer College in 1996. She was appointed as the vice-chancellor of AIUB in 1997. She became the first female vice-chancellor of a university in Bangladesh.

== Awards ==
Lamagna won the Presidential Award for Filipino Individuals and Organizations Overseas in 2006 by President of the Philippines Gloria Macapagal Arroyo. In 2012 she was named as one of the top 100 women of the world in the education category by the International Alliance of Women (IAW).
