= Banani Lake =

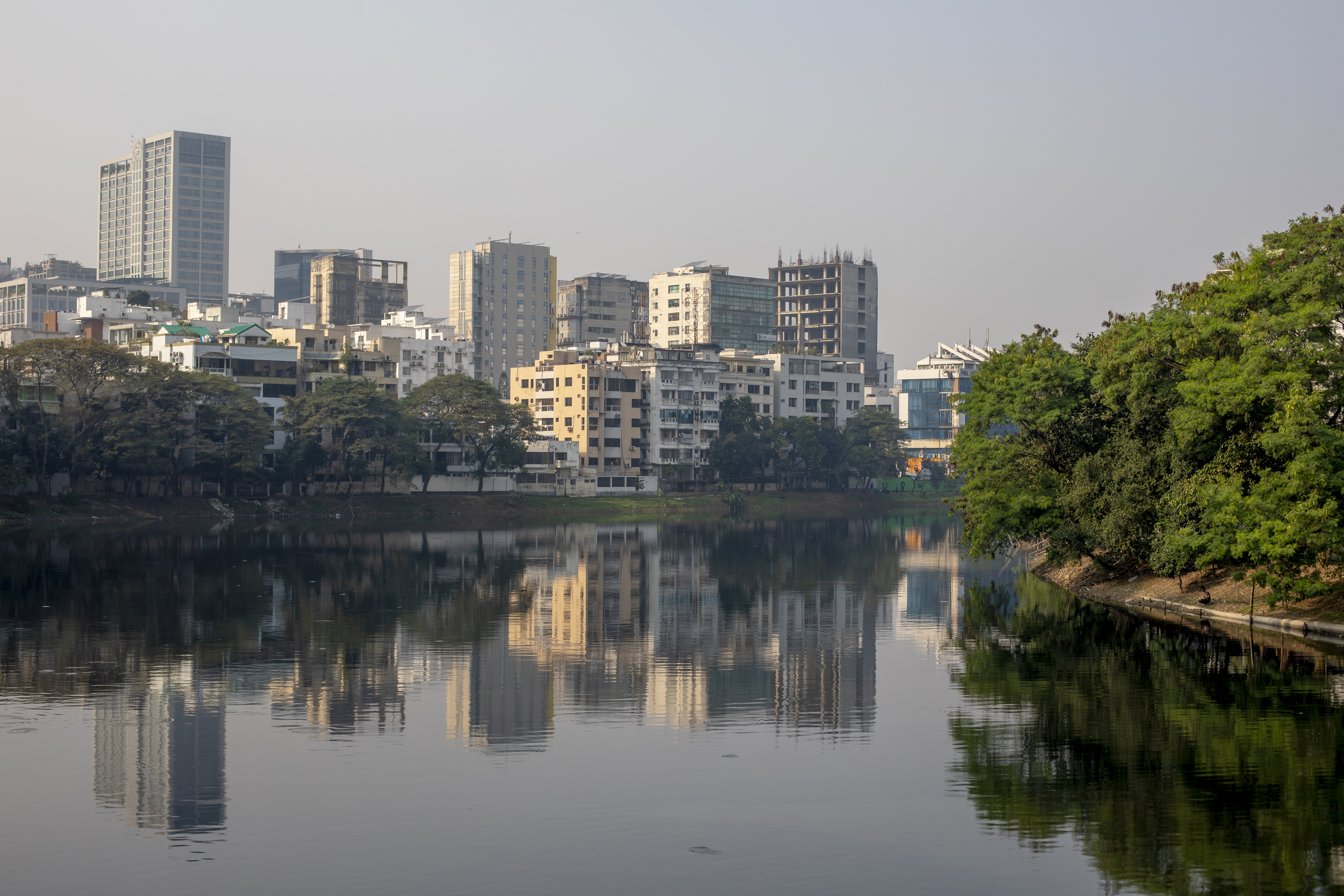
- View looking northwest from Banani Bridge, 2021

- Location within Bangladesh
- Location: Dhaka, Bangladesh
- Coordinates: 23.785°N 90.414°E
- Type: Lake

Banani Lake is a lake in Dhaka, Bangladesh, bordering Banani, Gulshan, Mohakhali and Korail.

== History ==
Following the July 2016 Dhaka attack, the government imposed a ban on boats in the lake because of security concerns. The lake has faced encroachment from the Karail area. The lake borders the posh neighborhood of Gulshan and one of the largest slums in Bangladesh, Korail.
