= Saiful Islam (vice-chancellor) =

Bangladeshi academic

- সাইফুল ইসলাম
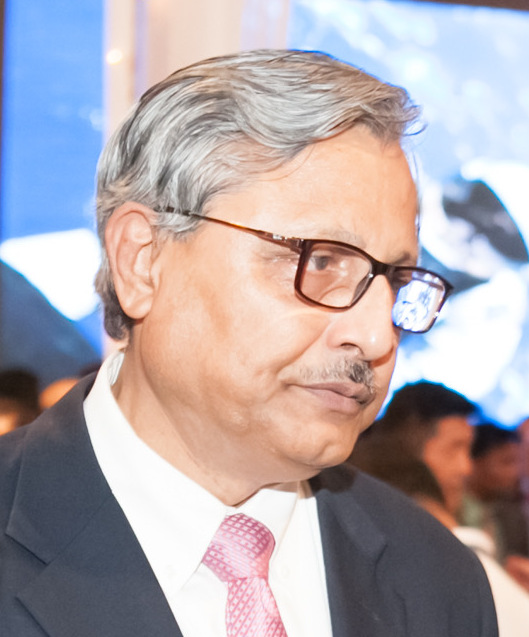
- Saiful Islam in 2018

Vice-Chancellor of American International University-Bangladesh
- Incumbent
- Assumed office 23 May 2024
- Preceded by: Carmen Lamagna

Vice-Chancellor of Dhaka International University
- In office 7 February 2022 – 22 May 2024
- Preceded by: K.M. Mohsin
- Succeeded by: Zahidul Islam

13th Vice-Chancellor of Bangladesh University of Engineering and Technology
- In office 23 June 2016 – 25 June 2020
- Preceded by: Khaleda Ekram
- Succeeded by: Satya Prasad Majumder

Pro Vice-Chancellor of Primeasia University
- In office 26 August 2013 – 22 June 2016

Personal details
- Education: BSc Engg; MSc Engg; Ph.D. (Electrical engineering); Bangladesh University of Engineering and Technology University of Cambridge
- Occupation: Academic, Professor
- Institutions: Bangladesh University of Engineering and Technology

Saiful Islam (Bengali: সাইফুল ইসলাম) is a Bangladeshi academic who is the current Vice-Chancellor of the American International University-Bangladesh (AIUB). Previously he served as the Vice-Chancellor of the Dhaka International University. He was also the 13th Vice-Chancellor of Bangladesh University of Engineering and Technology (BUET). Before, he worked as the Pro-Vice Chancellor of the Primeasia University.

== Education ==
Saiful Islam earned his Bachelor's and Master's in Electrical Engineering from Bangladesh University of Engineering and Technology in 1975 and 1977 respectively. He obtained his Ph.D. degree from University of Cambridge in 1986.

== Career ==
Saiful Islam started his teaching career as a lecturer in the Department of Electrical Engineering of BUET in May 1975. He became Professor in 1988. He served as the Dean of the Faculty of Electrical and Electronic Engineering during 1995–1997. During March 2002 - August 2006, was the First Dean and Professor of Engineering Faculty of American International University-Bangladesh (on leave from BUET). From August 2013 until June 2016, Prof. Islam worked as the pro-vice-chancellor of Primeasia University, a private university in Dhaka, after he was appointed by the President of Bangladesh.

On 22 June 2016, Prof. Islam was selected as the 13th Vice-Chancellor of BUET. The post was vacant since Khaleda Ekram had died on 24 May 2016. He was VC of BUET until 25 June 2020. Following the murder of Abrar Fahad, a second year EEE student and resident at the Sher-e-Bangla Hall of BUET, on 7 October 2019, massive protest spread all over the university campus. But Islam didn't show up after the murder incident, resulting in tremendous criticism throughout the country. Later on 9 October 2019, he went to visit victim Abrar's home at Kushtia, where he met immense public protest and couldn't enter his home. The Teachers' Association of BUET and Alumni Association of BUET demanded his resignation as vice-chancellor due to his failure. Saiful denied his failure.

From 7 February 2022 until 22 May 2024 he worked as a VC of Dhaka International University.

On 23 May 2024, he was appointed as the VC of the American International University-Bangladesh by the President of Bangladesh.

== Awards ==
- Gold Medal by Bangladesh Academy of Sciences (1988)
