= The New School Dhaka =

Location
- Banani, Dhaka; Bangladesh
- Coordinates: 23°47′38.37″N 90°24′15.38″E

Information
- Type: Coed P-12 School
- Motto: Learning Living Leading
- Established: 2007
- Principal: Sabuj Ahmed
- Faculty: 32
- Grades: PG-A Level
- Enrollment: 300
- Colors: Grey, White
- Website: nsdschool.com

The New School Dhaka (NSD) is a private English medium school in Dhaka, Bangladesh that offers International General Certificate of Secondary Education (IGCSE) as well as Advanced Level Qualifications under Edexcel, a Pearson company. It caters to the community of Banani, Dhaka.

== History ==
The school was set up in 2007 in response to the need for an international school in the fast-growing community of Banani and Gulshan. NSD graduates carry with them the school motto – "Learning, Living, Leading" – wherever at home and abroad they are.

The school is run by a three-member management team.

== Curriculum ==
NSD offers a complete primary, secondary and high school programme leading to the International General Certificate of Secondary Education (IGCSE) and International Advanced Level (IAL) examinations under Edexcel, UK which are conducted by the British Council in Dhaka.
