= Mayalogy =

Mayalogy Ltd.
- Type: Private
- Industry: Digital Healthcare
- Incorporated: Singapore
- Founded: 2011
- Founder: Ivy Huq Russell
- Headquarters: Dhaka, Bangladesh
- Area served: Bangladesh, Asia
- Products: Mobile app, website, eCommerce, prescription
- Services: Online consultation, Anonymous Question & Answer
- Website: maya.com.bd

Mayalogy Limited, operating currently as Maya (previously as Maya Apa), is an online health and well-being company based in Dhaka, Bangladesh that provides on-demand information, in partnership with the non-governmental development organization BRAC. Maya's platform is available on the web and on Android, in Bangla and English.

Ivy Huq Russell, a former investment banker, is the founder and CEO of Maya. Maya Apa, meaning Sister Maya, was named after Russell's mother, who fought breast cancer in 2009.

Recent iterations of the Maya platform have shifted from a focus on serving women to become gender agnostic. It has evolved from being primarily content-based to become an on-demand information and messaging platform.

In 2017, Maya Apa became the first Bangladeshi startup selected to join Google's Launchpad Accelerator programme, joining the fifth cohort.

== History ==
The idea of Maya Apa first came to Ivy Huq Russell when she was pregnant with her daughter, Ameenah. She realized the importance of having useful, accessible information about pregnancy and the female body, as well as being able to interact with other women going through similar experiences. This led her to start a blog with women-centric content, "dedicated to empowering women through access to information and a shared community." She reached out to her friends in the medical field who provided their knowledge and expertise in obstetrics and other women's health issues. On a whim, Russell placed a comment box on the website prompting the visitor to "ask Maya Apa anything," routing the questions to her network of experts. Russell and her team soon realized that this was a popular feature, and by 2014, were focused on developing it as a full-fledged service. In 2014, the company started working in partnership with BRAC.

In 2021, the company raised $2.2 million as a seed investment.

As of 2024, development on the mobile app had halted in 2022 and no further update was pushed.

In 2026, the website showed that the maya.com.bd domain showing Maya skincare products from square toiletries.

=== Maya app ===
Maya partnered with BRAC to develop the Maya Android mobile app, which was released on February 3, 2015. Maya Apa's team, consisting of two female engineers at the time, developed and delivered the app in three months. The primary feature of the app is the ability to post questions and receive answers within 48 hours, while also retaining the articles and blog content of the website. Like the website, the app also maintains the anonymity of its users, allowing them to overcome the social stigma associated with seeking information and discussing issues like reproductive health.

Maya was awarded the ICT Innovation Fund by the government of Bangladesh in 2016.

=== Maya Apa Plus ===
In February 2017, Maya Apa launched a premium service called Maya Apa Plus with the mobile network operator Robi, for Robi customers. Maya Apa Plus was made available through subscription packages on the mobile app as well as through SMS. The premium service sought to answer subscribers' questions in 10 minutes, and provided a number of added features on the mobile app.

In the same month, BRAC announced that it would invest a further BDT 40 million in Maya Apa at a partnership signing ceremony where the then state minister for post and telecommunications, Tarana Halim, was present as the chief guest. As a part of this initiative, Maya Apa was also slated to provide its services to 50,000 women in readymade garments factories for a pilot project by BRAC's urban development programme.

In 2018, Maya Apa was one of the four startups shortlisted by the Bangladeshi government for investments of BDT 50-100 million in exchange for a portion of equity, under its iDEA (innovation, Design, and Entrepreneurship Academy) project. The other three startups were Sheba.xyz, HungryNaki, and Augmedix.

== Services ==
Maya primarily provides an anonymous messaging service, whereby users can post their health, psycho-social, and legal questions. Maya uses machine learning to automatically sort and route each question to a doctor, counsellor, lawyer, or another relevant expert who answers it. Users can ask their questions in Bangla, English, or Banglish, and receive responses from experts in the same language.

== Awards ==
- 2015 Bangladesh Brand Forum Inspiring Women Award, Best Startup
