= Banani (neighbourhood) =

Major neighbourhood of Dhaka

Banani বনানী
- Neighbourhood
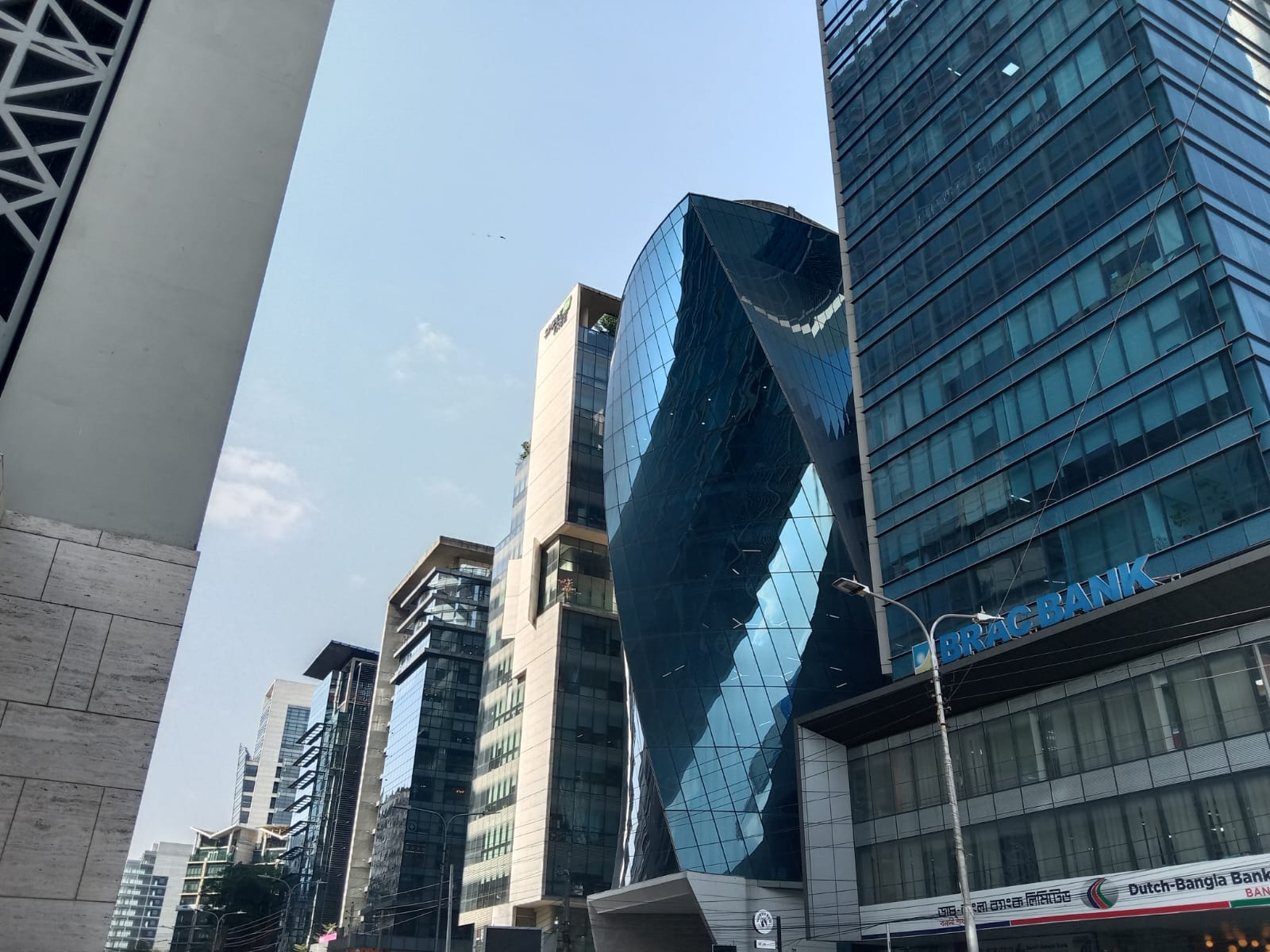
- Skyline of Banani
- Interactive map of Banani
- Location of Banani within Dhaka Location of Banani within Dhaka Division Location of Banani within Bangladesh
- Coordinates: 23.790356°N 90.407837°E
- Country: Bangladesh
- Division: Dhaka Division
- District: Dhaka District
- City Corporation: Dhaka North City Corporation
- Time zone: UTC+6 (Bangladesh Time)
- Postal Code: 1213
- Area code: 02
- Notable sport teams: Old DOHS SC

Banani is an upscale residential and commercial neighbourhood and a thana (precinct) of Dhaka. It hosts five-star hotels, upscale restaurants, luxury apartments, international schools, and the offices of many local and multinational companies. Banani is considered an important central business district (CBD), and its commercial landscape is among the most important in Dhaka, coming after the likes of the nearby financial district of Gulshan Avenue, Karwan Bazar, Tejgaon Industrial Area and downtown Motijheel CBD, the nation's largest and most important CBD.

== Geography ==
Banani is located at 23.7950°N 90.4047°E. It has a lake called Banani Lake. Korail slum is located on the border of Banani. It is a part of Ward No. 19 of DNCC.

== History ==
In November 2016, the Dhaka North City Corporation demolished the home of former East Pakistan Governor Abdul Monem Khan.

In 2019, 19 were killed in the FR Tower fire.

== Population ==
Religions in Banani Thana (2022)
Religion	Percent
Islam	95.24%
Hinduism	3.72%
Christianity	0.86%
Other or not stated	0.18%

According to the 2022 Bangladeshi census, Banani Thana had 58,938 households and a population of 184,476. 6.92% of the population were under 5 years of age. Banani had a literacy rate (age 7 and over) of 80.66%: 83.33% for males and 77.04% for females, and a sex ratio of 132.10 males for every 100 females.

== Economy ==
Banani is home to the headquarters of several national corporations, including Mayalogy, Maasranga Television, and The Premier Bank PLC.VFS Global

== Education ==
- The International University of Scholars (2015)
- Primeasia University (2003)
- Banani Bidyaniketan School and College
- South Point School and College, Banani Campus
- The New School Dhaka

== Gallery ==
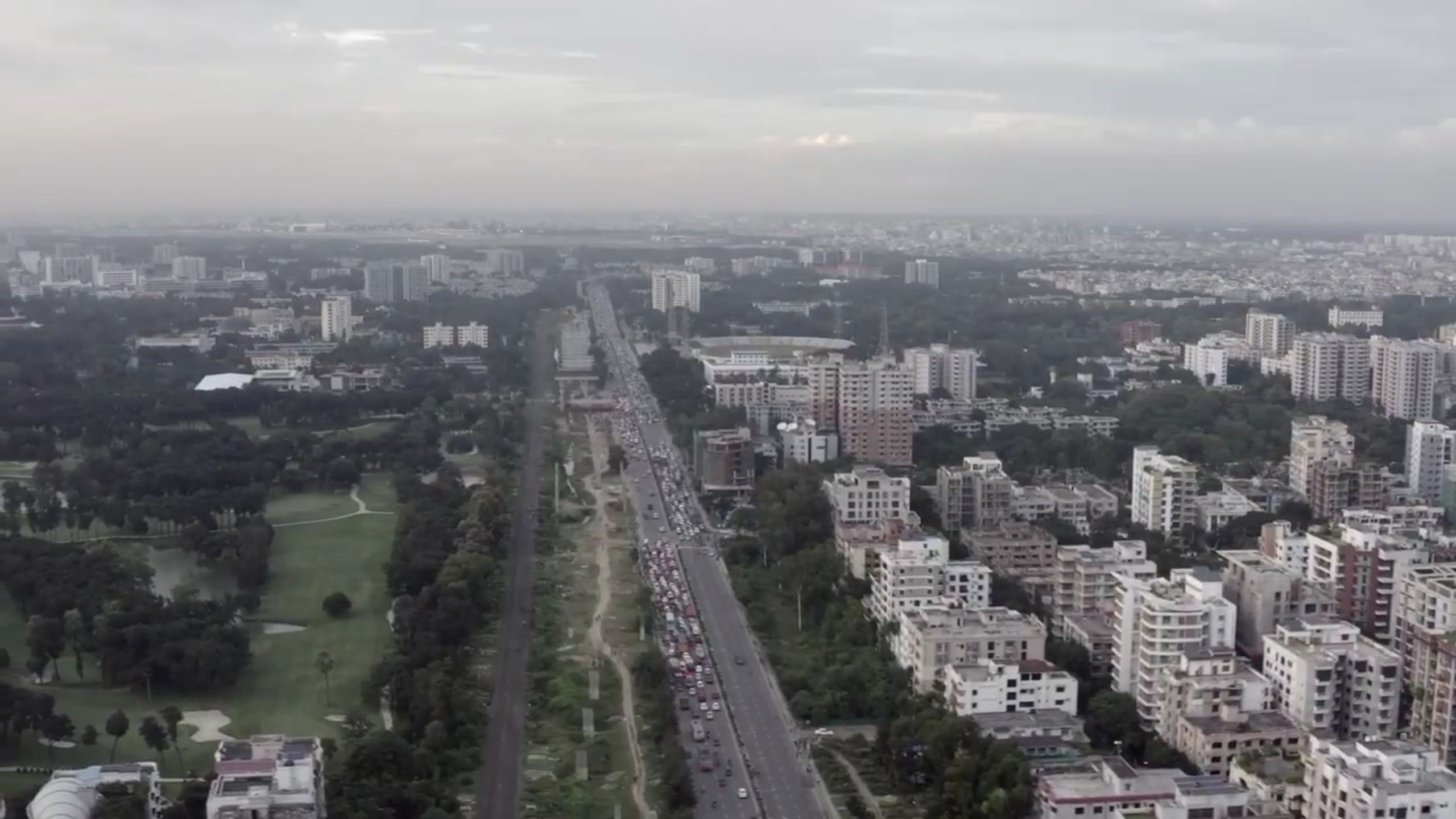
Banani birds eye view

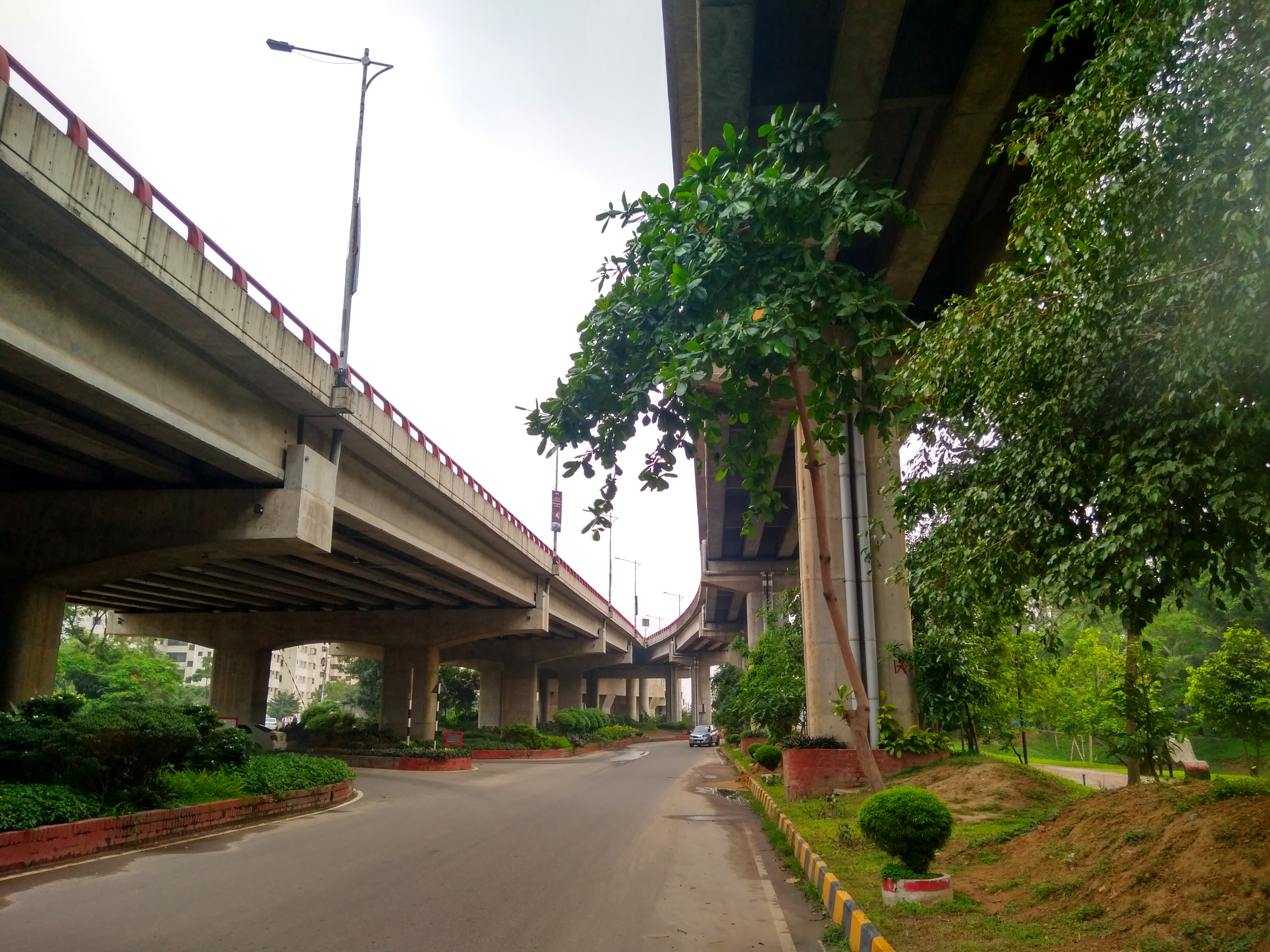
Banani overpass

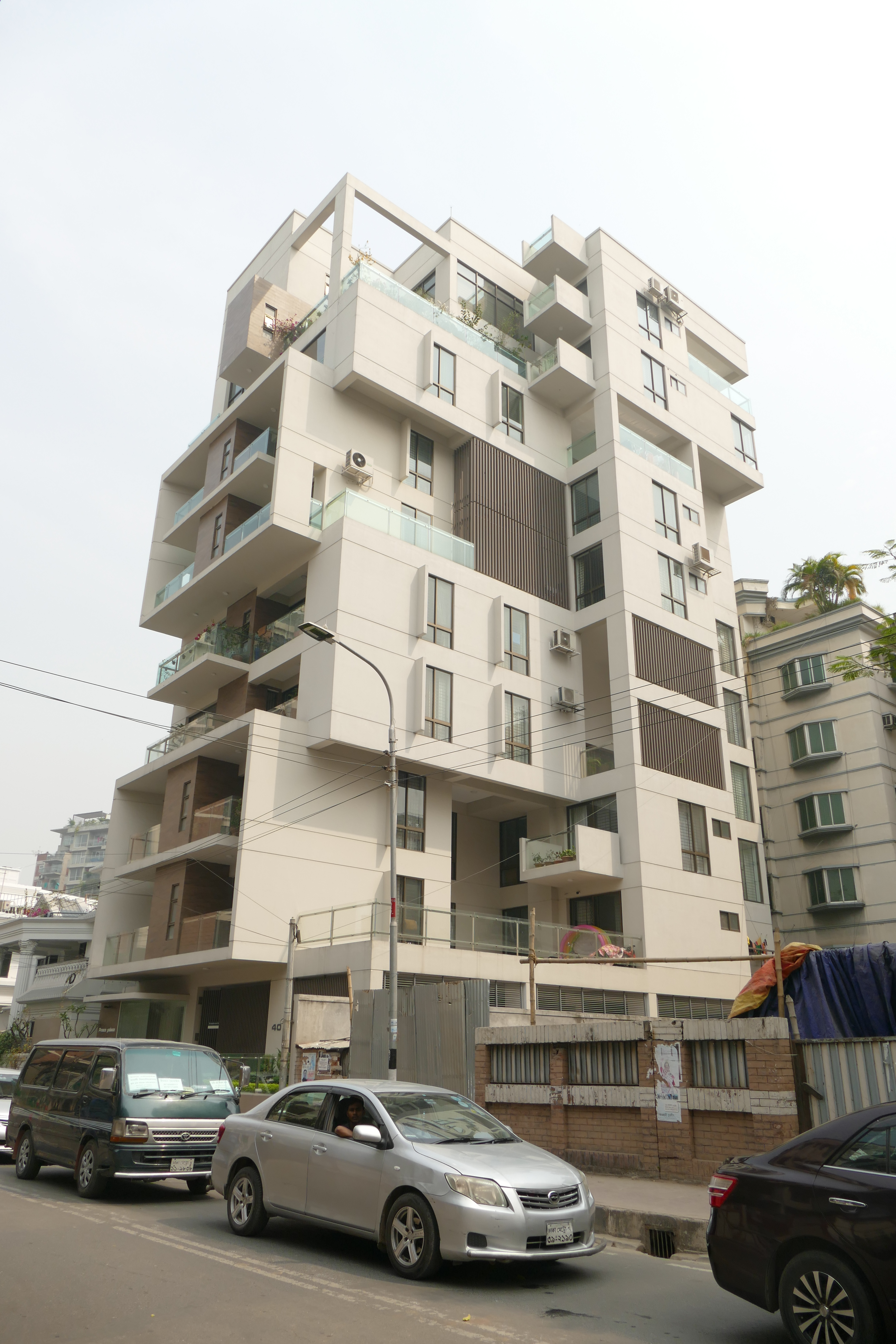
A residential house in Banani neighborhood

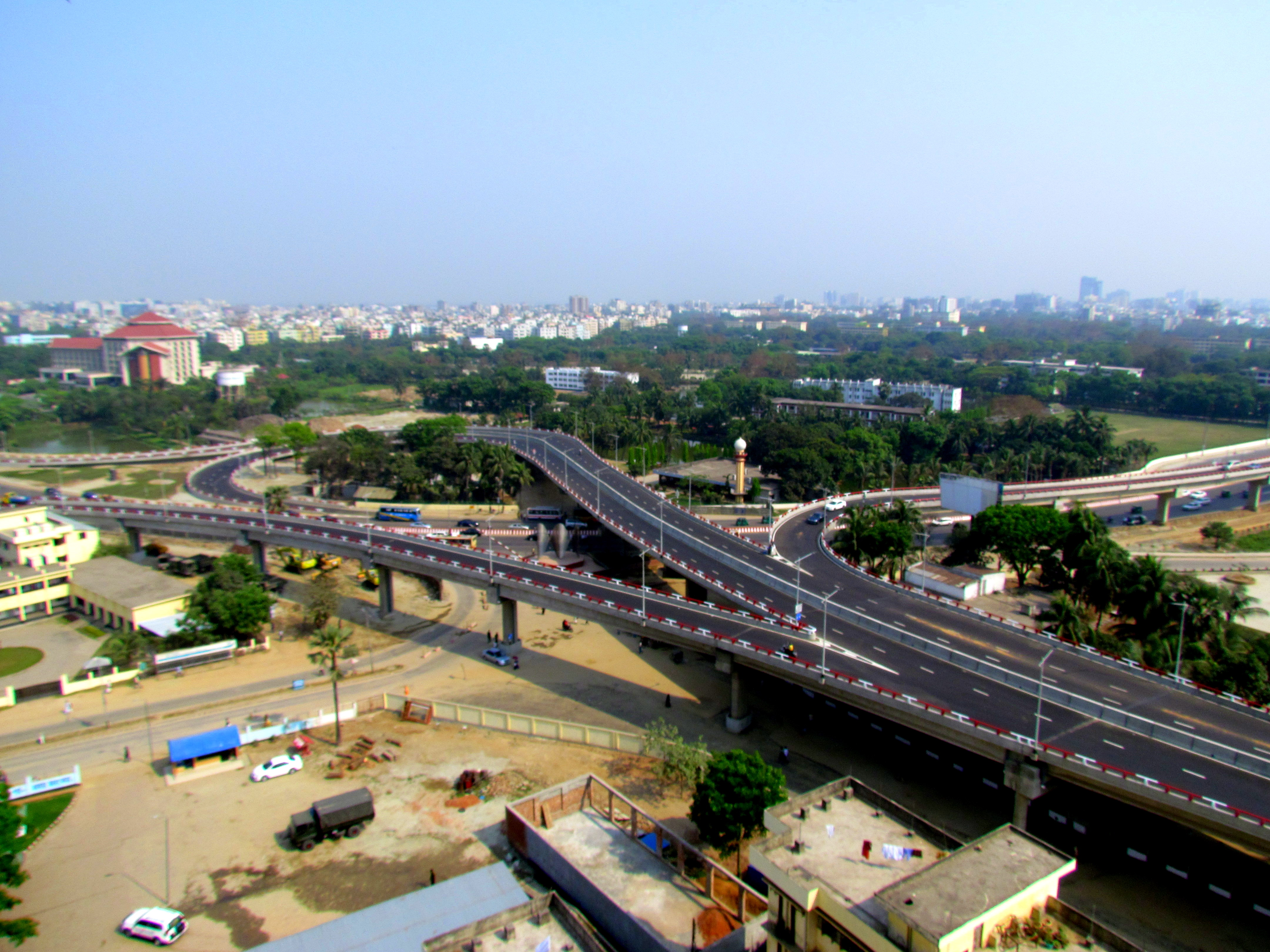
Mirpur-Banani flyover

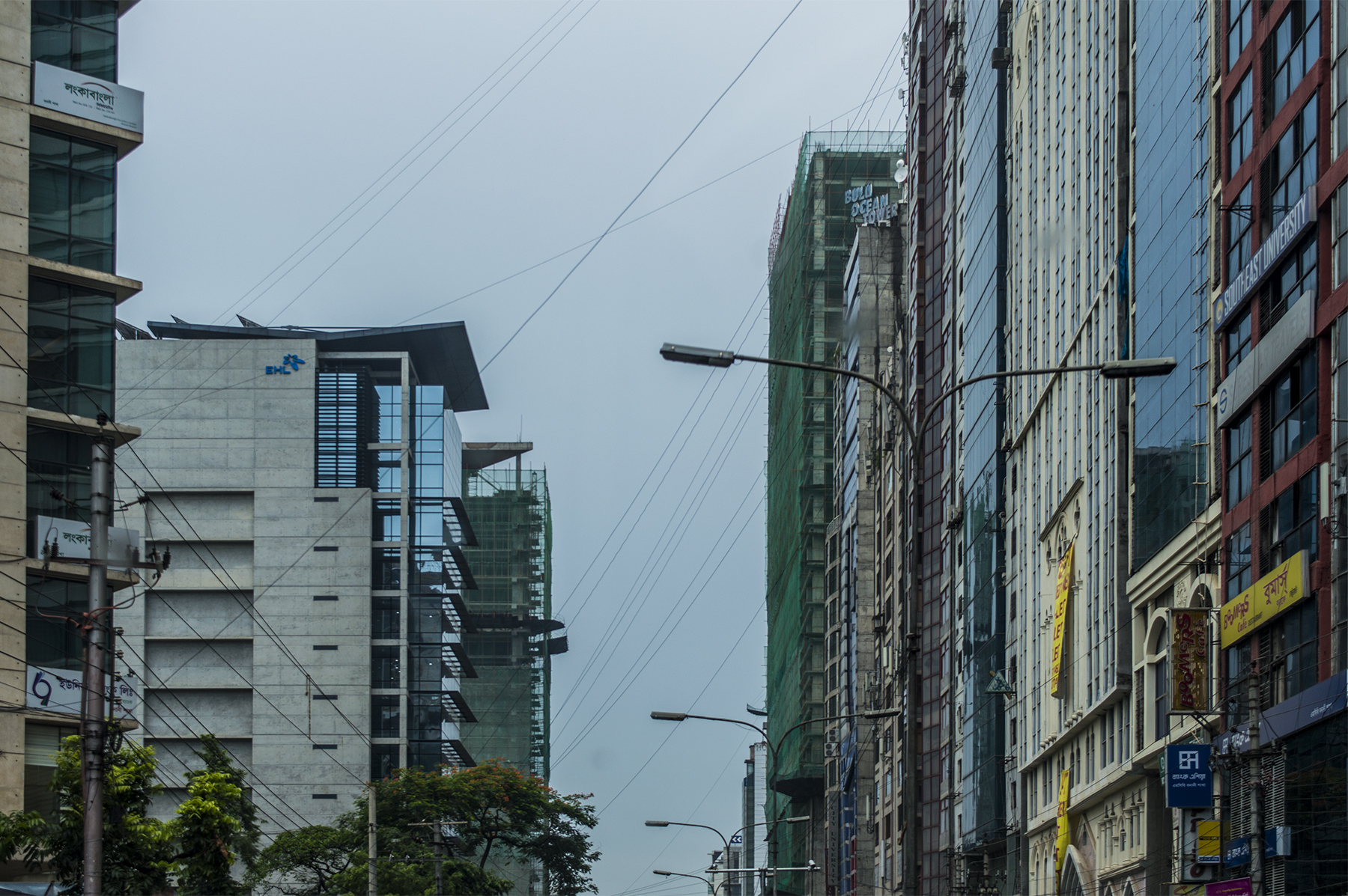
Banani Kamal Ataturk Road
