= Association of the Universities of Asia and the Pacific =

- Abbreviation: AUAP
- Formation: 1995
- Type: NGO
- Location: Thailand
- Website: auap.org

The Association of the Universities of Asia and the Pacific (AUAP) is a non-governmental organization to promote collaboration among universities in the Asia-Pacific region.

== History and overview ==
It takes more than 17 years under the support of UNESCO for Association of Universities of Asia and the Pacific (AUAP) to be established with an aim to promote academic collaboration in Asia and the Pacific. The latest conference came to the conclusion that the AUAP head office will be located at Suranaree University of Technology and AUAP members from more than 150 universities from 17 countries elected Wichit Srisa-an as the 1st president. The AUAP president will promote academic activities to expand the collaboration among the members.

The conference on establishment of AUAP was organized on 28 July 1995 at Surasammanakhan, Suranaree University of Technology, Nakhon Ratchasima province with attendants being representatives from 150 universities in 17 countries in Asia and the Pacific. On this occasion, there were the signing ceremony, selection of the head office location, and election of the president and executive committee. The conference invited guests from international organizations such as ASEAN, SEAMEO, UNESCO, ESCAP, and IAU as the witnesses to the ceremony.

After the signing ceremony, there was the election of Wichit Srisa-an, Founding Rector of Suranaree University of Technology, and Former Minister of Higher Education, Research and Innovation, Thailand as the Founding of AUAP President, Donald Mc Nicol from University of Sydney, Australia as the 1st Vice President and Emmanuel Angeles from Angeles Foundation University, the Philippines as the 2nd Vice President. The executive committee consists of university representatives from 5 countries including China, India, Indonesia, Macau, and Vietnam while the reserving executive committee consists of university representatives from 7 countries including Bangladesh, Fiji, Hong Kong, Japan, South Korea, Malaysia, and New Zealand. Two meetings of the members and committee were held afterwards in which the latter was aimed to determine the AUAP role and activity plan. The committee selected the head office location to be in SUT campus area, Nakhon Ratchasima.

The AUAP was established on 28 July 1995 with its head office to be located at Suranaree University of Technology, Nakhon Ratchasima, Thailand. The AUAP members consist of 150 universities from 18 countries including Commonwealth of Australia, New Zealand, People’s Republic of China, Japan, Hong Kong SAR, Macau SAR, Republic of Indonesia, The Federation of Malaya, Republic of the Philippines, Socialist Republic of Vietnam, Kingdom of Cambodia, Republic of Korea, People’s Republic of Bangladesh, Republic of India, Islamic Republic of Pakistan, Islamic Republic of Iran, Republic of Fiji, and Kingdom of Thailand. The objective of AUAP is to foster academic collaboration, academic service, and continual development in education which will be beneficial to Thailand and all countries in Asia and the Pacific.

== List of AUAP presidents ==
- Wichit Srisa-an (Thailand) - 28 July 1995 – 8 December 1997
- Donald McNicol (Australia)- 9 December 1997 – 24 November 1999
- Emmanuel Y. Angeles (Philippines) -25 November 1999 – 22 October 2001
- Li Jian Shi (China) -23 October 2001 – 13 March 2002
- Shuping Chen (China) -13 May 2002 – 9 October 2003
- Chugwon Choue (South Korea) -10 October 2003 – 28 March 2004
- Wibisono Hardjopranoto (Indonesia)-29 March 2004 – 21 October 2006
- Iu Vai Pan ( Macau) -22 October 2006 – 7 November 2008
- Carmen Z. Lamagna (Bangladesh)- 8 November 2008 – 7 November 2010
- Prasat Suebka (Thailand)- 8 November 2010 – 4 December 2012
- Sharifah Hapsah Syed Hasan Shahabudin (Malaysia)- 5 December 2012 – 6 November 2013
- Noor Azlan Ghazali (Malaysia)- 7 November 2013 – 14 November 2014
- Shawn C. Chen (P.R. China)- 15 November 2014 – 31 December 2016
- Sunghee Nam (South Korea)- 1 January 2017- 18 November 2018
- Mahmud Nili Ahmadabadi (Islamic Republic of Iran) - January 1, 2019- December 31, 2020
- Peter P. Laurel (Philippines) - January 1, 2021 - December 31, 2022
- Md Sabur Khan (Bangladesh) - January 1, 2023 - December 31, 2024
- Hari Mohan Gupta (India) - Effective From January 1, 2025 - December 31, 2026

== See also ==
- List of higher education associations and alliances
