= Bombay Sweets (Bangladesh) =

Bangladeshi snack chip brand

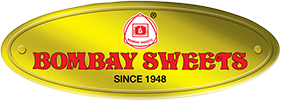
- Logo Since 1948
- Product type: Private limited company
- Current owner: Salim Jivani (Chairman)
- Country: Bangladesh
- Introduced: 1948; 78 years ago
- Markets: Worldwide
- Website: bombaysweetsbd.com

Bombay Sweets is a manufacturer and food processing company from Bangladesh since 1948. It is most noted for its "Potato Chips" and "Chanachur". It also produces beverages, frozen foods and spices. It is one of the oldest companies in Bangladesh.

== History ==
Bombay Sweets was established in Nawabpur, Old Dhaka in 1948. It launched chanachur that same year.

Bombay Sweets launched Ring chips in 1985.

Bombay Sweets launched Potato Crackers in 1988. It also launched Mr. Twist in 1992. In 1998, it established Tricepack Ltd to manufacture packaging.

Bombay Sweets launched Alooz in 2012.

Bombay Sweets launched Pastachips in 2017. A 2018 study by Environment and Social Development Organization found that Bombay Sweets, PRAN-RFL Group, and Abdul Monem Limited produced 67% of non-recyclable plastics in Bangladesh.

On 14 December 2020, Mr. Kamrul Hasan, Sanitary Inspector of Dhaka South City Corporation sued the Karim Sher Ali Jidani, managing director of Bombay Sweets, and Zahid Hossain, Production Manager of the Bombay Sweets factory in Dhaka, for obstructing him from performing an inspection at the factory.
