= Square Pharmaceuticals =

Bangladeshi pharmaceutical company

Square Pharmaceuticals Ltd.

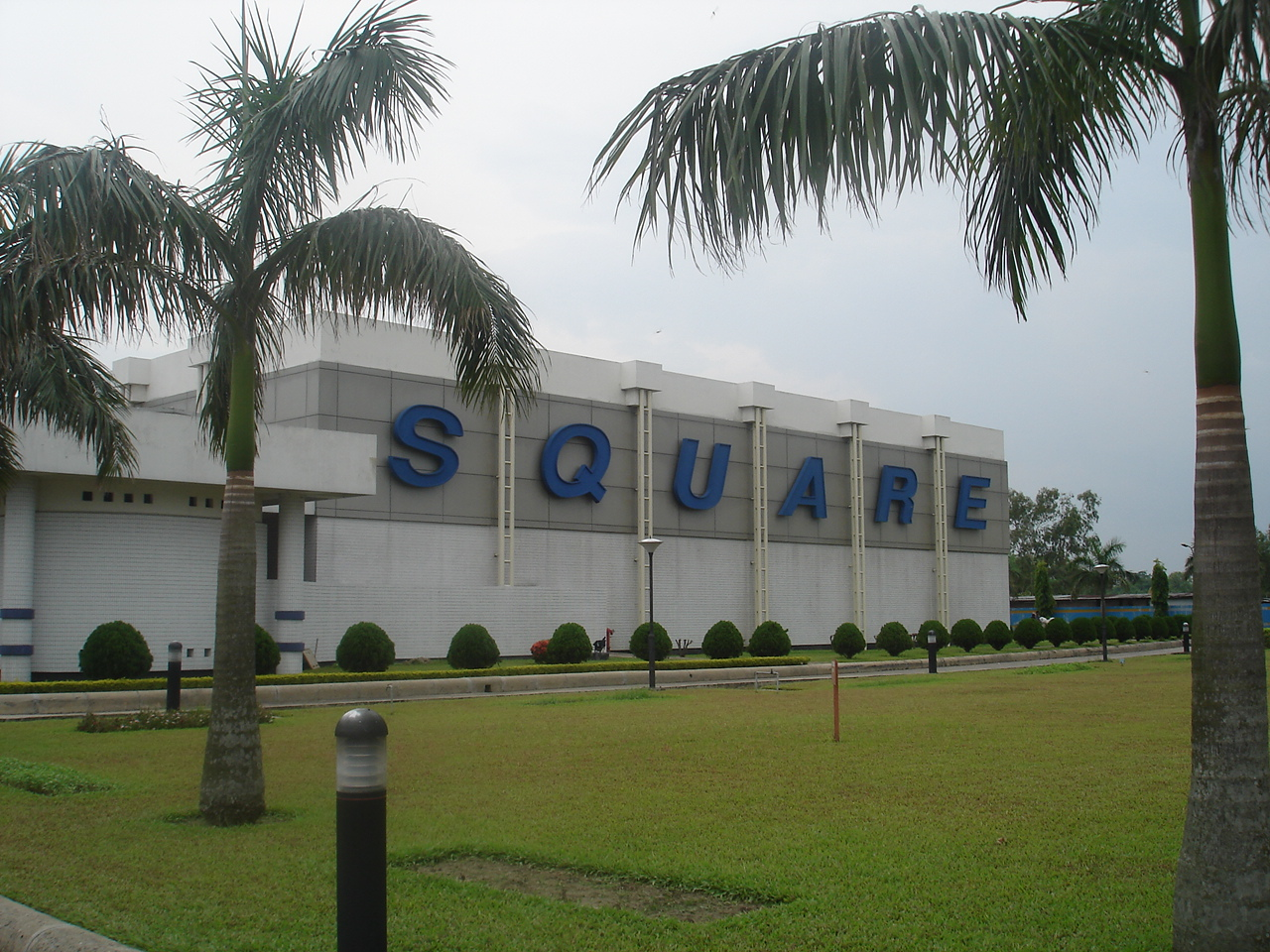
- Square Pharmaceuticals LTD. headquarters in Gazipur
- Type: Private
- Traded as: DSE: SQURPHARMA; CSE: SQURPHARMA
- Industry: Pharmaceutical
- Founded: 1958
- Founder: Samson H. Chowdhury
- Headquarters: Mohakhali, Dhaka, Bangladesh
- Area served: Asia, Africa, Europe, Central America, South America, Australia
- Key people: Tapan Chowdhury (CEO)
- Revenue: ▲US$528 million (2019)
- Operating income: ▲US$254 million (2019)
- Net income: ▲US$156 million (2019)
- Total assets: ▲US$1.18 billion (2019)
- Number of employees: 7390 (2016-17)
- Parent: Square Group
- Website: squarepharma.com.bd

Square Pharmaceuticals Ltd. is a Bangladeshi multinational pharmaceutical company. It was founded in 1958 by Samson H. Chowdhury along with three of his friends PK Saha, Kazi Harunur Roshid and Radhabinod Rai as a private firm.

As of 2024, Square pharmaceutical is the third largest company in Bangladesh by a market cap of $1.2 billion USD and first in pharmaceutical industry.

== History ==
Square pharma went public in 1991 and is listed on the Dhaka Stock Exchange and on the Chittagong Stock Exchange (ID of SPL: 13002) Square Pharmaceutical started to export different antibiotics and medicine across the world from 1987. Now it exports its medicine to 36 countries of the world.

In 2008 and 2009 it had the highest market share in the pharmaceutical industry of Bangladesh. For the last couple of years, it has been seeing double digit revenue every year. According to Forbes, Square Pharmaceuticals Ltd., a Bangladeshi company engaged in the pharmaceutical and chemical industries, reported sales of $512 million. The local pharma's market capital is $1.7 billion. Its net income is $150 million and has employed 9,240 people.
