= Square Toiletries =

Consumer goods company in Bangladesh

Square Toiletries Ltd.
- Type: Private
- Industry: Consumer goods
- Founded: 1994
- Headquarters: Mohakhali, Dhaka, Bangladesh
- Key people: Anjan Chowdhury Pintu (MD)
- Number of employees: 5001-10,000
- Website: squaretoiletries.com

Square Toiletries Ltd. is a fast-moving consumer goods (FMCG) company in Bangladesh and a subsidiary of Square Group. The company is marketing 20 brands in different segments like health and hygiene, oral care, hair care, fabric care, skin care etc. and producing more than 50 products. Major brands of the company are Jui, Chaka, Senora, Supermom, WhitePlus, Magic, Sepnil, Kool, Meril Protective Care and Meril Baby. Square is also exporting its finished products to 13 countries- UAE, Germany, UK, Australia, Malaysia etc.

== History ==
Square Toiletries Limited was founded in 1988 as a division of Square Group and was made into a separate private limited company in 1994.

== Specialties ==
Manufacturer of different cosmetic and toiletries product categories, cosmetic contract manufacturing and packaging, marketer of different cosmetic and toiletries product categories

== Major brands ==
- Jui
- Meril
- Meril Baby
- Supermom
- Revive
- Maya
- Chaka
- Chamak
- Senora
- Femina
- White Plus
- Magic
- Kool
- Xpel
- Spring
- Sepnil
- Zerocal
- Select Plus
- Shakti
- Rain Shower
- Maxclean
