= Samson H. Chowdhury =

Bangladeshi businessman

- স্যামসন এইচ চৌধুরী
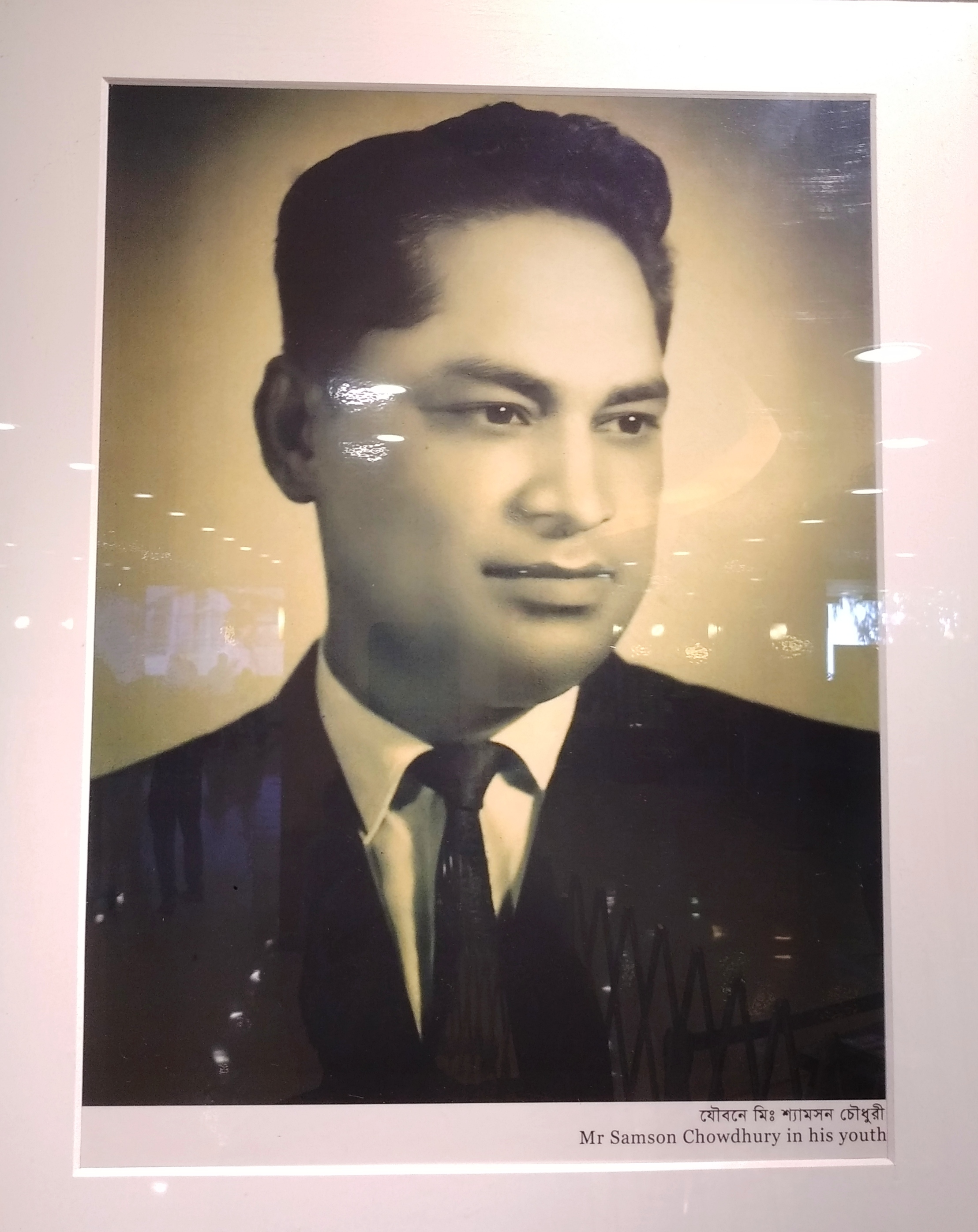
- Born: 25 September 1925; Gopalganj, British India
- Died: 5 January 2012 (aged 86); Singapore
- Education: Scottish Church College; Harvard University; University of Dhaka
- Occupation: Industrialist
- Years active: 1952–2012
- Spouse: Anita Biswas (married 1947–2012)
- Awards: Ekushey Padak (Social Service), 2013
- Website: www.samsonchowdhury.com

Samson H. Chowdhury (Bengali: স্যামসন এইচ চৌধুরী; 25 September 1925 – 5 January 2012) was a Bangladeshi business magnate. He was the chairman of Square Group.

== Personal life ==
Samson Hossain Chowdhury was born on 25 September 1925. at Aruakandi in Gopalganj. While Mr. Samson completed his studies he went to Mumbai and started his career as an employee of the Naval Recruiting Agency. In Second World War, he served in the Royal Navy. After completing education at the Scottish Church College in Kolkata, India, he returned to the then East Pakistan and settled at Ataikula village in Pabna District, where his father was working as a medical officer. Then he married Anita Biswas (Later Chowdhury) at the age of 22. In 1952, he started a small pharmacy in Ataikula village, which is about 160 km off capital Dhaka in the north-west part of Bangladesh. Chowdhury then ventured into a partnership pharmaceutical company with three of his friends in 1958. When asked why the name Square was chosen he remembers – "We named it SQUARE because it was started by four friends and also because it signifies accuracy and perfection meaning quality" as they committed in manufacturing quality.

He served as a vice president of the Baptist World Alliance from 1985 to 1990. In addition to being a BWA vice president, Chowdhury served in other areas of the global Baptist organization, including on the BWA general council, the executive committee, the Baptist World Aid Committee, the Promotion and Development Committee, and the Memorial Committee. Chowdhury was elected president of the Bangladesh Baptist Church Fellowship (BBCF) a dozen times, and was honorary general secretary for 14 years, between 1956 and 1969. He was a president of both the National Church Council of Bangladesh and the National Evangelical Alliance.

== Burial ==
Samson H Chowdhury was buried at ASTRAS, Khamar in Kashipur, Pabna.

== Positions ==
- Chairman, Square Group
- Chairman, Mutual Trust Bank board of directors
- Chairman, Astras Ltd.
- Honorary Member, Kurmitola Golf Club, Dhaka
- Former vice president, Baptist World Alliance, 1985-1990
- Former chairman, Micro Industries Development & Services (MIDAS)
- Chairman, Transparency International, Bangladesh Chapter, 2004–2007
- President, Metropolitan Chamber of Commerce & Industries, Dhaka in 1996 and 1997
- Vice-president: International Chamber of Commerce, Bangladesh
- Former director, The Federation of Bangladesh Chamber of Commerce & Industries (FBCCI)
- Member, Executive Committee of Bangladesh French Chamber of Commerce and Industry
- Director, Credit Rating Agency of Bangladesh
- Chairman, Central Depository Bangladesh Ltd
- Member, Advisory Committee of the Bangladesh Association of Pharmaceutical Industries
- Founder President, Bangladesh Association of Publicly Listed Companies
- Chairman, Masrangaa Television, Bangladesh

== See also ==
- List of Bangladeshi people#Entrepreneurs
- Personal website of Mr. Chowdhury
- Square Pharmaceuticals
