= List of Bangladeshi architects =

This list of Bangladeshi architects includes notable architects who were born in Bangladesh.

Name	Birth and death	Education	Firm/organization	Notable projects, awards and publications
Jalal Ahmad	Born 1959	Bachelor of Architecture, Bangladesh University of Engineering and Technology 1983	General secretary of Institute of Architects Bangladesh	Scholastica School at Dhaka and Savar; Training And Resource Center BRAC at Faridpur, Rangpur and Bogra; Dominic Residence, Tanzania
Kazi Khaleed Ashraf	Born 1959	Bachelor of Architecture, Bangladesh University of Engineering and Technology 1983; Masters from Massachusetts Institute of Technology; PhD from University of Pennsylvania	Assistant Professor, School of Architecture, University of Hawaii	Designing Dhaka: A Manifesto for a Better City (Loka Press, Dhaka, 2012); Made in India (AD, London, 2007); Sherebanglanagar: Louis Kahn and the Making of a Capital Complex (Loka Press, Dhaka, 2002); An Architecture of Independence: The Making of Modern South Asia (Architectural League of New York, New York, 1997); Pundranagar to Sherebanglanagar: Architecture in Bangladesh (Chetana, Dhaka, 1997); National Capital of Bangladesh (GA Edita, Tokyo, 1994)
Rafiq Azam	Born 29 December 1963, Dhaka, Bangladesh	Bachelor of Architecture, Bangladesh University of Engineering and Technology 1989	SHATOTTO - architecture for green living	Emirates Glass Leading European Architects’ Forum (LEAF) Award 2012; SA Residence, Cityscape Architecture Award 2009; Meghna Residence
Salauddin Ahmed	born 1967 in Dhaka, Bangladesh	Bachelor of Fine Arts in 1992 from Portland State University, Architecture degree in 1997 from the University of Pennsylvania	Atelier Robin Architects	Karim Residence; Cafe Mango
Kashef Mahboob Chowdhury		Bachelor of Architecture, Bangladesh University of Engineering and Technology 1995	URABANA; Visiting Faculty: North South University; BRAC University	Independence Monument, Suhrawardy Udyan, Dhaka, Bangladesh; Chandgaon Mosque, nominated for the Aga Khan Award for Architecture; Aga Khan Award for Architecture, for Friendship Center^{[24]} 2014-16 Cycle
Bashirul Haq	Born 1942 Brahmanbaria, Bangladesh Died 2020	Bachelor of Architecture, National College of Arts, Lahore, Pakistan 1964; Master's of Architecture, University of New Mexico, USA 1975	Principal, Bashirul Haq & Associates	Projects: Bhatshala House; Kalindi Apartments; Dhansiri Apartments; Chayanaut Bhaban; ASA Head Office Building; Publications: Battling the Storm - Study on Cyclone Resistance Housing, published by the German Red Cross, 1999
Mubasshar Hussain		Bachelor of Architecture, Bangladesh University of Engineering and Technology 1972	President, Institute of Architects Bangladesh; President, Commonwealth Association of Architects; Principal Architect, Assoconsult Ltd; Managing Director, Neer Limited	Grameen Bank Head Office Complex, Dhaka, Bangladesh; Proshika Head Office complex, Dhaka, Bangladesh
Saif Ul Haque	Born 1958	Bachelor of Architecture, Bangladesh University of Engineering and Technology	Principal, Saif Ul Haque Sthapati	Projects: BRAC Training Center at Faridpur, Bangladesh; Camp House for an Archaeological Team, Bogra, Bangladesh; IAB Award 2006; Govinda Gunalanker Hostel, Chittagong, Bangladesh; Banchte Shekha Training Center, Jessore, Bangladesh; Publications: Sherebanglanagar: Louis Kahn and the Making of a Capital Complex (Loka Press, Dhaka, 2002), co-author
Syed Mainul Hossain	Born 1952 in Munshiganj, Bangladesh Died 2014 in Dhaka, Bangladesh	Bachelor of Architecture, Bangladesh University of Engineering and Technology	-	Projects: Jatiyo Smriti Soudho; Bangladesh National Museum
Muzharul Islam	Born 25 December 1923, Murshidabad, British Raj Died 15 July 2012, Dhaka, Bangladesh	Bachelor of Science, Physics, University of Calcutta, British Raj 1942; Bachelor of Engineering, University of Calcutta, British Raj 1946; Bachelor of Architecture, University of Oregon, United States 1952; Post Graduate Certificate in Tropical Architecture, Architectural Association School of Architecture, London, UK 1957; Masters in Architecture, Yale University, USA 1961	Former President, Institute of Architects Bangladesh; Honorary Fellow, American Institute of Architects; Juror of First Aga Khan Award for Architecture, Geneva, 1980; Former President, Institute of Architects Pakistan	Projects: Faculty of Fine Arts, Shahbag, Dhaka, Bangladesh; Bangladesh National Archives and Library, Sher-e-Bangla Nagor, Dhaka, Bangladesh; National Institute of Public Administration Building, Shahbag, Dhaka, Bangladesh; Jahangirnagar University Master Plan and Designs, Dhaka, Bangladesh; Jaipurhat Limestone and cement Project, Jaipurhat, Bangladesh; World Bank Building, Sher-e-Bangla Nagor, Dhaka, Bangladesh; Awards: Independence Day Award in 1999, the highest state award of Bangladesh; Institute of Architects Bangladesh Gold Medal, 1993
Fazlur Rahman Khan	Born 3 April 1929, Dhaka, British Raj Died 27 March 1982, Jeddah, Saudi Arabia Resting place Chicago, Illinois, USA	Bachelor of Civil Engineering, Ahsanullah Engineering College, University of Dhaka, (now Bangladesh University of Engineering and Technology); Master's degree on Structural Engineering, University of Illinois at Urbana–Champaign; Master's degree on Theoretical and applied mechanics, University of Illinois at Urbana–Champaign; PhD in Structural Engineering, University of Illinois at Urbana-Champaign	Skidmore, Owings and Merrill	John Hancock Center, Chicago, 1965–1969; One Shell Square, New Orleans, Louisiana, 1972; 140 William Street (formerly BHP House), Melbourne, 1972; Sears Tower, Chicago, 1970–1973; U.S. Bank Center, Milwaukee, 1973; King Abdulaziz University, Jeddah, 1977–1978; Hubert H. Humphrey Metrodome, Minneapolis, Minnesota, 1982; One Magnificent Mile, Chicago, completed 1983; Onterie Center, Chicago, completed 1986; United States Air Force Academy, Colorado Springs, Colorado
Ehsan Khan	Born 1964 Bangladesh	Bachelor of Architecture, Bangladesh University of Engineering and Technology		Mausoleum of Bangabandhu; Aga Khan Award for Architecture, 2010; nominated
Enamul Karim Nirjhar	Born 1962 in Rajshahi, Bangladesh	Bachelor of Architecture, Bangladesh University of Engineering and Technology	Principal architect and CEO, System Architects	Projects: British American Tobacco Corporate Headquarters; Ninakabbo Epyllion Holdings; Shudha Sadan; Shakha-Proshakha (residence of Faridur Reza Sagar); Voot Restaurant; WE - The Restaurant (Hampshire, UK); Fera (residence); Epyllion Style Industry; Awards: AYA JK Cement Architect of the Year Award (2005); Berger Commendation Award for Excellence in Architecture (Ninakabbo); IAB award
Yafes Osman	Born 1 May 1946, Chittagong, Bangladesh	Bachelor of Architecture, Bangladesh University of Engineering and Technology	Former Secretary of Institute of Architects Bangladesh; Former Architect, Housing & Settlement Department, Government of Bangladesh; Managing Director, Prakalpa Upadeshta Ltd	
Mustapha Khalid Palash	Born 1963 in Dhaka, Bangladesh	Bachelor of Architecture, Bangladesh University of Engineering and Technology, 1988	Managing Director, Vistaara Architects Pvt Ltd; Former assistant professor, Bangladesh University of Engineering and Technology; Visiting faculty: University of Asia Pacific; North South University; BRAC University	Projects: Grameenphone Corporate Headquarters; Bashundhara City; Unique Trade Centre (UTC); Bashundhara Convention Center; Radisson Bay View Hotel Chittagong; Hilton Dhaka; The Westin Dhaka Hotel; Awards: Berger Commendation Award for Excellence in Architecture (Grameenphone House), 2011; Institute of Architects Bangladesh (IAB) Design Award 1998; Holcim Green Built Bangladesh Award, 2010; Berger Award for Excellence in Architecture, 2007
Marina Tabassum	Born 1970 in Dhaka, Bangladesh	Bachelor of Architecture, Bangladesh University of Engineering and Technology, 1994	In 1995 Tabassum founded URBANA with Kashef Mahboob Chowdhury; Marina Tabassum Architects; Director of Academic Program at Bengal Institute for Architecture, Landscapes and Settlements since 2015; Visiting faculty: University of Asia Pacific; BRAC University	Projects: J.A. Naser Residence. North Avenue Gulshan. Dhaka. Completed in September 2001; Anjuman. Block E. Lalmatia. Dhaka. Bangladesh. Completed in June 2001; BEN Bangladesh ltd. Factory Building at DEPZ Dhaka Completed in September 2001; Liberation War Museum and Independence Monument. Suhrawardy Udyan. Dhaka.; A-5, Architects residence. Lalmatia. Dhaka. Completed in February 2002; Exhibition Design and Execution on the Birth Centenary of Loius I Kahn; Baitur Rauf Jame Mosque, Dhaka.; Awards: Aga Khan Award for Architecture (2016) for Baitur Rauf Jame Mosque.; Second runner-up of Nishorgo Architectural Competition (2006); Finalist of Aga Khan Award for A5, a pavilion apartment (2004); Anannya Top Ten Awards (2004); Architect of the Year Award, by the Indian Vice President Bhairon Singh Shekhawat (2001); First prize for The Independence Monument and The Liberation War Museum by the Bangladeshi Prime Minister Sheikh Hasina (1997)
Shamsul Wares	Born 1946 in Bangladesh	Bachelor of Architecture, Bangladesh University of Engineering and Technology	An architectural consultant at Shisrikkhu Sthapati; Faculty: Bangladesh University of Engineering and Technology from 1995 to 2003; University of Asia Pacific from 2003 to 2015	Projects: University of Asia Pacific - UAP (City Campus); Vacation House, Vurulia, Gazipur, Bangladesh.; Awards: IAB Gold Medal (2017)

== See also ==
- Architecture of Bangladesh
- Institute of Architects Bangladesh
- National Parliament Building
- List of Bangladeshi people
