= Jalal Ahmad =

Bangladeshi architect

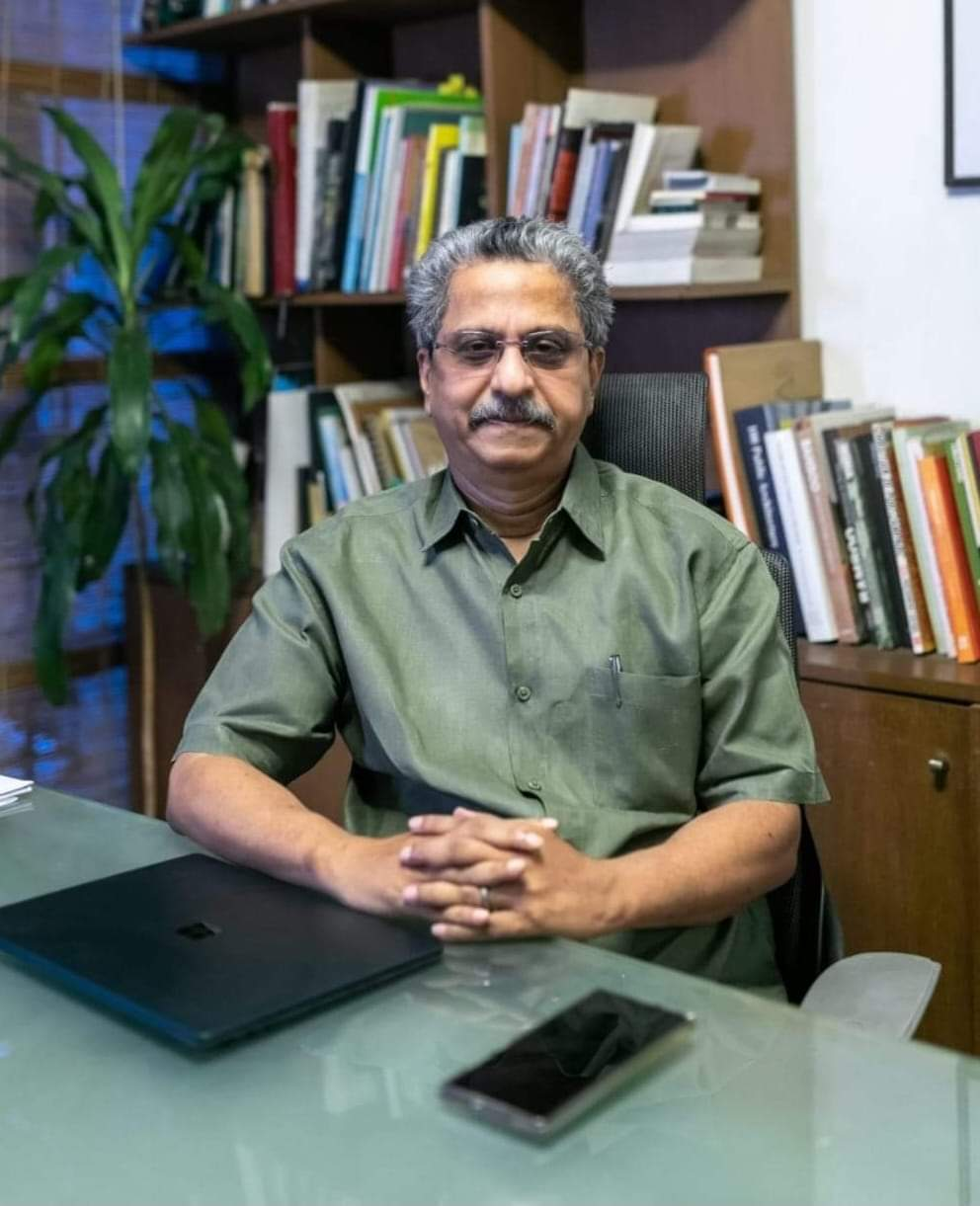
- Jalal Ahmad
- Born: 1959 (age 66–67); Sylhet, Bangladesh
- Education: Bangladesh University of Engineering and Technology
- Occupation: Architect
- Awards: IAB Award
- Practice: J. A. Architects Ltd.
- Buildings: Scholastica School; Training And Resource Center BRAC

Jalal Ahmad (Bengali: জালাল আহমদ) is a practicing Bangladeshi architect. He is the former president of the Institute of Architects Bangladesh and the vice president of Commonwealth Association of Architects.

== Career ==
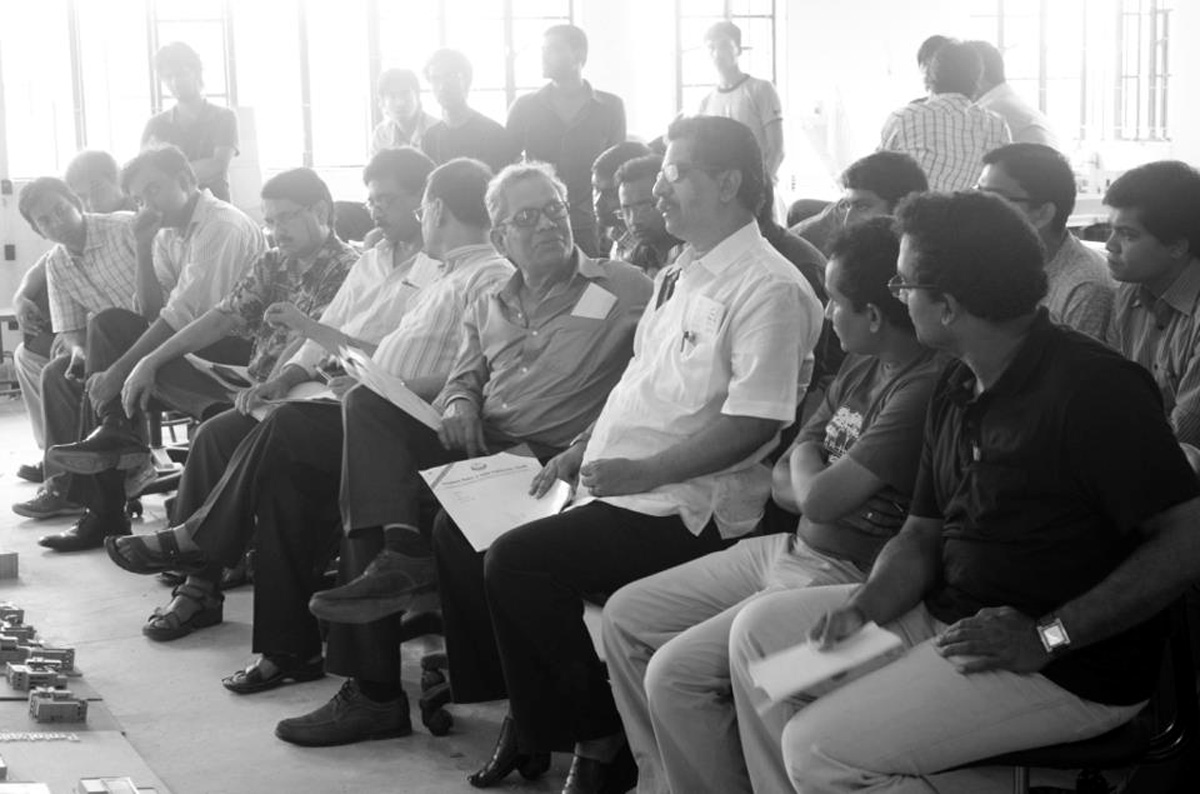
Jalal(3rd from right) at Architecture, SUST jury session

Ahmad was born in 1959, Sylhet. He completed his bachelor of architecture from Bangladesh University of Engineering and Technology and established Diagram Architects in 1983 with two other partners. Later he started his own architectural farm J. A. Architects in 1997. He won the North South University Campus International Design Competition (2002) and Mujib Nagar Memorial Open Design Competition (1984). He is a founding member of the architectural research group CHETANA, established in 1983.

== Notable works ==
- Scholastica school at Dhaka and Savar
- Training And Resource Center, BRAC at Faridpur, Rangpur and Bogra
- Dominic Residence, Tanzania

== Awards ==
- IAB Architect of the Year Award (2016)
- ARCASIA Award for Architecture (2018)
