= Bashirul Haq =

Bangladeshi architect (1942–2020)

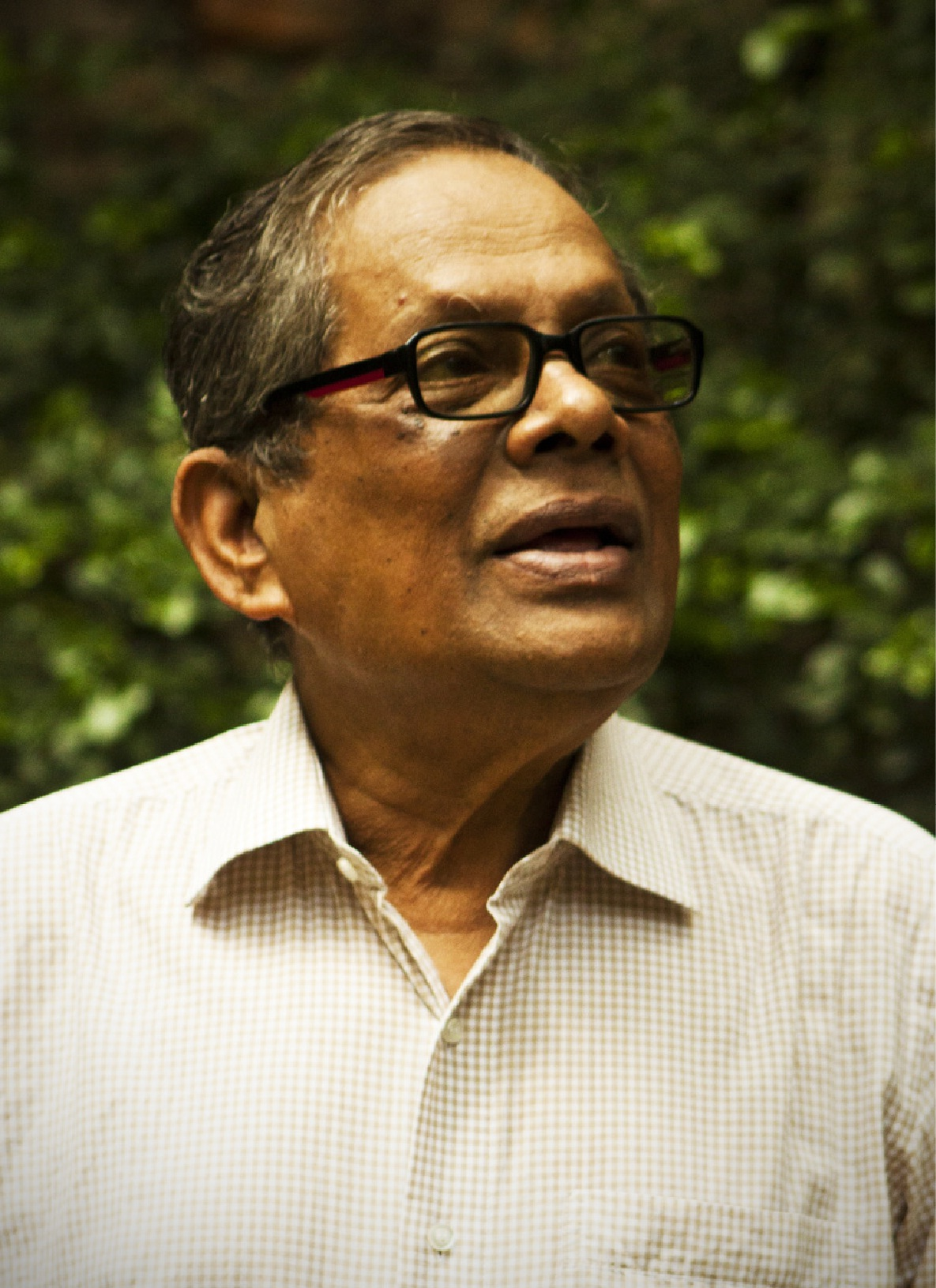
- Haq at studio
- Born: 24 June 1942; Brahmanbaria, Bengal Presidency, British India
- Died: 4 April 2020 (aged 77)
- Education: National College of Arts; University of New Mexico
- Occupations: Architect, planner, educator
- Awards: IAB Gold Medal; Aga Khan Award for Architecture Three times nominated
- Practice: Bashirul Haq and Associates
- Buildings: Bhatshala House; Kalindi Apartments; Chayanaut Bhaban; ASA Head Office Building
- Website: bashirulhaq.com

Bashirul Haq (24 June 1942 – 4 April 2020) was a Bangladeshi architect, town planner and visiting professor of MIT. He was regarded as one of the most influential architects in South Asia in terms of environmentally and socially responsive design.

== Early life ==
Haq was born in Brahmanbaria (now a district of Bangladesh). His father was a deputy collector from the Sylhet district and for that reason, Haq spent the majority of his childhood there. He completed his Bachelor of Architecture from the National College of Arts, in Lahore, Pakistan in 1964. He received John Heinrich Tuition, Scholarship and Teaching Assistantship at University of New Mexico, United States in 1971 and completed his master's in architecture from the university in 1975.

== Career ==
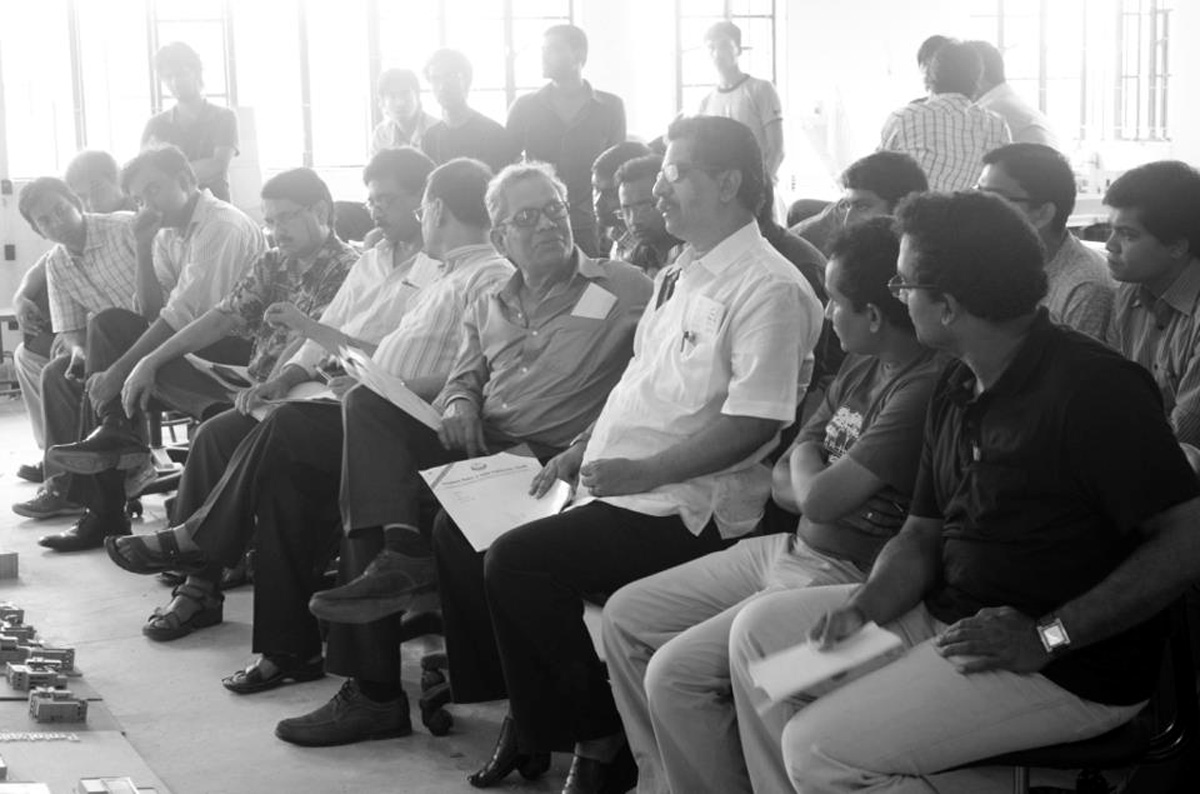
Haq (4th from right) at SUST jury session

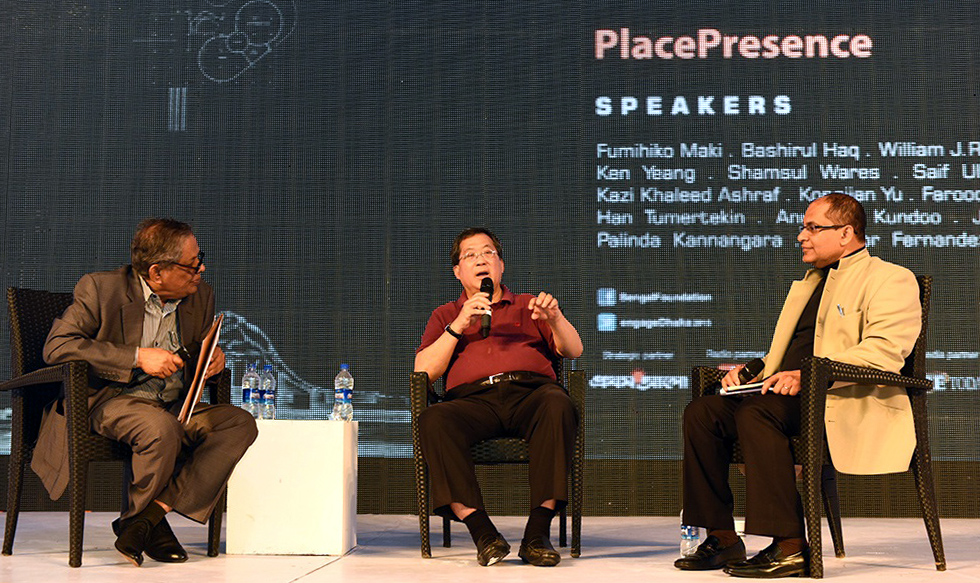
From left; Haq, Ken Yeang and Kazi Ashraf

After completing his master's degree, Haq started working for the firm Kallmann McKinnell. He was interested in returning to his homeland. However, another Bangladeshi-American engineer, Fazlur Rahman Khan, discouraged him from returning to Bangladesh citing a newly independent war devastated nation. Khan, who was then the partner of SOM instead interviewed and advised Haq to join there. Khan suggested he visit Europe and return to the United States. But Haq flew to Bangladesh from Europe and started practicing architecture. He established Bashirul Haq & Associates in 1977. After several years of not visiting the United States, in 1989, he visited Massachusetts Institute of Technology as an invited visiting professor of design.

In his 46 years of professional career, Haq has designed more than 300 buildings. According to Haq, the works of Alvar Aalto and Aldo Rossi inspired him most.

Architectural works
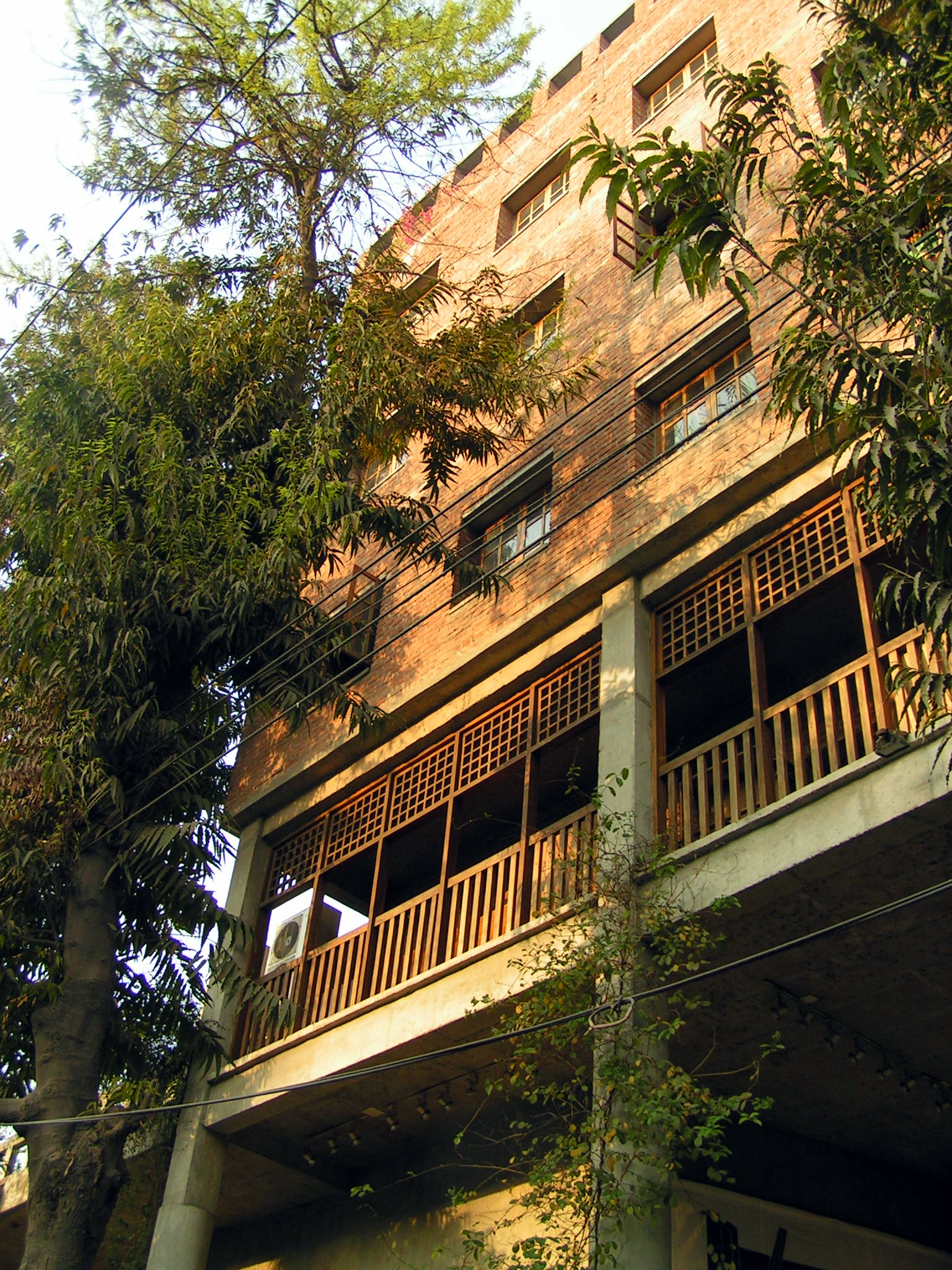
Chhayanaut, Dhaka

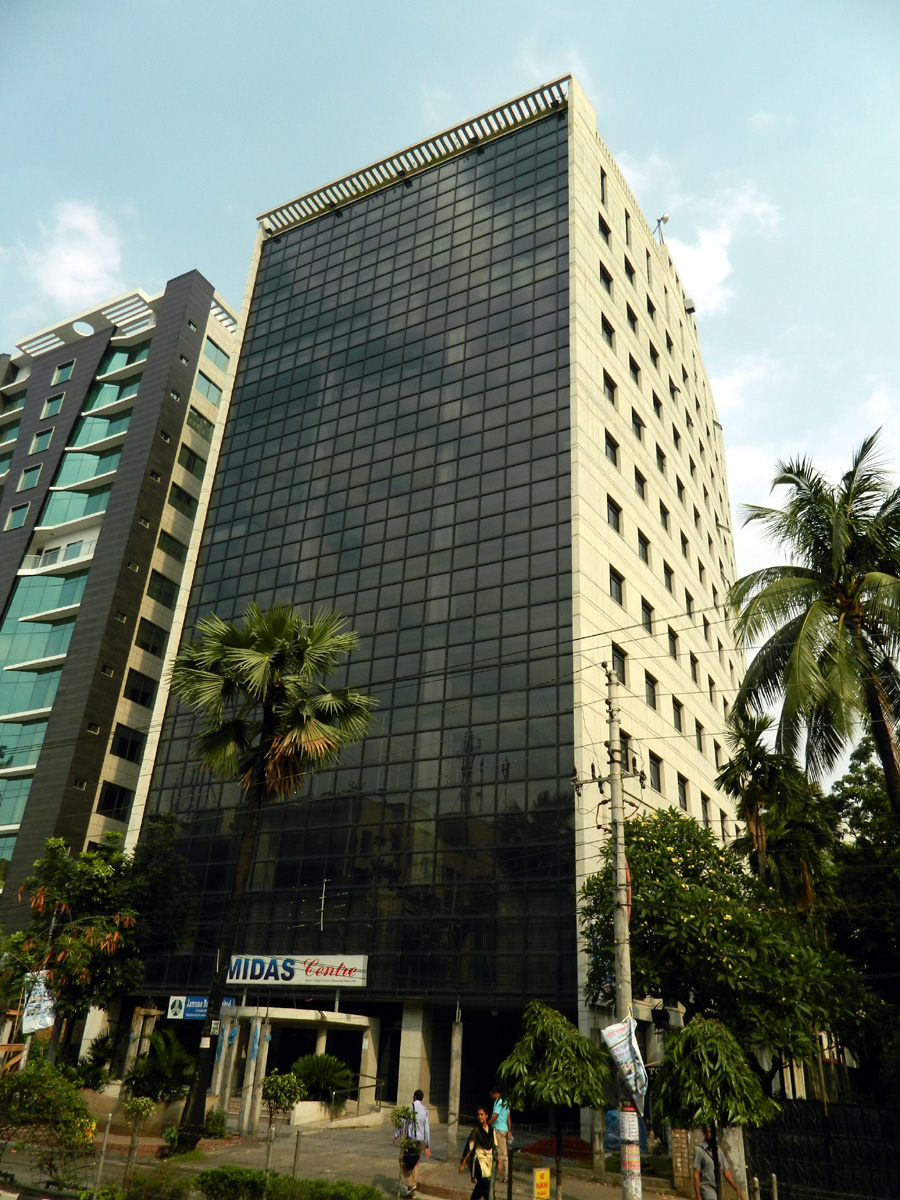
MIDAS Tower, Dhanmondi, Dhaka

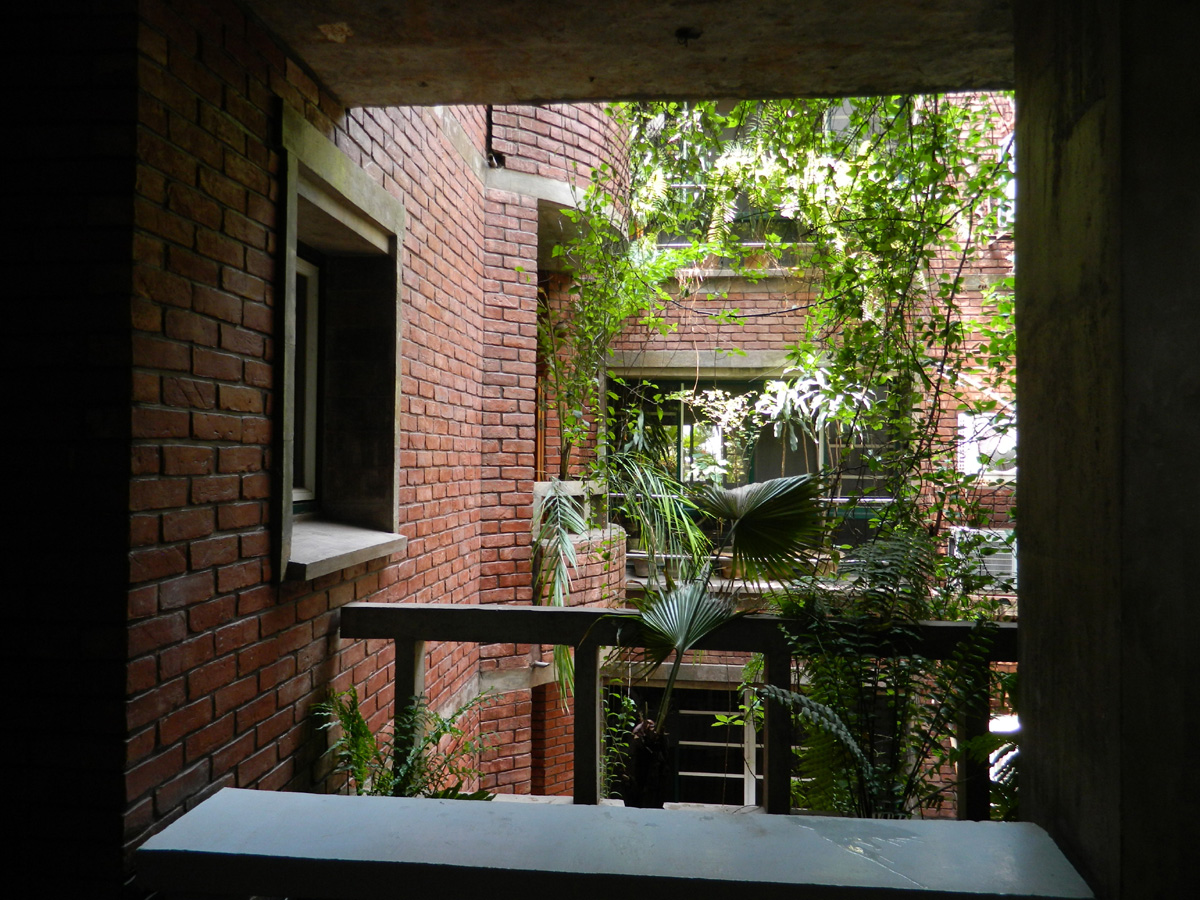
Asra Apartments, Dhanmondi, Dhaka

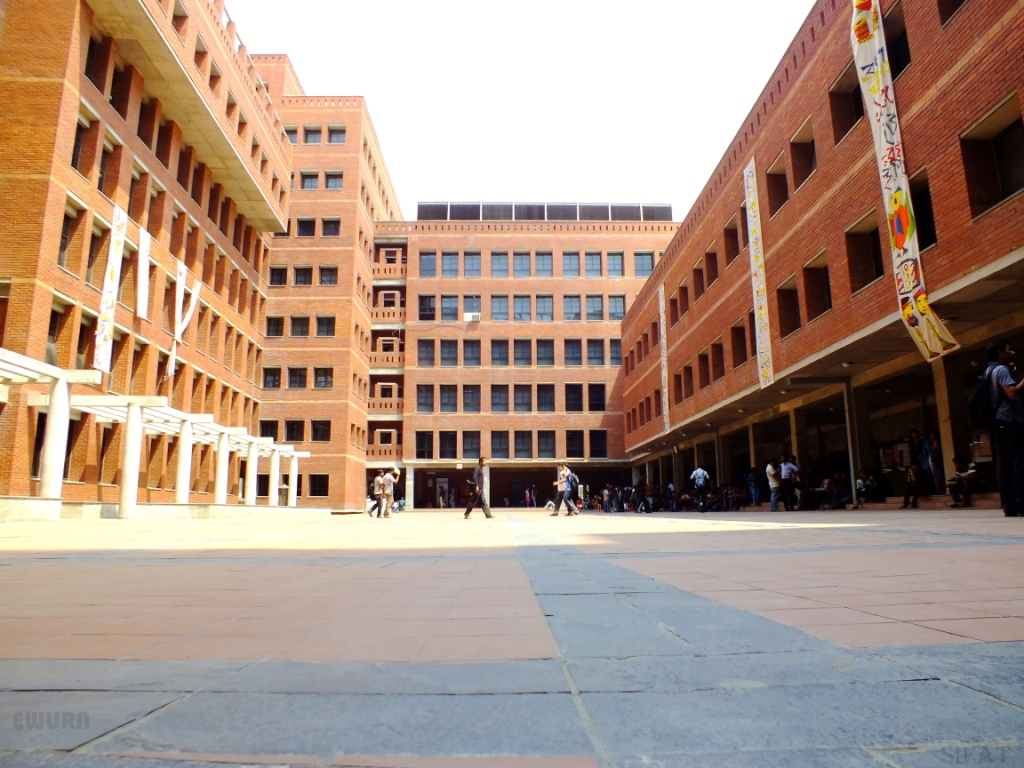
East West University, Dhaka

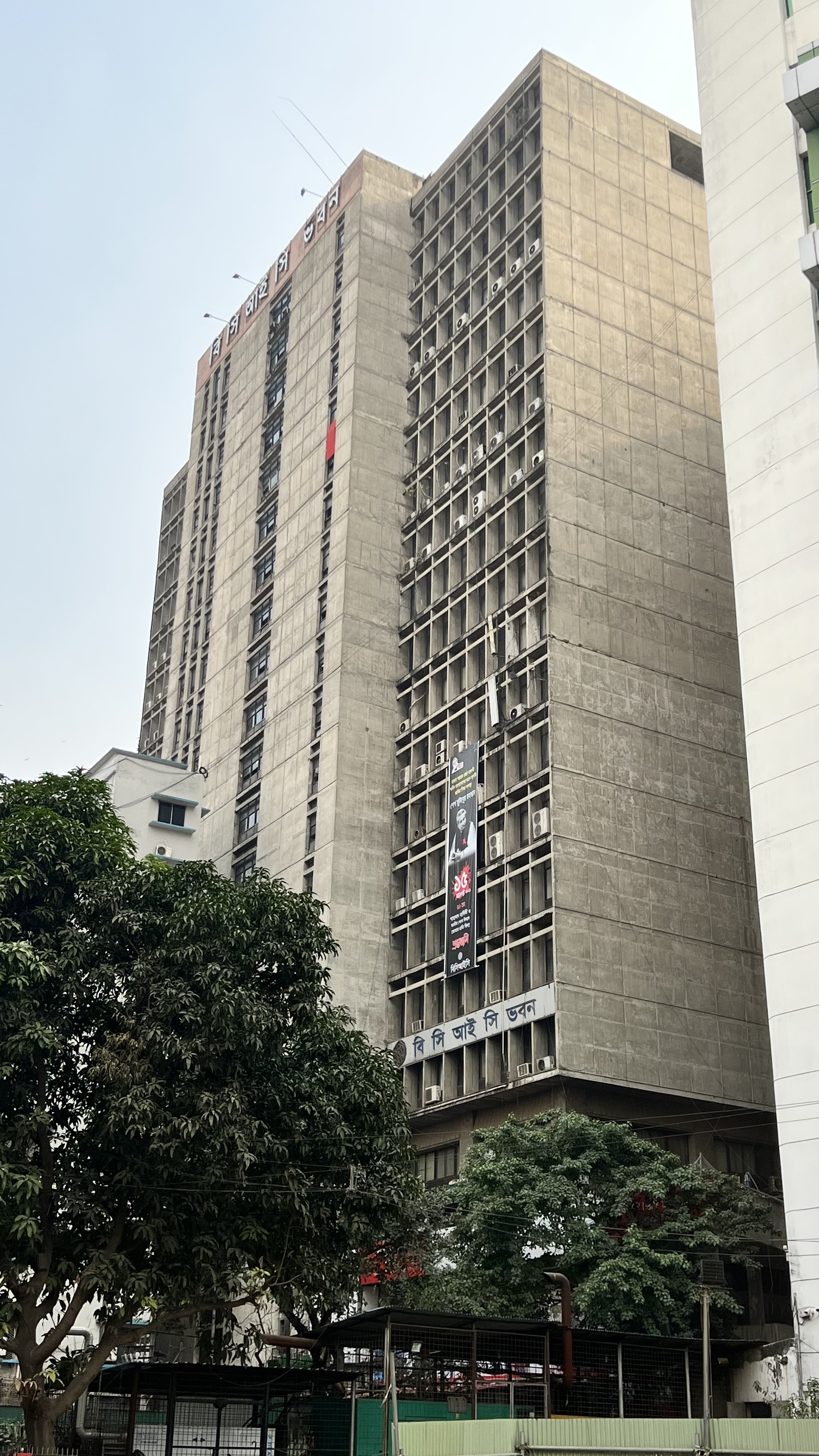
Bangladesh Chemical Industries Corporation Building, Dhaka

== Selected works ==
=== Residential ===
- Architect's Family Home and Studio, Indira Road, Dhaka
- Bhatshala House (Architect's village home), Brahmanbaria
- Ramna Apartment Complex, Moghbazar, Dhaka
- Century Apartment Complex, Moghbazar, Dhaka
- Century Tower, Moghbazar, Dhaka
- Lake View Apartment Complex, Dhanmondi, Dhaka
- Segunbagicha Apartment Complex, Segunbagicha, Dhaka
- Kalindi Apartment Complex, 36 Indira Road, Dhaka
- Gulshan Pride, Gulshan, Dhaka
- Dhanshiri Apartment Complex, 35 Indira Road, Dhaka
- Asra Apartments, Dhanmondi, Dhaka

=== Office ===
- 20-storied Association for Social Advancement (ASA) Head Office Building
- 20-storied Head Office Building of Bangladesh Chemical Industries Corporation (BCIC), Dilkusha C/A., Dhaka
- 20-storied Head Office Building of People's Insurance Company Ltd. (PICL), Dilkusha C/A., Dhaka
- Projects under Cyclone Related Disaster Preparedness Programme
- Community Development Centre at Kutubdia, Moghnama and Moheshkhali and Cox's Bazar
- German Red Cross Community Based Multipurpose Cyclone Shelters at Tolatoli, Kachubunia and Khandkar Para, Teknaf, Cox's Bazar
- Cyclone resistant Housing in 6 Locations at Cox's Bazar district
- MIDAS Center, Dhanmondi, Dhaka

=== Physical planning ===
- Physical planning of three upazilas under Kishoreganj Distriction, namely Katiadi, Kuliarchar and Bajitpur
- Physical planning of three upazilas under Faridpur District, namely Nagarkanda, Alphadanga and Charvadrashan
- Physical planning of Faridpur District

=== Institutes ===
- Facilities for American International and Secondary School, Baridhara, Dhaka
- Hostel cum-Seminar Facilities Hosted People's Health Assembly
- Shabuj Shona Center, Manikgonj
- Training Center for Nijerakori, Bogra
- Chhayanaut Bhaban, Dhanmondi, Dhaka
- Sunbeams School, Uttara, Dhaka
- East West University, Dhaka
- Drik-Pathshala, Panthapath, Dhaka

=== Consultancy ===
- Central Diesel Workshop and Housing Project for Bangladesh Railway
- US Chancery Building, Dhaka. Kallmann McKinnell & Wood, United States
- Rail II Project for Bangladesh Railway. Dhaka, Parbatipur, Pahartali, Ishurdi. International Rail Consultant, Canada
- GMP Standard Factory Design at Tongi for Beximco Pharmaceutical Ltd. Tongi. CMPS&F Pty Ltd. (Egis Group), Australia

== Awards and honors ==
- Aga Khan Award for Architecture, shortlisted in 1980, 1992 and 2001
- Member, Board of Trustees, Fazlur Rahman Khan Foundation, Dhaka
- Became part of an International Exhibit Entitled 5000 years of Pakistan
- Chairman of the jury board, Holcim Green Built Bangladesh Award
- Works exhibition at Swiss Architecture Museum in Basel, Switzerland; 2017
- Works exhibition at "Bengal Stream: The Vibrant Architecture Scene of Bangladesh" in Basel, Switzerland in 2017, and later on in Bordeaux, France in 2018 and in Frankfurt, Germany in 2019

== Publications ==
- 1994 "Battling the Storm – Study on Cyclone Resistance Housing". Published by the German Red Cross, 1999.
- Bashirul Haq: Architect. Monograph edited by Iftekhar Ahmed and Sheikh Rubaiya Sultana, was published in 2019 by Copal Publishing with the Department of Architecture of BRAC University.

== See also ==
- Muzharul Islam
- B.V. Doshi
- Charles Correa
- Raj Rewal
