= Institute of Architects Bangladesh =

- বাংলাদেশ স্থপতি ইনস্টিটিউট; Bānglādēsh Sthāpāti Institute
- Emblem of Institute of Architects Bangladesh

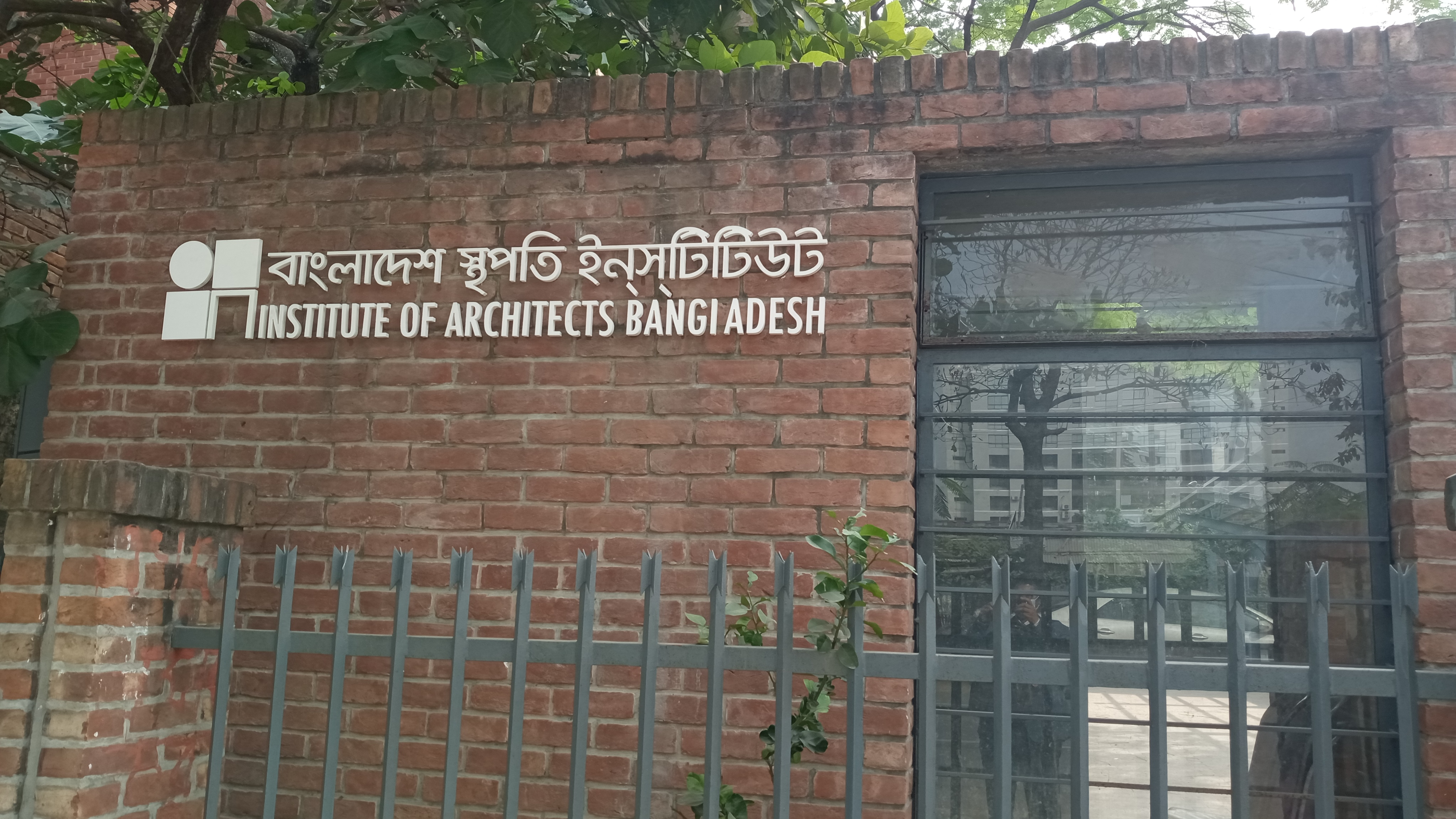
- IAB HQ, Agargaon, Dhaka
- Abbreviation: IAB
- Formation: 1972; 54 years ago
- Type: Professional organization
- Headquarters: IAB Centre, Sher-E-Bangla Nagar, Dhaka
- Region served: Bangladesh
- Members: 5,000+
- Affiliations: BUET; MIST; SUST; KU; CUET; DUET; AIUB; AUST; DIU; UAP; BRACU; NSU; BU; SUB; Stamford University Bangladesh; Southeast University (Bangladesh); Leading University; Ministry of Education; UGC (Bangladesh)
- Website: iab.org.bd

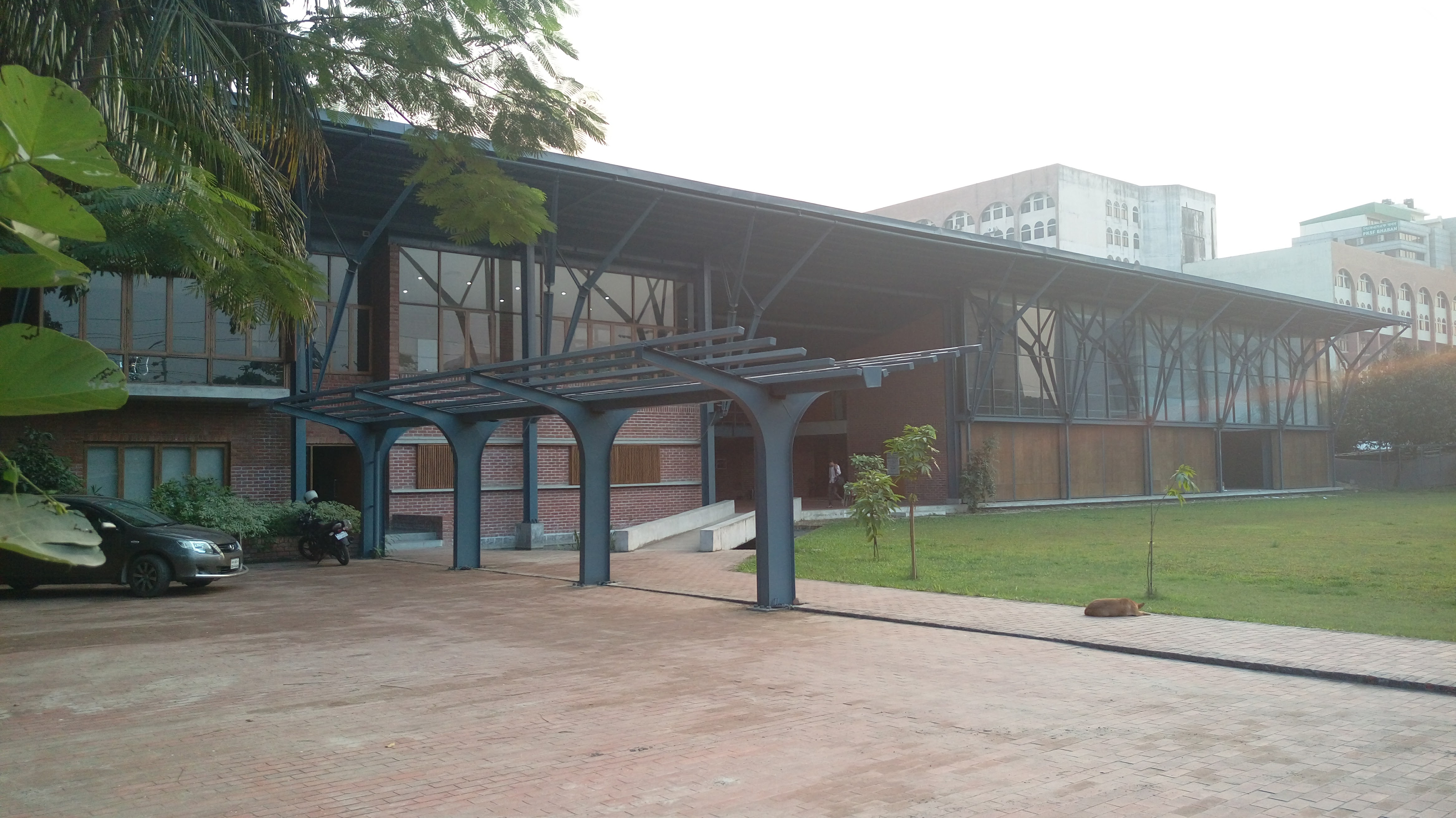
IAB Building, Agargaon, Dhaka

The Institute of Architects Bangladesh (IAB) (Bengali: বাংলাদেশ স্থপতি ইন্‌স্‌টিটিউট, Bānglādēsh Sthāpāti Institute) is a professional organization for architects in Bangladesh. It was founded by the Bangladeshi architect Muzharul Islam. The organization works with different government organizations to offer educational services and advocates to improve the quality of the architecture profession in Bangladesh.

New houses and buildings to be built in Bangladesh must be designed by member architects of this organization.

== History ==
The Institute of Architects Bangladesh (IAB) was founded in Dhaka on 25 February 1972. After the Bangladesh Liberation War, the IAB was formed soon after the war ended to support the development of Bangladesh and rebuild the country after the war.

== Organization ==
=== Membership ===
More than 5,000 licensed architects are members of IAB.

There are three levels of membership in the IAB depending on professional experience.

- Associate Member, AMIAB
- Member, MIAB
- Fellow, FIAB (Member with minimum 20 years experience)

There have another category for students as Student Member.

=== Presidents ===
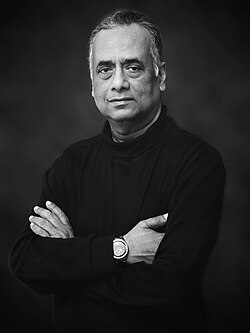
Abu Sayeed M Ahmed: President of IAB

- Muzharul Islam
- S.H.M.A Bashar
- M.A. Muktadir
- Shah Alam Zahiruddin
- Mahbub Haque
- Rabiul Husain
- Shamsul Wares
- Khadem Ali
- Mubasshar Hussein
- Abu Sayeed M Ahmed
- Kazi Golam Nasir
- Jalal Ahmad
- Khandaker Shabbir Ahmed
- Abu Sayeed Mostaque Ahmed (present)

=== General secretaries ===
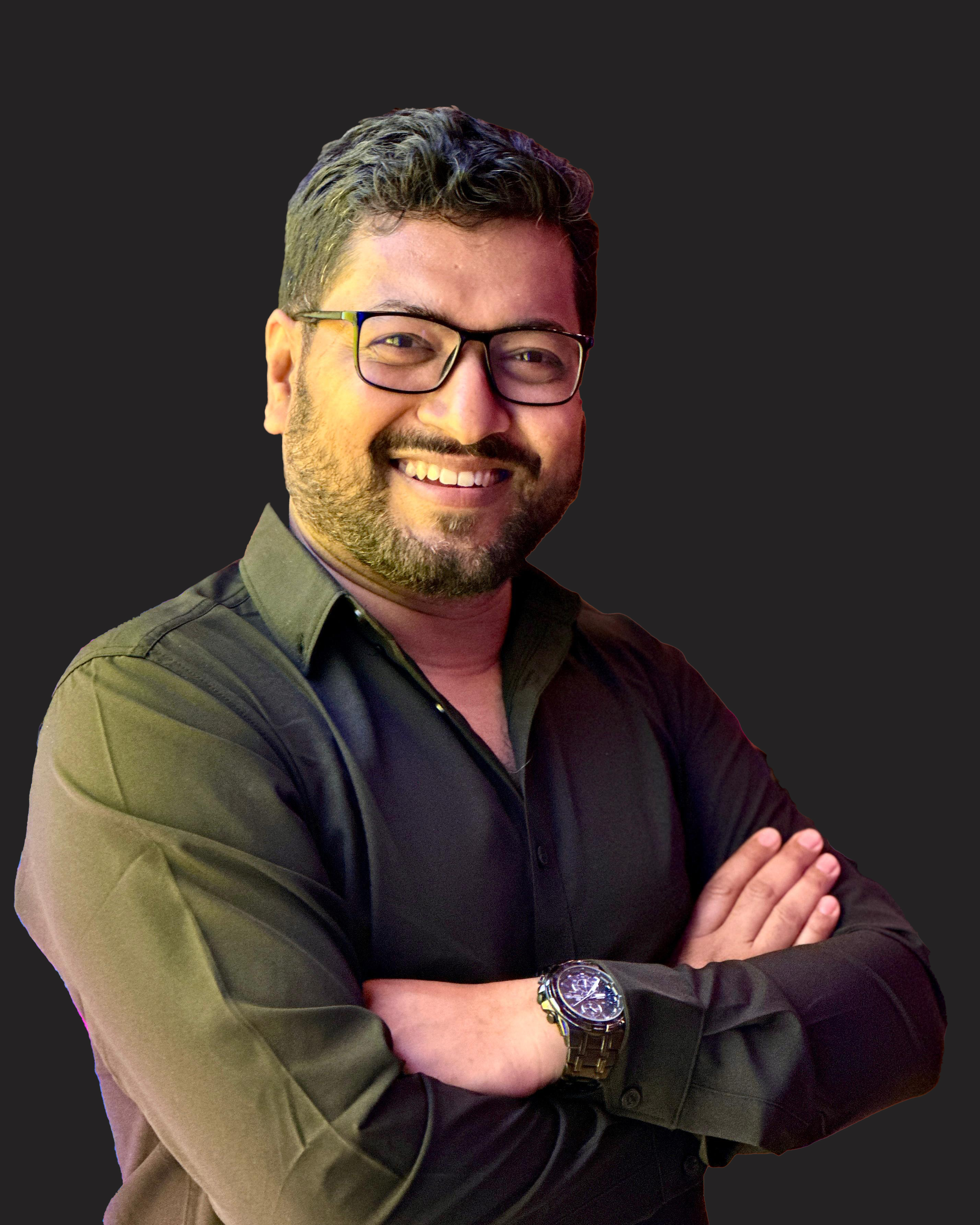
Masud Ur Rashid:General Secretary of IAB

- Yeafesh Osman (1972-1974, 1974-1976)
- Shamsul Wares (1976-1978, 1993-1995)
- Md. Habibur Rahman (1978-1980)
- Abdus Salam (1980-1982)
- A K M Nuruzzaman (1982-1985)
- Haroon Ur Rashid (1985-1988, 1990-1993)
- Abu H. Imamuddin (1988-1990)
- Anwarul Azam Khan (1995-1997)
- A S M Ismail (1997-1999, 1999-2001, 2001-2003)
- Md. Sanaul Huq (2003-2005)
- Md. Mahbubur Rahman (2005-2007)
- Kazi Golam Nasir (2008-2009, 2009-2010)
- Jalal Ahmed (2011-2013, 2013-2014)
- Qazi M Arif (2015-2016, 2017-2018)
- Nowajish Mahbub (2019-2020)
- Farhana Sharmin Emu (2021-2022)
- Nabi Newaz Khan (2023-2024)
- Masud Ur Rashid (2025-2026)

== 26th Executive Council (2025-2026) ==
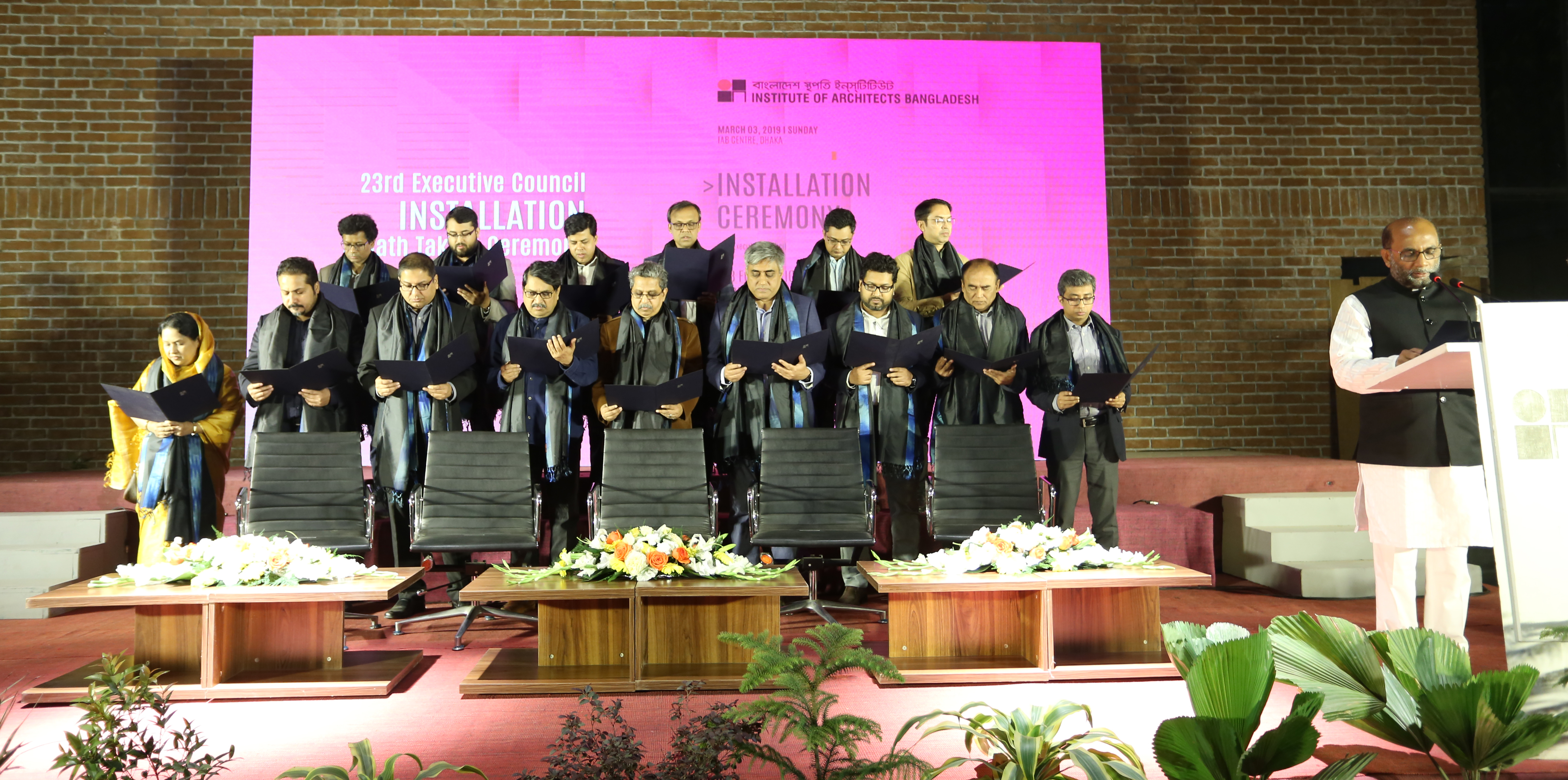
Oath Taking Ceremony of 23rd Executive Council

01. Abu Sayeed Mostaque Ahmed (President )

02. Nowajish Mahbub (Vice-President, National Affairs)

03. Khan Md. Mahfuzul Huq (Vice-President, International Relations)

04. Masud Ur Rashid (General Secretary)

05. Md. Nawrose Fatemi (Assistant General Secretary)

06. Chowdhury Saiduzzaman (Treasurer)

07. Md. Maruf Hossain (Secretary, Education)

08. M Wahid Asif (Secretary, Profession)

09. Ahsanul Haque Rubel (Secretary, Membership)

10. Md. Shafiul Azam Shamim (Secretary, Publication & Publicity)

11. Saida Akter (Secretary, Seminar & Convention)

12. Kazi Shamima Sharmin (Secretary, Heritage & Culture)

13. Khurshid Zabin Hossain Taufique (Secretary, Environment & Urbanization)

14. Fazle Imran Chowdhury (Chairman, Chittagong Chapter)

15. Faria Latif (Chairman, Canada Chapter)

16. Khandaker Shabbir Ahmed (Immediate Past President)

== Accredited universities ==
The following universities in Bangladesh currently have Bachelor of Architecture (B.Arch) programs accredited by the Institute of Architects Bangladesh (IAB):

- Bangladesh University of Engineering and Technology (BUET)
- Khulna University (KU)
- Ahsanullah University of Science and Technology (AUST)
- University of Asia Pacific (UAP)
- BRAC University
- North South University (NSU)
- Shahjalal University of Science and Technology (SUST)
- American International University-Bangladesh (AIUB)
- Southeast University (SEU)
- Stamford University Bangladesh
- State University of Bangladesh
- Leading University
- Bangladesh University
- Daffodil International University (DIU)
- Chittagong University of Engineering and Technology (CUET)
- Military Institute of Science and Technology (MIST)
- Dhaka University of Engineering & Technology (DUET)

== International affiliations ==
- UIA : Union of International Architects
- CAA : Commonwealth Association of Architects
- ARCASIA: Architects Regional Council for ASIA
- SAARCH : South Asian Association for Regional Cooperation of Architects

== See also ==
- Architecture of Bangladesh
- List of Bangladeshi architects
