= Proshika =

Organisation based in Bangladesh

- Founded: 1976
- Purpose: Economic self-reliance
- Location: Bangladesh
- Method: Training, technical assistance, micro-credit, literacy, advocacy
- Website: www.proshika.org

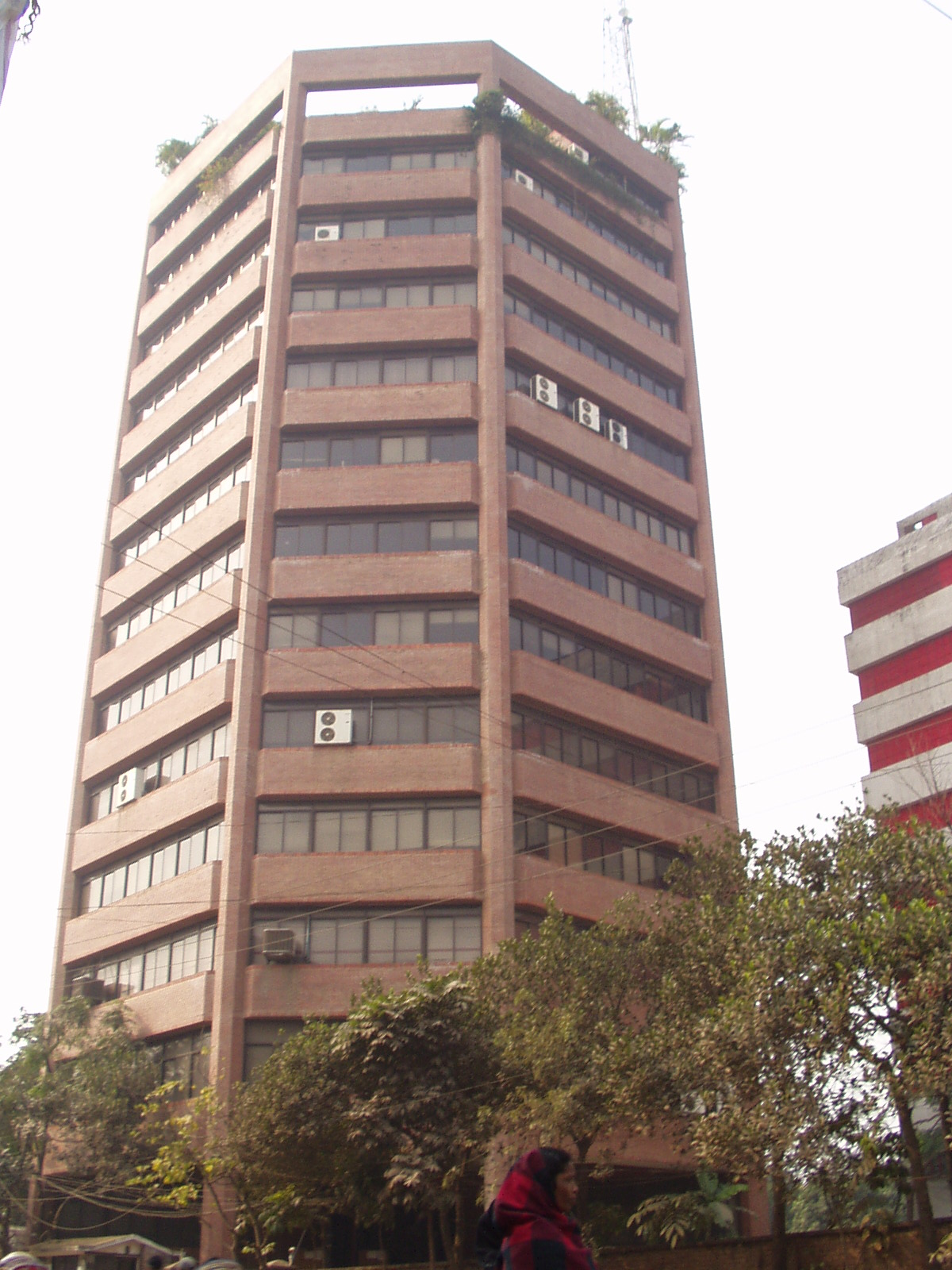
Proshika building, Mirpur

Proshika (Proshika Centre for Human Development) is a Bangladesh-based organization. It was founded in 1976 by Dr. Qazi Faruque Ahmed. Proshika promotes self-reliance among the poor through a network of local organizations. Major emphasis is placed on Micro-finance, agriculture, forestry, health education, disaster management, advocacy, and literacy. 12 million people have been trained by Proshika.

== History ==
Dr. Qazi Faruque Ahmed established Proshika in 1977 to train, educate, promote micro-finance to improve economy and increase social empowerment. Muhammad Yahiya, one of the founders of Proshika, later left the NGO to establish Centre for Development Innovation and Practices. The name comes from the Bengali words for training (proshikkhan), education (shikkha), and work (kaj). Its headquarters in Mirpur were designed by Mubasshar Hussain. The NGO had a 30-member general body which elects a nine-member governing body.

On 19 April 2004, Bangladesh Jatiotabadi Jubo Dal, the youth wing of the Bangladesh Nationalist Party, laid siege to Proshika headquarters demanding that the government cancel their NGO registration. They were led by S. A. Khaleque, the local member of parliament and Ahsanullah Hassan, Mirpur Ward six Commissioner. The next day workers of Proshika were arrested.

Empowerment through Law of the Common People organized a Human Rights school for law school students from Bangladesh, India, and Nepal at the Proshika HRDC, Koitta, Manikganj District.
