= Shamsul Wares =

- Born: January 21, 1946 (age 80)
- Education: Bachelor of Architecture
- Alma mater: Bangladesh University of Engineering and Technology
- Occupation: Architect
- Organization: State University of Bangladesh
- Known for: Dean at the School of Environment and Design
- Awards: Architect of the Year Award (AYA) in New Delhi (1997 and 1999) ARCASIA Award for Architecture

Signature
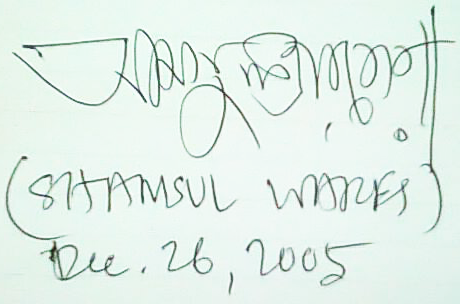

Shamsul Wares (born 21 January 1946) is a Bangladeshi architect who worked under the American architect Louis I. Kahn and his associate, Mazharul Islam.

Wares served as a faculty in the Department of Architecture, Bangladesh University of Engineering and Technology (BUET) from February 1972 to February 2003. He served as a Professor of Architecture and Dean of the faculty of Environmental Science and Design at University of Asia Pacific (UAP) from March 2003 to April 2015. Currently, he is the Advisor of the Department of Architecture at the State University of Bangladesh.

Wares has designed many residential, institutional and public buildings. He has served as president of the Institute of Architects Bangladesh (IAB) for two terms and has led the Bangladesh delegation at five ARCASIA meetings. He was awarded the Lifetime Achievement Award for Architectural Education by the institute in 2009. He also serves as a technical advisor to a number of Bangladesh government organizations including the Ministry of Public Works, Ministry of Cultural Affairs, Dhaka University, Export Promotion Bureau, etc.

He was also featured in the acclaimed documentary "My Architect: A son's Journey", based on Louis I Kahn.

== Projects ==
- Vacation House, Vurulia, Gazipur, Bangladesh.

== Awards ==
- IAB Gold Medal (2017)
