= Kazi Khaleed Ashraf =

Bangladeshi architect

- কাজী খালিদ আশরাফ
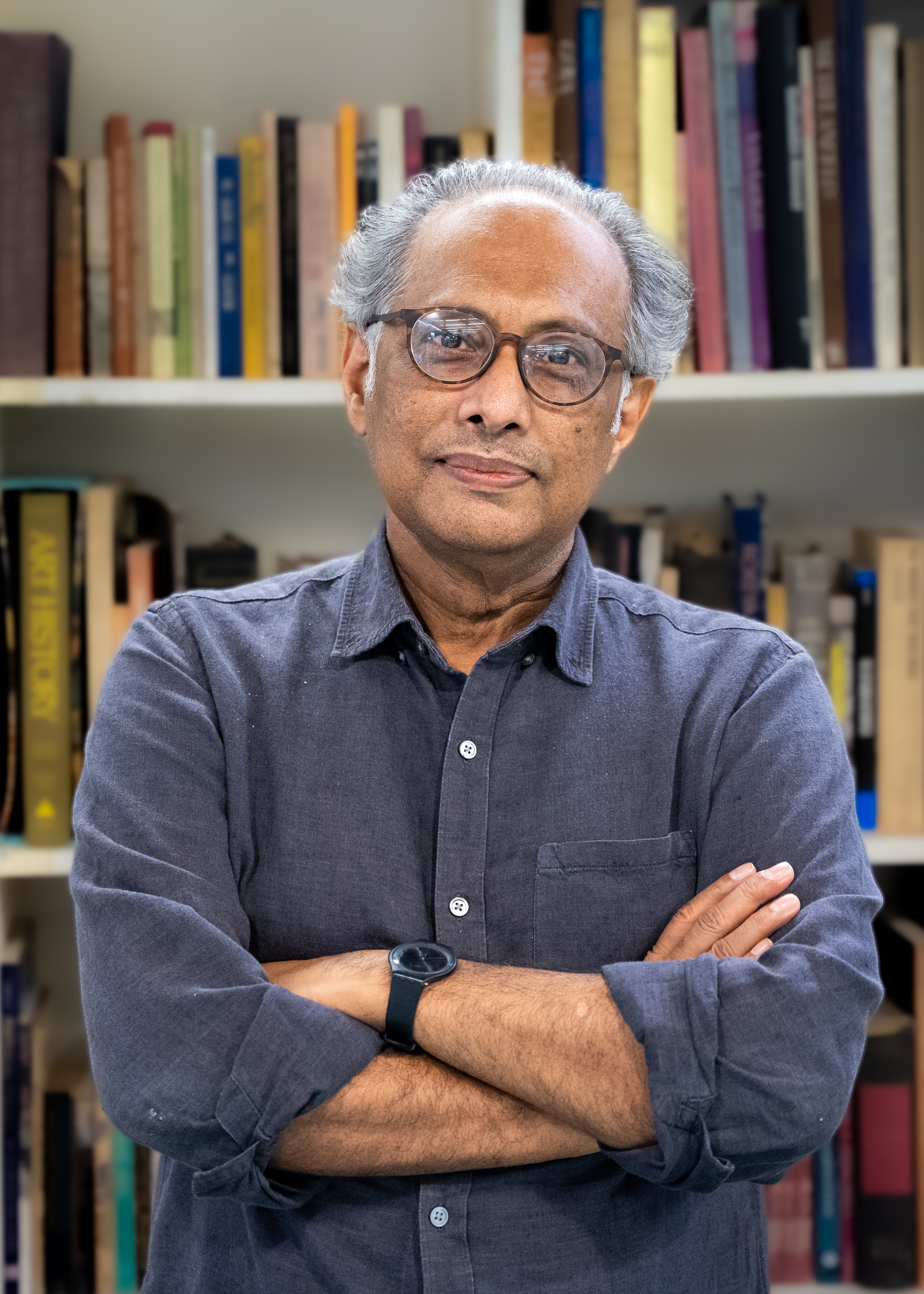
- Ashraf in 2021
- Born: 1959 (age 66–67)
- Education: Bangladesh University of Engineering and Technology Massachusetts Institute of Technology University of Pennsylvania
- Occupations: Architect, educator, urbanist, historian
- Website: kaziashraf.com

Kazi Khaleed Ashraf is a Bangladeshi architect, urbanist and architectural historian. Writing from the intersection of architecture, landscape and the city, Ashraf has authored books and essays on architecture in India and Bangladesh, the work of Louis Kahn, and the city of Dhaka. His various writings on the architecture of Bangladesh have provided a theoretical ground for understanding both the historical and contemporary forms of architecture, while his written and design work on Dhaka advances that city as a "theorem" for understanding urbanism in a deltaic geography. Ashraf and contributing team received the Pierre Vago Journalism Award from the International Committee of Architectural Critics for the Architectural Design publication Made in India. He has also co-authored a number of publications with the architect Saif Ul Haque. Ashraf has recently established an international publication series called Locations: Anthology of Architecture and Urbanism that will present works and features from around the globe.

Ashraf received his bachelor of architecture from BUET in 1983. Later he received Masters from MIT and PhD from University of Pennsylvania. Currently, director-general of Bengal Institute for Architecture, Landscapes and Settlements. Ashraf also taught at University of Hawaii, the University of Pennsylvania, Temple University and Pratt Institute.

He is also a co-founder of the cartoon magazine Unmad. established in 1978, in which he contributed as a cartoonist. His editorial drawings have appeared in The Nation, Philadelphia Inquirer, and The New York Times.

In 2021, he was invited to be on the Master Jury of the 2020–2022 cycle of the Aga Khan Award for Architecture.

== Writings ==
Ashraf writes on a wide variety of topics, and has published authoritative essays on architecture in South Asia, the works of Louis Kahn, and diverse theoretical topics. Besides books and journals, his contributions have appeared in architectural encyclopedias. Ashraf has made important contributions to the historical and theoretical narratives on architecture in Bangladesh. His essays remain a major source on the philosophy and works of the master Bangladeshi architect Muzharul Islam. Ashraf's scholarship on Louis Kahn has yielded important writings and major exhibitions, both in Bangladesh and the US.

In 1997, Ashraf curated a major exhibition on South Asian modernity (with James Belluardo) for the Architectural League of New York. The exhibition, "An Architecture of Independence: The Making of Modern South Asia," that highlighted the works of Balkrishna Doshi, Achyut Kanvinde, Charles Correa and Muzharul Islam, traveled to five cities in the US. Ashraf edited a special volume of Architectural Design titled "Made in India" that received the Pierre Vago Journalism Award from the International Committee of Architectural Critics in 2008.

A major part of Ashraf's writings is rethinking modernity and ancient linkages. His publication The Hermit’s Hut: Architecture and Asceticism in India (2013) traces roots of modern minimalism in the practices of asceticism and renunciation.

== Practices ==
Ashraf's current focus is water and the future of cities especially in such dynamic hydrological milieu as Bangladesh. His theoretical position for reconsidering water in a new design intelligence appear in various writings and the founding of Bengal Institute for Architecture, Landscapes and Settlements in Dhaka, Bangladesh, in 2015. Bengal Institute for Architecture, Landscapes and Settlements is a unique, transdisciplinary forum for the study and design of the environment, based in Dhaka, Bangladesh, that focuses on imagining a 'Future Bangladesh' through prospects of designed settlements and landscapes. The institute conducts research and design initiatives at regional and urban scales through multidisciplinary academic and research programs.

As an urban designer in charge of projects at Bengal Institute, Ashraf led critical planning and design visions for numerous towns in Bangladesh, including Narayanganj, Sylhet, and Mongla. His work on various aspects of Dhaka, including transport and public spaces, provides new prospects for the transformation of one of the most complex metropolitan cities. Working on the large-scale, and integrating city-form, landscape, agriculture, and housing, Ashraf and team proposed new regional arrangements, "metro hubs" and coastal development for Bangladesh.

== Books and publications ==
- The Mother Tongue of Architecture: Selected Writings of Kazi Khaleed Ashraf (ORO Editions and Bengal Institute, 2024)
- The Great Padma: The Epic River that made the Bengal Delta (ORO Editions and Bengal Institute, 2023)
- Locations: Anthology of Architecture and Urbanism Volume 1 (ORO Editions and Bengal Foundation, 2016)
- An Architect in Bangladesh: Conversations with Muzharul Islam (Loka Press, 2014)
- The Hermit's Hut: Asceticism and Architecture in India (University of Hawaii Press, 2013)
- Designing Dhaka: A Manifesto for a Better City (Loka Press, Dhaka, 2012)
- Guest Editor, Made in India, special issue on contemporary architecture in India, Architectural Design, John Wiley & Sons, London, December, 2007.
- Guest Editor, New Architecture, Jamini international art journal, special issue on architecture, December, 2007.
- An Architecture of Independence: The Making of Modern South Asia, (with James Belluardo), on the work of Charles Correa, Balkrishna Doshi, Muzharul Islam and Achyut Kanvinde, introduction by Kenneth Frampton, published by the Architectural League of New York with Princeton Architectural Press, New York, 1997.
- Pundranagar to Sherebanglanagar: Architecture in Bangladesh, (with Saif Ul Haque and Raziul Ahsan), Chetana Publications, Dhaka, 1997.
- GA (Global Architecture) monograph, Louis I. Kahn: National Capital Complex of Bangladesh, GA Edita Publications, Tokyo. Text by Kazi Ashraf, Photograph and Edited by Yukio Futagawa, 1994.
- Sherebanglanagar: Louis Kahn and the Making of a Capital Complex (Loka Press, Dhaka, 2002)
- Louis Kahn: House of the Nation with Richard Saul Wurman and Grischa Ruschendorf (ORO Editions, 2014).

== Essays and articles ==
- Essay, Wet Narratives: Architecture must recognise that the future is fluid, in The Architectural Review, 2017.
- Essay, Tropical Trysts: Paul Rudolph and the Bengal Delta, in Reassessing Rudolph, edited by Timothy Rohan, Yale University Press, 2017.
- Essay, Capital Complexity, in Louis Kahn: House of the Nation, by Grischa Ruschendorf, ORO Editions, 2015.
- Essay, Architecture of the Floodplain, in Topos: International Review of Landscape Architecture and Urban Design, Vol. 86, 2014.
- Essay, Post-Mortem: Building Destruction, in Architecture Post-Mortem, edited by Donald Kunze, David Bertolini and Simone Brott, Ashgate Publishers, 2013.
- Essay, Doshi’s Sangath, in The Companions to the History of Architecture, Volume 4, edited by David Leatherbarrow and Alexander Eisenschmidt, John Wiley and Sons, Malden, 2013
- Article, An Architecture of Resistance, Special Monograph on the work of Kashef Chowdhury, Architectural Review, December, 2013.
- Essay, Water as Ground, in Design in the Terrain of Water, edited by Anuradha Mathur and Dilip de Cunha, ORO Editions, 2013.
- Essay, Tropical Bricolage: The Architectural Artistry of Rafiq Azam, in Rafiq Azam: Architecture for Green Living, Skira Publishers, Rome, and Bengal Foundation, Dhaka, 2013.
- Article, Brick Raft: An Architecture for the Flood Plain, in Architectural Review, November, 2012.
- Essay, Reading the Wind and Weather: The Meteorological Architecture of Bijoy Jain, in Architectural Design, November, 2012.
- Essay, Muzharul Islam's Modernity and the Idea of “Return Home”, in Muzharul Islam Architect, edited by Zainab Faruqui Ali and Fuad H Mullick, Brac University Press, 2011.
- Essay, Designing Dhaka: The History of a Future, contribution to an edited book on the history of Dhaka, 400 Years of Capital Dhaka, Asiatic Society of Bangladesh, 2011.
- Article (with Jyoti Puri), Hometown: The City in the Post-National Landscape, Economic and Political Weekly (EPW), Vol. XLV, No. 41, October 9, 2010. Reprinted in The Mumbai Reader 10, 2012.
- Review article, Louis Kahn and the Making of a Room, Journal of Architectural Education, October, 2009.
- Essay, The Buddha’s House, RES: Aesthetics and Anthropology, Vol. 53/54, Spring/Autumn, 2009.
- Essay, Taking Place: Landscape in the Architecture of Louis Kahn, Journal of Architectural Education, November, 2007
- Article, This is Not a Building! Architectural Design, London, 2007.
- Essay, Masala City: Urban Stories from South Asia, Architectural Design, London, 2007.
- Essay, Of Land, Water and Man in Bengal: Themes for a Deltaic Architecture, in Contemporary Architecture and City Form: The South Asian Paradigm, MARG Publications, Bombay, 1997.
- Essay (with James Belluardo), Building the Nation: The Architecture of Muzharul Islam and Achyut Kanvinde, in the India International Centre Quarterly, Monsoon Issue, 1997.
- Article, Muzharul Islam, Kahn and Architecture in Bangladesh, in MIMAR 31, 1988.

== Newspaper articles ==
- Architect Muzharul Islam: The Last Modernist, The Daily Star, Dhaka, 2012.
- Missing the Metro, New Age, Dhaka, 2011.
- A New Dhaka is Possible, Forum, Dhaka, 2010.
- Mass Transit. Now! The Daily Star, Dhaka, 2010.
- Dhaka: A View from New Orleans, Forum, Dhaka, 2007.
- F.R. Khan: The Art of Standing Tall, The Daily Star, Dhaka, 2007.
- Visions for Dhaka, The Daily Star, Dhaka, 2006.
- The Miracles of Curitiba, The Daily Star, Dhaka, 2006.
- Kyoto is Like a Kimono, The Daily Star, Dhaka, 2006.
- Is Shopping the New Civic Realm? The Daily Star, Dhaka, 2004.
- Fifteen Points for Making Dhaka a City: A Manifesto, The Daily Star, Dhaka, 2003.
- Looking for America, The Daily Star, Dhaka, 1999.
- Marco Polo in Dhaka, The Daily Star, Dhaka, 1999.
- Architecture in the Spirit of Place, The Daily Star, Dhaka, 1999.
