= Faculty of Fine Arts, University of Dhaka =

Faculty

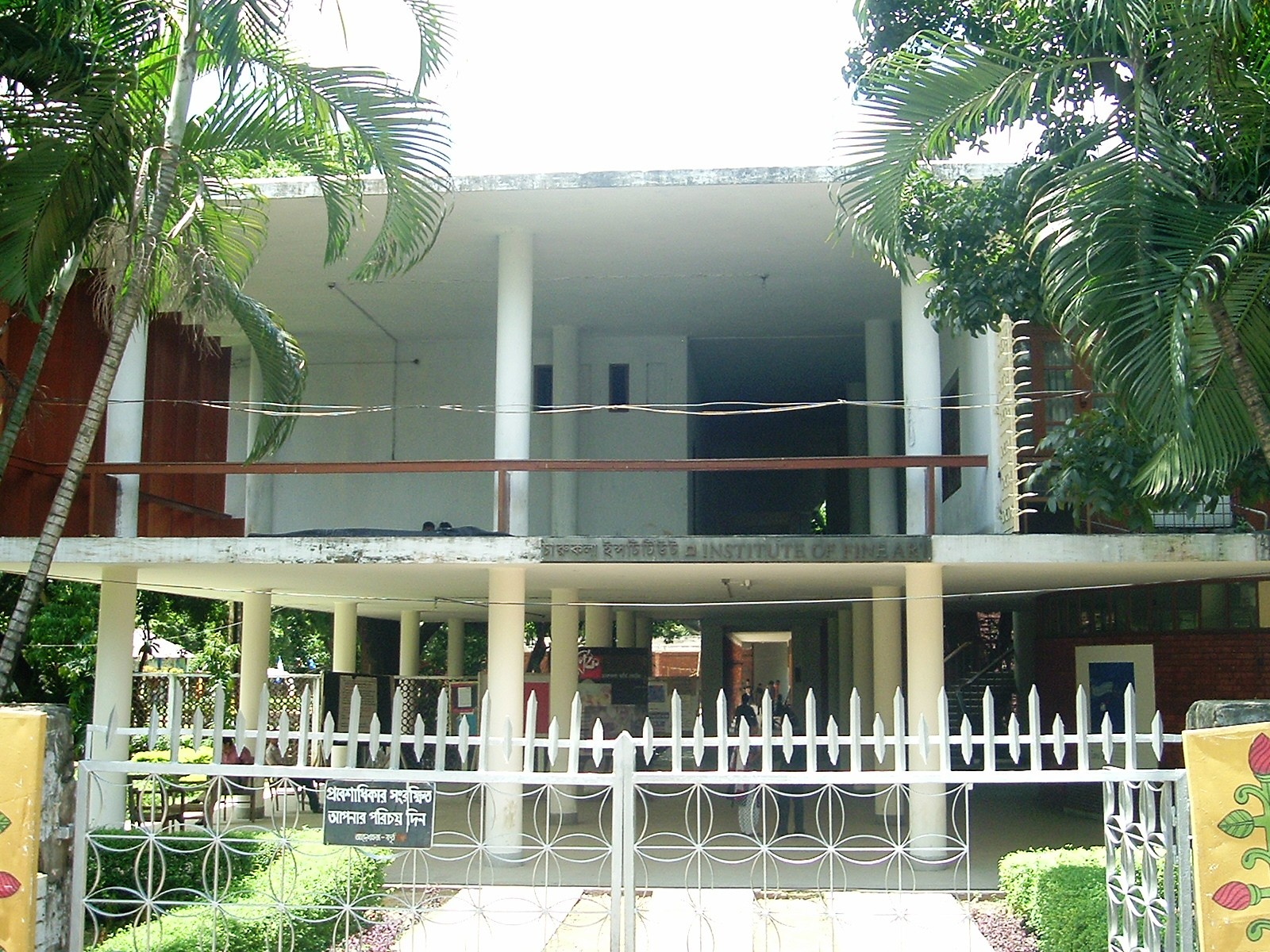
- Established: 1948: Dhaka Art School; 1963: East Pakistan College of Arts and Crafts; 1972: Bangladesh Govt. College of Arts and Crafts; 1983: Institute of Fine Arts; 2008: Faculty of Fine Arts of the University of Dhaka
- Address: Shahbag, Dhaka
- Location: Dhaka, Bangladesh
- Coordinates: 23.7357°N 90.3947°E
- Interactive map of Faculty of Fine Arts, University of Dhaka
- Website: fineart-du.com

The Faculty of Fine Arts (FFA), formerly known as the Institute of Fine Arts, is a faculty of the University of Dhaka. It was established in 1948 as the Dhaka Art School. It was the first art school in the region and became the main centre of art and cultural practice. Since 1956 it has been situated in Shahbag, Dhaka, close to the Bangladesh National Museum. Architect Muzharul Islam designed the building. In 2008, the institute took its current name when it became one of the faculties of the University of Dhaka.

== Influence on art ==
After the institute was established, within a few years, however, it became quite apparent that what was started only as a training centre had assumed a far greater role, for it quickly became a meeting place for all aspiring artists and a forum from which a new art movement could be launched. The faculty and students of the institute were in touch with what was happening in the West. Many teachers went to Europe and Japan for training and came back with new ideas; but they were also steeped in the traditions of indigenous and folk art and art forms. The West played a formative influence in sharpening their sensibilities, but their firm root protected them from losing their sense of direction and becoming mere imitators of western art. This ability to balance and blend the very best elements of local and foreign art has been a strong point for Bangladeshi artists. Over the fifty years since the inception of the Art Institute, Bangladeshi art has made remarkable progress. The training provided to its students gave them the freedom to develop their own talents in keeping with their dominant inclinations. The heritage of the Bengal school was closely followed by the students of oriental art, while folk forms found their way in the work of many artists (including the founding teachers Zainul Abedin and Qamrul Hassan).

== Architecture ==
This masterpiece was Muzharul Islam's first architectural endeavor. The site is in the Roman area as part of Dhaka University Campus. The Roman area is well known for its gardens and parks. Most of the buildings in this area have been designed in the scheme of a "bagan bari" (house in a garden). The site that was given for the institute was dotted with beautiful trees with a large circular depression at the end of the site. Muzharul Islam decided to come up with a design scheme that would retain all the trees on the site (as some of them were large beautiful trees that would have required many years to grow). His scheme was also climate-responsive and had large continuous verandahs shading the inner walls and windows of the classrooms and studios. The design echoes the outhouse and inner house scheme of rural Bangladesh. It also transforms ‘Jalees’ (lattices) and ‘beras’ (perforated screens) into wonderful screens that separate and creates thresholds. One enters into the front pavilion, a wonderful structure that houses galleries on the ground floor and teachers and common rooms, etc. on the first. Wonderful sculptural stairs connect the two levels around a wonderful internal courtyard. Past the pavilion are the classrooms and studios and in the far end encircling the round depression are the print studios. A lotus pond and sitting area become the open heart of the whole institute. The ground in the south is both a relief and a place to gather. This ground and the whole structure itself transform to host many activities namely the Bengali New Year ‘Pohela Boishakh’ and numerous art classes and competitions for children. Bricks of the project were also custom-designed by Muzharul Islam as so are the terracotta screens.

== Present condition ==
At present the institute has eight departments—Graphic Design, Oriental Art, Ceramics, Drawing and Painting, Sculpture, Crafts, History of Arts and Printmaking. Programmes include four-year Bachelor of Fine Arts (BFA Honours) and two-year Master of Fine Arts (MFA) for all departments. The number of students enrolled annually has gone up—from 80 to around 120. The Graphic Design department has a new computer lab. Students of FFA now have options to work part-time (at media houses and ad firms) and the commercial aspect of BFA and MFA degrees from the institute now seems favourable, opportunities the previous generations did not enjoy. There are 43 permanent teachers and most of the teachers are eminent artists of the country. FFA is an important centre of Modern art practice in Bangladesh. Many eminent and internationally renowned artists of Bangladesh were the students of this Faculty. The importance of this Art Institute in the cultural life of Bangladesh cannot be overemphasized. For the last 50 years, it has worked not simply as an institution imparting art education but also as a cultural centre for Bengalis, functioning as a force for cultural revival and regeneration.

== Gallery ==
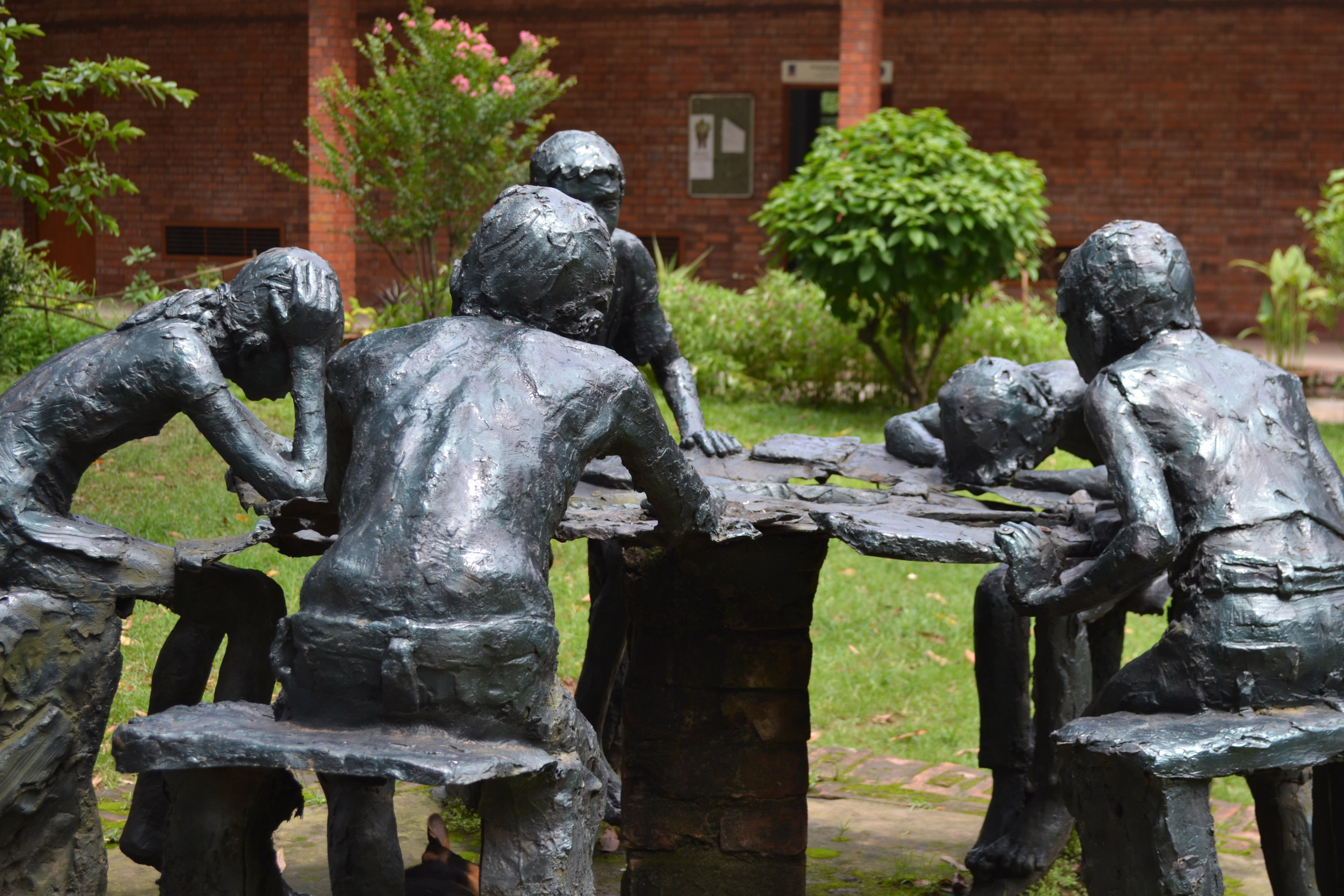
Serious discussion, a sculpture beside the institute

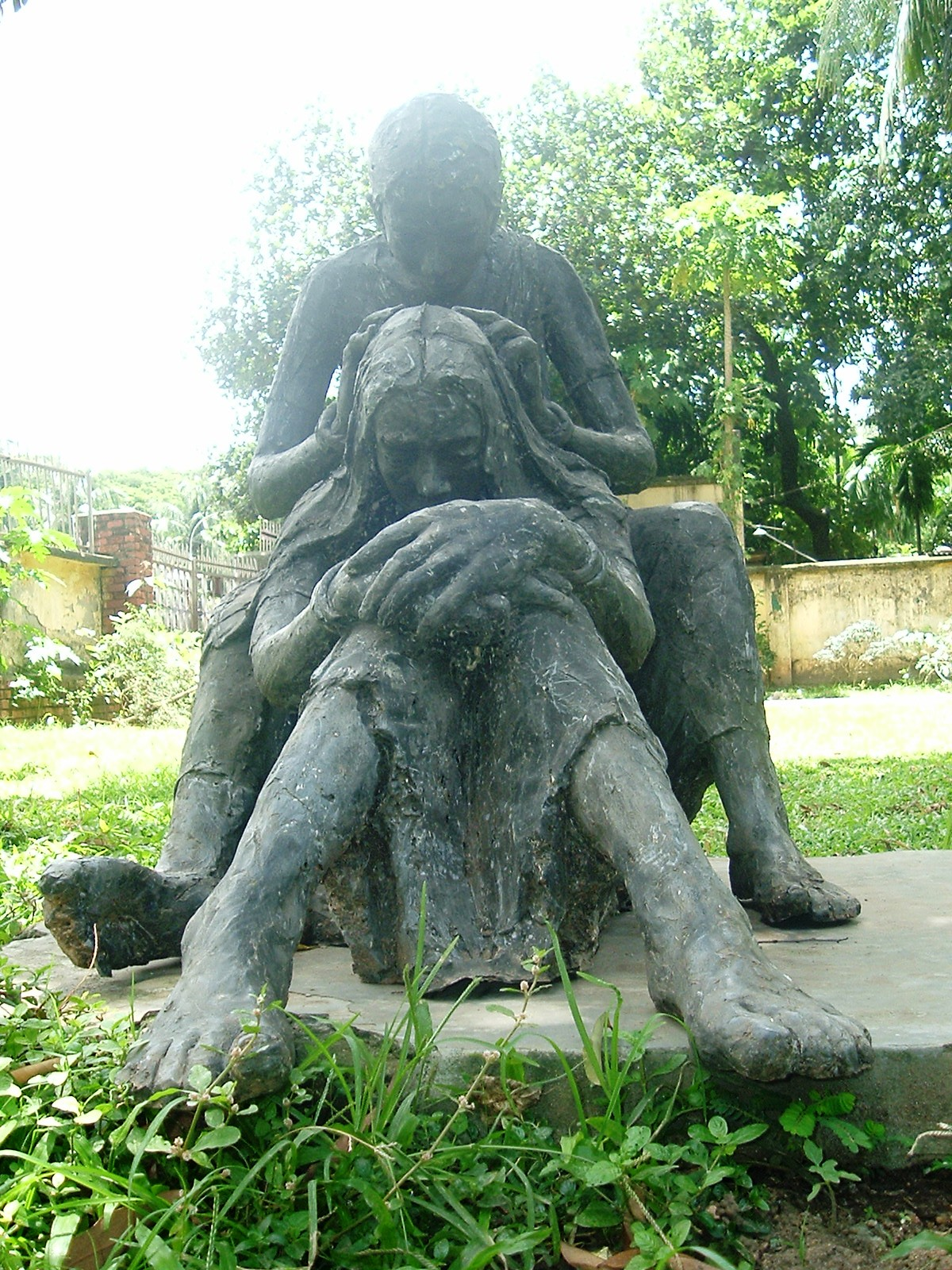
A sculpture beside the institute building

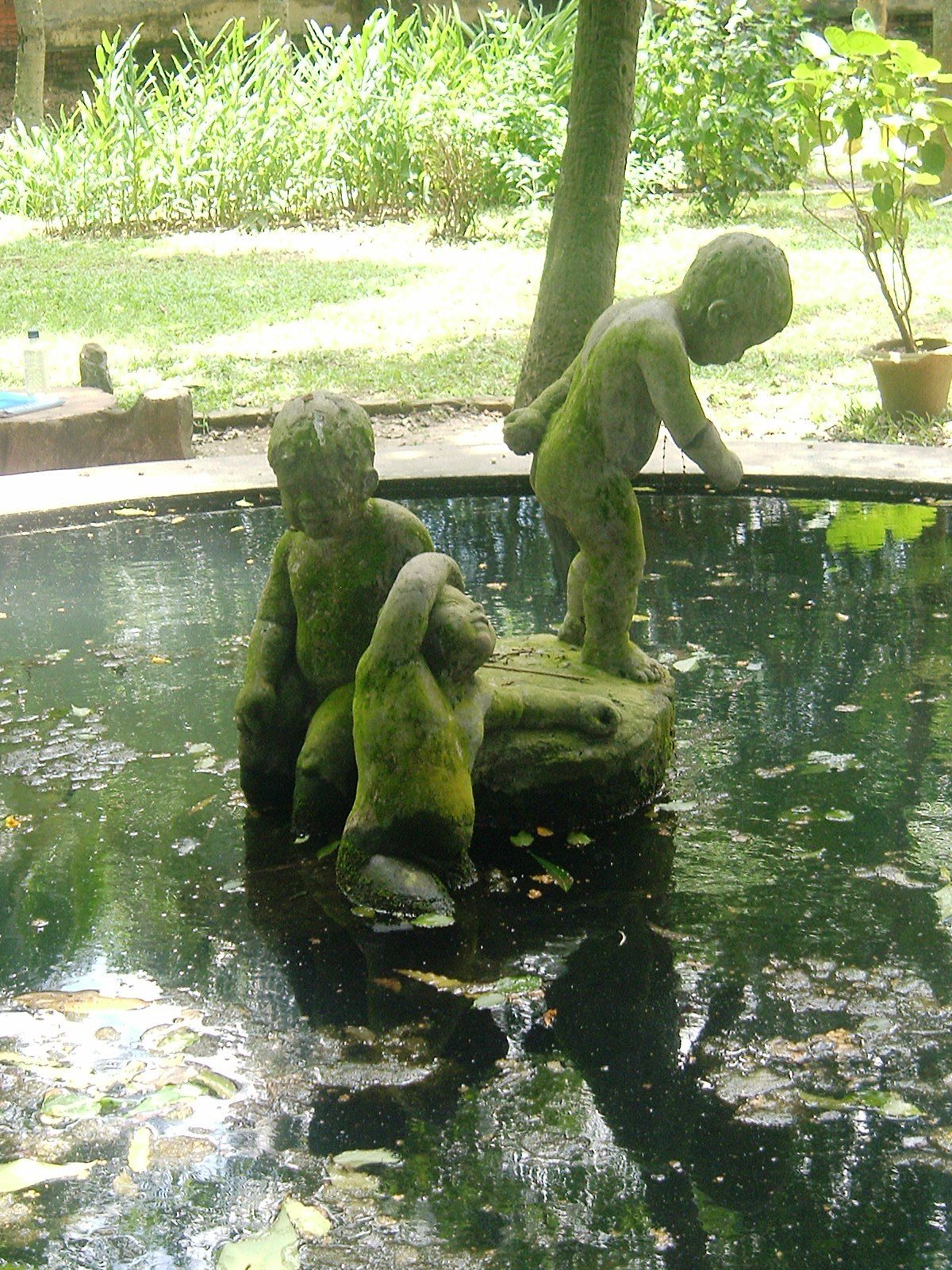
Another sculpture

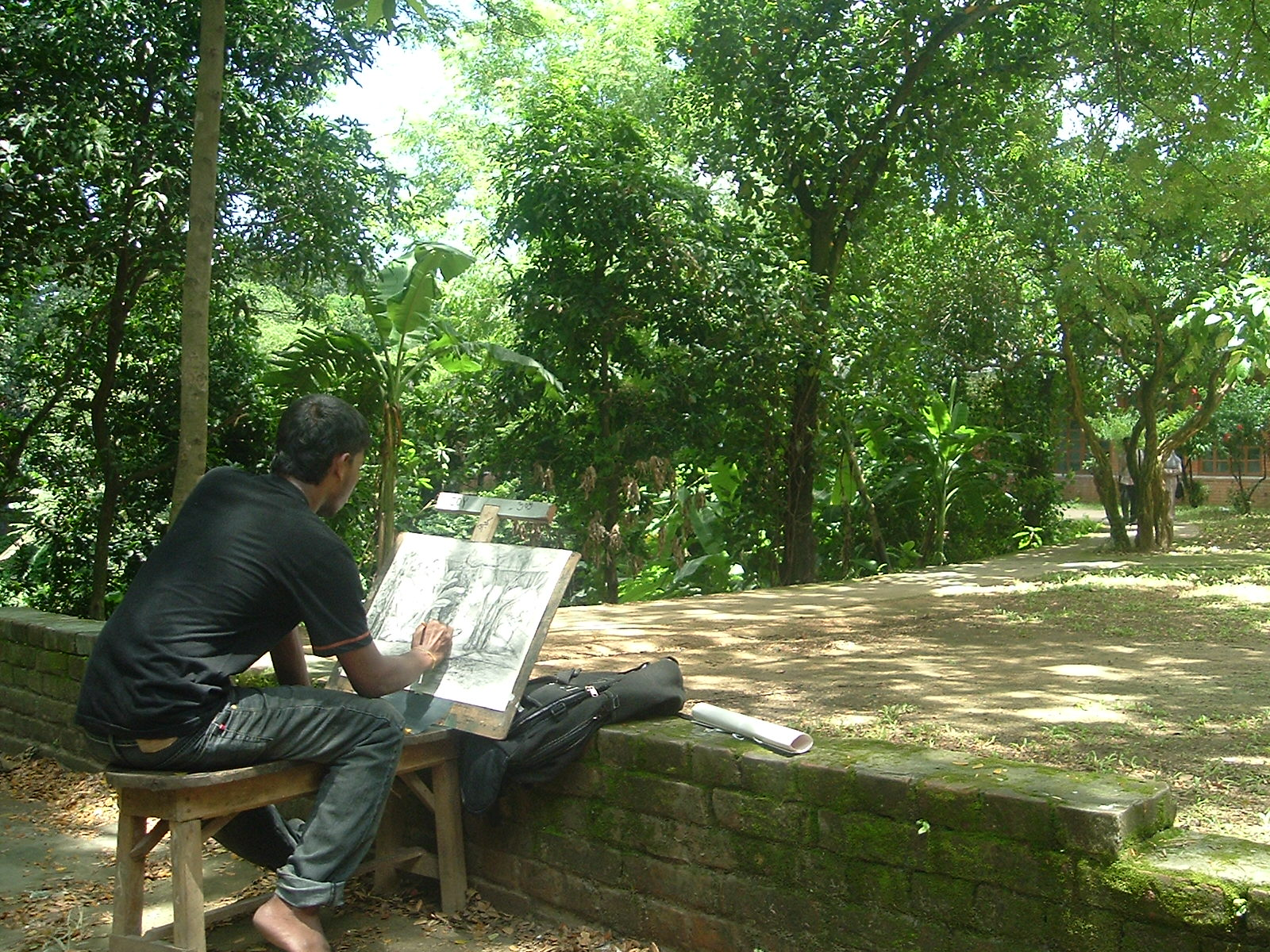
A student painting, beside the institute building

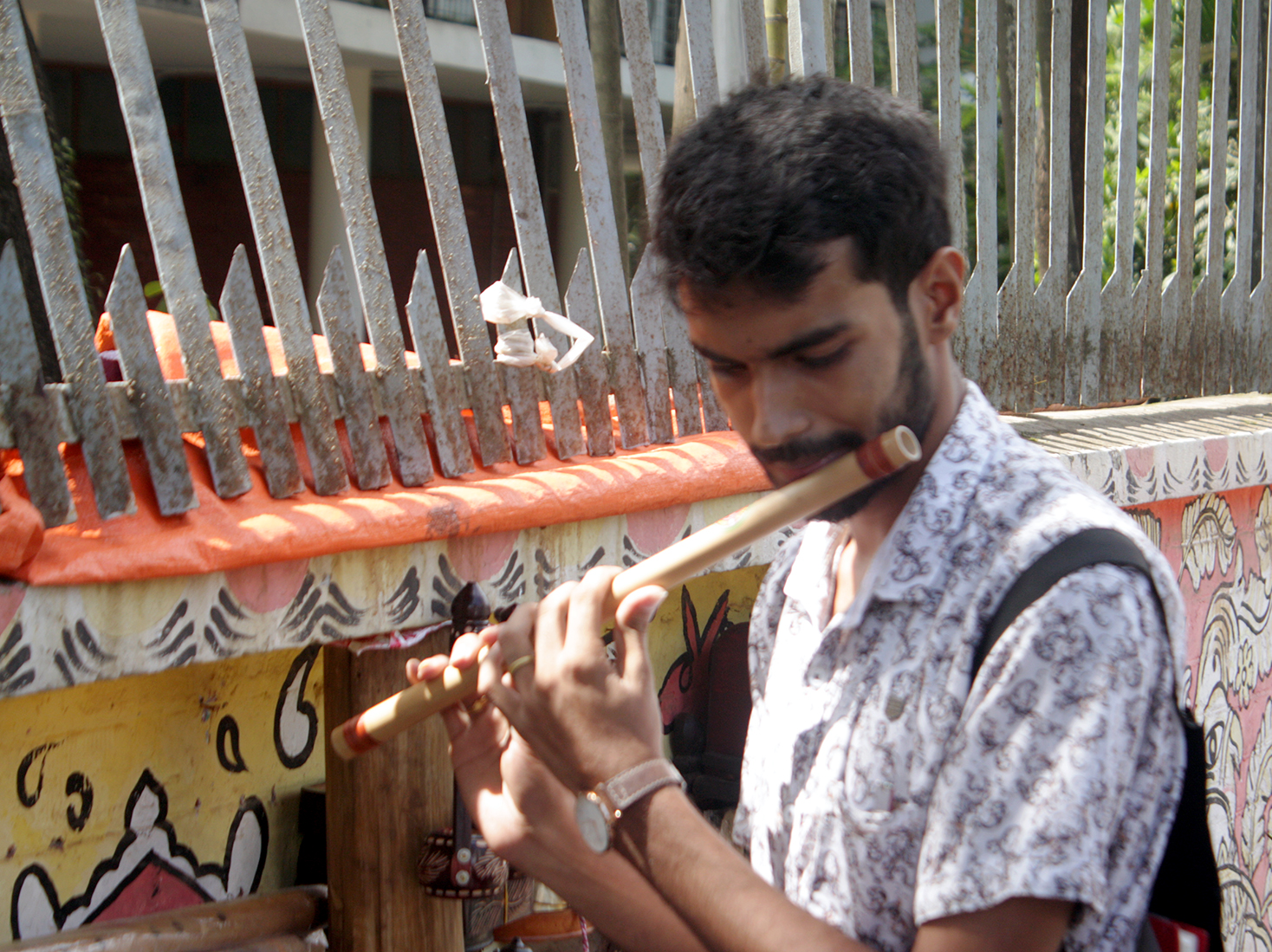
A student playing flute in front of the institute building
