= Commonwealth Association of Architects =

Architectural organization

- Abbreviation: CAA
- Formation: 1965
- Type: Professional Membership Body of National Architectural Associations
- Legal status: Registered Charity (UK)
- Region served: The Commonwealth
- President: John Brown
- Senior Vice President: Hugo Chan
- Immediate Past President: Steven Oundo
- Honorary Treasurer, Secretary & Trustee: Vince Pirrello
- Key people: Mike Brennan (Executive Director); Danielle Catley (Executive Director)
- Website: https://www.commonwealtharchitects.org

The Commonwealth Association of Architects (CAA), established in 1965, is a professional association of national architectural associations representing architects in Commonwealth countries. The stated purpose of the CAA is to "maximise the contribution of architects to the well-being of society." The organisation's mission is to help facilitate real change through the Commonwealth network by advancing policy, education and practice to increase inclusion, equality and prosperity. Ultimately, the CAA aims to help make cities and human settlements safe, resilient and sustainable. The CAA is one of 80 accredited organisations which support the work of the Commonwealth of Nations.

== History ==
At the time of its formation in 1965, the CAA was formed by six architectural institutions. By the 1990s, the organisation had grown to represent 38 architecture institutions, with a combined membership of over 44,000 architects from across the Commonwealth.

The first President of the CAA was Sir Robert Matthew CBE from 1965 to 1969. Peter Oborn served as President of the organisation between 2022-2024. Following a General Assembly held in Kigali, Rwanda on 22 August 2024, Steven Oundo from the Architects Association of Kenya was elected President for the 2024-2026 term.

A five-day International Architectural Exhibition of the Commonwealth Association of Architects was held in Battaramulla, Colombo, Sri Lanka in November 2013. It ran concurrently with the Commonwealth Heads of Government Meeting.

The organisation held a two-day international summit in London, in June 2015, to celebrate its 50th anniversary.

In October 2025, it was announced that the CAA's 60th Anniversary General Assembly would be held in Auckland, New Zealand, hosted by Te Kāhui Whaihanga New Zealand Institute of Architects as part of their biennale in:situ architecture conference.

== Structure ==
=== Constitution ===
The CAA is formed by Constitution which was first adopted at the general assembly of June 1965. Since then, it has been regularly amended and updated in 1971, 1976, 1979, 1980, 1982, 1987, 1994, 2000, 2003, February 2016, August 2022 and August 2024. The Constitution outlines articles on the objectives, membership, assembly, council, finances, committees and by-laws which govern the day-to-day operation of the CAA.

=== Governance ===
The strategic direction of the CAA is determined by an elected Council, drawn from member organisations and elected at a General Assembly held on a two-year cycle. The CAA Council is supported by two committees - Education and Practice alongside a part-time Secretariat and a five-member Board of Trustees. The CAA is a registered charity in the UK.

=== Council ===
The CAA Council has the following members:

- President
- Senior Vice President
- Immediate Past-President
- Honorary Secretary & Treasurer
- Executive Director
- Vice President, Africa
- Vice President, Asia
- Vice President, Caribbean and Americas
- Vice President, Europe
- Vice President, Pacific
- Chair of Education & Validation Committee
- Chair of Practice Committee
- Youth Representative

== Initiatives ==
=== Research ===
Published in 2020, the CAA's Survey of the Built Environment Professions in the Commonwealth identified that Commonwealth Countries are forecast to account for nearly 50% of the projected growth in towns and cities over the next 30 years. The survey also revealed a critical lack of capacity in many of the Commonwealth countries which are urbanising most rapidly and are among the most vulnerable to climate change.

=== Accreditation of Commonwealth Architecture Schools ===
One of the principal initiatives of the CAA is to provide guidelines on development of architecture schools, including a validation system for architecture courses. It has focused on ensuring schools of architecture include The Habitat Agenda and principles of environmentally sustainable design to be part of every syllabus for courses validated in the Commonwealth. The process of accrediting schools was first developed in 1968, when the CAA published a List of Qualifications in Architecture Recommended for Recognition. Since then, it has been regularly reviewed and overhauled, eventually becoming integrated with a Statement of Objectives and Standards of Recognition of Schools and is informally known as 'The Green Book'. In 2012 the UK's Royal Institute of British Architects (RIBA) ceased to recognise CAA accreditation of Commonwealth architecture schools, after the CAA refused to grant 'significant' RIBA representation on its accreditation panels to inspect schools first-hand. At the time CAA validated 41 colleges, though only visited 15 of them beforehand.

=== Awards Programme ===
The CAA runs an awards programme held at its general assembly once every two years, with a focus on recognising the work of architects and students that engage with contemporary challenges such as climate change and rapid urbanisation together with associated increases in vulnerability, inequality, and biodiversity loss. The awards celebrate individuals who have made a demonstrable contribution to addressing such issues and contributes to delivery of the United Nations Sustainable Development Goals (SDGs).

The awards programme comprises the following:

- The Lifetime Achievement Award (Robert Matthew Award) - Awarded to an individual or architectural practice in recognition of innovative contributions to the development of architecture in the Commonwealth.
- The Environmental Impact Award - Recognises work in any sector which can demonstrate achievement of a significant positive environmental impact in areas such as circular economy, energy and carbon, water, ecology and biodiversity and/or connectivity and transport.
- The Social Impact Award - Recognises work in any sector which can demonstrate having achieved significant positive social impact in areas such as affordability, community development, health and well-being, and social value.
- The President's Award - Recognises work of a student in Years 4, 5 & 6 which critically and creatively addresses issues associated with social, economic and environmental well-being in the context of the current climate emergency.
- The Student Award - Recognises the work of a student in Years 1, 2 & 3 which creatively addresses issues associated with social, economic, and environmental well-being in the context of the current climate emergency.

==== Lifetime Achievement Award (Robert Matthew Award) ====
First awarded in 1983, the CAA Lifetime Achievement Award, also known as Robert Matthew Award, was established to recognise innovative contributions to the development of architecture in the Commonwealth context and commemorates the legacy of the first President of the CAA, Sir Robert Hogg Matthew.

Year	Recipient	Country	Commonwealth Region
1983	Philip Cox AO	Australia	Pacific
1985	ARUP Associates	United Kingdom	Europe
1989	Raj Rewal	India	Asia
1991	Hampshire Country Council Architects Department	United Kingdom	Europe
1994	Ian Ritchie Architects	United Kingdom	Europe
1997	Gregory Burgess Architects	Australia	Pacific
2000	TR Hamzah and Yeang	Malaysia	Asia
2003	Balkrishna Vithaldas Doshi	India	Asia
2016	Grimshaw Architects (Joint Winner)	United Kingdom	Europe
2016	Pervaiz Vandal & Associates (Joint Winner)	Pakistan	Asia
2019	Prof. Richard England	Malta	Europe
2022	Rafiq Azam	Bangladesh	Asia
2024	Yasmeen Lari	Pakistan	Asia
2026	Peter Clegg OBE	United Kingdom	Europe

== Presidents ==
Presidents of the CAA are elected by members at the general assembly and have historically served three-year terms. In 2022, following changes to the constitution, the term of office was altered and Presidents of the CAA now serve a two-year term.

Term of Office	President	Country	Commonwealth Region
1965-1967	Sir Robert Matthew CBE	United Kingdom	Europe
1967-1969	Sir Robert Matthew CBE	United Kingdom	Europe
1969-1971	Dr. Jai Rattan Bhalla	India	Asia
1971-1973	Dr. Jai Rattan Bhalla	India	Asia
1973-1976	Mr. Ronald Andrew Gilling OBE	Australia	Pacific
1976-1979	Mr. Oluwole Olusegun Olumuyiwa	Nigeria	Africa
1979-1982	Mr. Frederic Rounthwaite	Canada	Caribbean & Americas
1982-1985	Prof. Peter Johnson AC	Australia	Pacific
1985-1987	Mr. John Wells-Thorpe OBE	United Kingdom	Europe
1987-1989	Dato I Hisham Albarkri	Malaysia	Asia
1989-1991	Dr. Wale Odeleye	Nigeria	Africa
1991-1994	Mr. David Jackson AO	Australia	Pacific
1994-1997	Mr. Rusi Khambatta	India	Asia
1997-2000	Prof. George Henderson	United Kingdom	Europe
2000-2003	Mr. Philip Kungu	Kenya	Africa
2003-2007	Mr. Llewellyn van Wyk	South Africa	Africa
2007-2010	Prof. Gordon Holden	New Zealand	Pacific
2010-2013	Mr. Mubasshar Hussain	Bangladesh	Asia
2013-2016	Mr. Rukshan Widyalankara	Sri Lanka	Asia
2016-2019	Mr. Vincent Cassar	Malta	Europe
2019-2022	Mr. Kalim A. Siddiqui	Pakistan	Asia
2022-2024	Mr. Peter Oborn	United Kingdom	Europe
2024-2026	Mr. Steven Oundo	Kenya	Africa
2026-Present	Prof. John Brown	Canada	Caribbean & Americas
