= Saif Ul Haque =

Bangladeshi architect

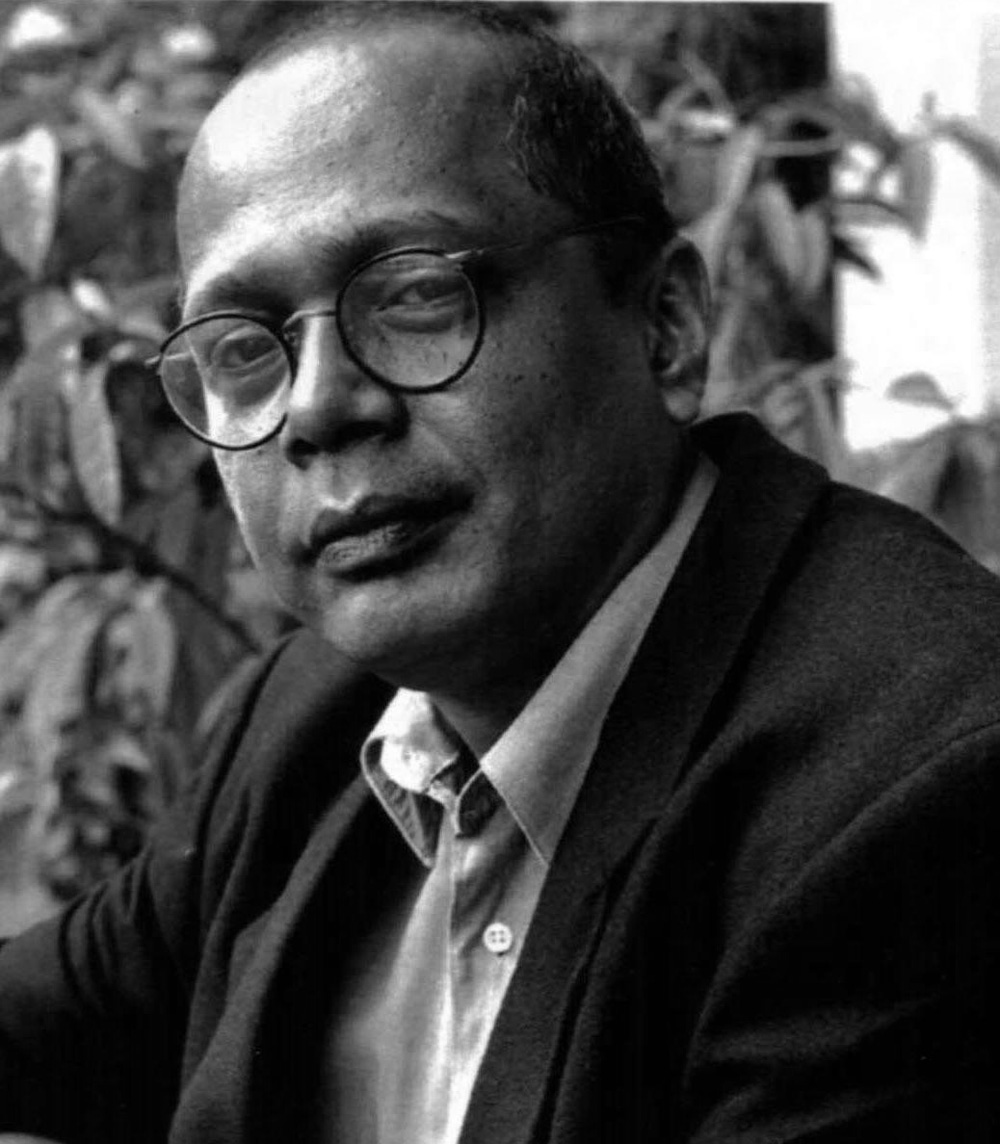
- Saif Ul Haque, 2012
- Born: 14 August 1958 (age 68); Bangladesh
- Education: Bangladesh University of Engineering and Technology
- Occupations: Architect, educator
- Awards: IAB Award, ARCASIA Award, Aga Khan Award for Architecture
- Practice: Saif Ul Haque Sthapati
- Buildings: Arcadia Education Project at Keraniganj, Dhaka (2015); Gyan BIgyan Kendro, Modhupur (2003); Govinda Gunalanker Hostel at Chittagong (1999); Camp-house for an Archaeological Team at Bogra (1996); Banchte Shekha Training Center at Jessore (1994); BRAC Training Center at Faridpur (1992)

Saif Ul Haque (Bengali: সাইফুল হক) is an architect and educator based in Dhaka. He received Aga Khan Award for Architecture in 2017-2019 cycle.

== Career ==
Saif Ul Haque completed his bachelor of architecture from Bangladesh University of Engineering and Technology and established Diagram Architects in 1984 with two other partners. He later started his own practice Saif Ul Haque Sthapati.

== Notable works ==
Govinda Gunalanker Hostel, Chittagong

- Arcadia Education Project, South Kanarchor, Bangladesh (2016)
- Design Development Center, Chittagong (2012-)
- Paramount School and College, Rajshahi (2009)
- Gyan BIgyan Kendro, Modhupur (2003)
- Govinda Gunalanker Hostel at Chittagong (1999)
- Camp House for an Archaeological Team at Bogra (1996)
- Banchte Shekha Training Center at Jessore (1994)
- BRAC Training Center at Faridpur (1992)

== Awards ==
- IAB Design Award (2002)
- ARCASIA Award (2002)
- J.K. Cement Award (2001)
- Aga Khan Award for Architecture 2017-2019 cycle, for the Arcadia Education Project.

== Exhibition ==
- Dhaka Art Summit (2015)

== Publications ==
- Sherebanglanagar: Louis I Kahn and the Making of a Capital Complex (co-author) (2002)
- Pundranagar to Sherebanglanagar: Architecture in Bangladesh (co-editor) (1997)
