= Muzharul Islam =

Bangladeshi architect and professor

- মাজহারুল ইসলাম
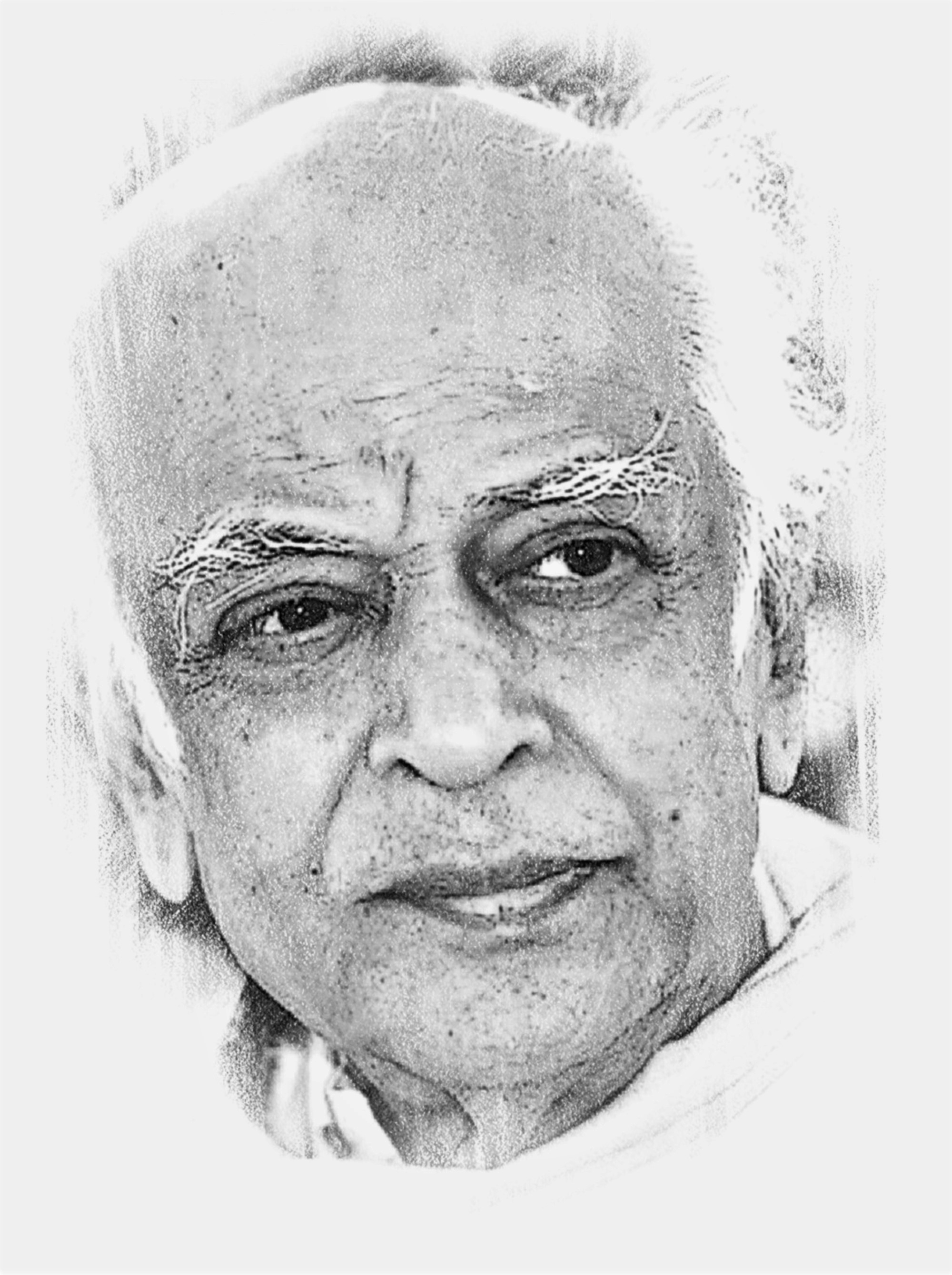
- Born: 25 December 1923; Murshidabad, British India
- Died: 15 July 2012 (aged 88); Dhaka, Bangladesh
- Education: Yale University
- Occupations: Architect educator
- Awards: Grand Master Award, South Asian Architecture Award Ceremony; Independence Award
- Practice: Vastukalabid
- Buildings: Faculty of Fine Arts; Jahangirnagar University Master Plan and designs Chittagong University master plan and designs Bangladesh National Archive

Muzharul Islam (25 December 1923 – 15 July 2012) was a Bangladeshi architect, urban planner, educator, and activist. He is considered the grand master of regional modernism in South Asia. Islam is the pioneer of modern architecture in Bangladesh and the father of Bengali modernism. Islam's style and influence dominated the architectural scene in the country during the 1960s and 70s, along with major US architects he brought to work in Dhaka.

As a teacher, architect, and social and political activist, Islam set the course of architectural practice in the country not only through his own many varied works but also through being instrumental in inviting architects such as Louis Kahn, Richard Neutra, Stanley Tigerman, Paul Rudolph, Robert Boughey, and Konstantinos Doxiadis to work in Bangladesh.

== Early life ==
Muzharul Islam was born on 25 December 1923 in Murshidabad. He went to the United States in 1950, where he received his bachelor's degree in architecture from the University of Oregon. In 1956, he received a scholarship to study tropical architecture at the AA School of Architecture, London. In 1961, he completed his post-graduation under Paul Rudolph from Yale University. At Yale, Stanley Tigerman was one of his classmates, and there he came in touch with Louis I. Kahn. Muzharul Islam began his career by designing two buildings in the Shahbag area in 1955 – Dhaka University Library and College of Arts and Crafts. Between 1958 and 1964, Islam was an architect in the C&B Department of the government of East Pakistan.

== Career ==
Site Plan for Sher-e-Bangla Nagar

His most important work was born when the Governor's Conference of Pakistan decided in 1959, under the leadership of President Ayub Khan, that Dhaka would be the second capital of Pakistan. The government decided to build a capital complex at Sher-e-Bangla Nagar, Dhaka. Muzharul Islam was given the task of designing the Jatiya Sangsad Bhaban (National Assembly Building of Bangladesh). But he brought his teacher Louis Kahn into the project to do a significant work for future generations. Islam worked closely with him from 1965 to Kahn's death in 1973.

Along with Kahn, he also brought Paul Rudolph and Stanley Tigerman to work in Bangladesh, and three of them came to be known as the American Trio. Apart from the Trio, it was Islam's monumental style that dominated Bangladesh architecture from the 1950s onwards.

His major works include – Jahangirnagar University, Chittagong University, Central Public Library, Charukala Institute, the Azimpur Estate, Rangmati township, and a number of Polytechnic Institutes. Islam designed the master plan of Dhaka City.

== Awards ==
- Institute of Architects, Bangladesh Gold Medal, 1993
- He was awarded the Honorary Fellowship of the American Institute of Architects at the National convention of the Institute at Dallas, Texas, in 1999.
- He was an honourable member of the Master Jury of the First Aga Khan Award for Architecture, Geneva, 1980.
- Islam has been a jury member for several national and international design competitions and awards including:
  - The Aga Khan Award for Architecture
  - Design contest for Faisal Mosque competition in Islamabad
  - Design contests for the headquarters building of the Islamic Development Bank in Jeddah
  - Headquarters building of the Ministry of Foreign Affairs building at Riyadh, which won the Aga Khan Award for Architecture
- He was awarded the Independence Day Award in 1999, the highest state award of Bangladesh.

A documentary film on Mazharul Islam named Tini (The Architect) was released by the Institute of Architects Bangladesh in 2000, which was directed by Enamul Karim Nirjhar.

== Notable works ==
| Year | Project | Image | Location | Comments |
|---|---|---|---|---|
| 1953–54 | College of Arts and Crafts | | Shahbag, Dhaka | |
| 1953–54 | Dhaka University Library | | University of Dhaka | |
| 1953–54 | Bangladesh National Archives and Library | | Sher-e-Bangla Nagar, Dhaka | |
| 1962 | Housing for class IV Employees | | Azimpur Estate, Dhaka | |
| 1963–64 | Railway Rehabilitation Zone | | Khilgaon, Dhaka | Plan for the project |
| 1963–64 | Rangamati Town | | Rangamati, CHT | Plan for the project |
| 1963–65 | BCSIR Laboratory Buildings | | Dhanmondi, Dhaka | |
| 1964 | National Institute of Public Administration Building | | Shahbag, Dhaka | |
| 1965–71 | Headquarters Building, Agricultural Development Corporation | | Motijheel, Dhaka | 14 storied |
| 1965–71 | 5 polytechnic institutes | | Rangpur, Bogra, Pabna, Sylhet, and Barisal | In collaboration with Arch. Stanley Tigerman |
| 1965–71 | EFU Building (Jiban Bima Bhaban) Project | | Motijheel, Dhaka | 27 storied |
| 1965–71 | Road Research Laboratories | | Dhaka, Bangladesh | |
| 1968–71 | Chittagong University master plan and designs | | Chittagong University, Chittagong | Designs for students' hostel, humanities building, science building, administrative building, readers' quarters, VC's quarters, professors' quarters, storage, and godowns |
| 1968–71 | Housing for Ruppur Atomic Energy Complex | | Savar, Dhaka | |
| 1968–71 | Jahangirnagar University Master Plan and designs | | Jahangirnagar University, Dhaka | Designs for students' hostel, readers' quarters and class IV employees' quarters |
| 1980–84 | Jaipurhat Limestone and cement Project | | Jaipurhat, Bangladesh | Master plan, housing for 200 officers, housing for 1700 employees, clinic and hospital, clinic and hospital, bazaar and mosque |
| 1980–84 | National Library | | Sher-e-Bangla Nagar, Dhaka | |
| 1987 | Office Building for the World Bank | | Dhaka, Bangladesh | |
| 1995 | Garden City Project | | Dhaka, Bangladesh | 20 storied |
| 2008 | Mausoleum of Kazi Nazrul Islam | | Dhaka, Bangladesh | |

== Death ==
Muzharul Islam died on 15 July 2012 at 12.06 am in Dhaka, Bangladesh. He was aged 88.

== Publications ==
Some publications featured Muzharul Islam:

- Encyclopædia Britannica, Volume 22, 15th Edition, 1986, page 99.
- Architectural Review, London, April 1960, Page 155.
- Environments, Volume 19, Number 2, 1988, University of Waterloo, Ontario, Canada, Page-55 to 60.
- Architecture + Design, New Delhi, India, May–June 1988, page- 26 to 32 & 36.

+ Mimar magazine, 1989, Page 55-63.

- The Sangbad, Dhaka, 23 December 1993, Page-12.
- Daily Bhorer Kagoj, Dhaka, 24 December 1993, Page-9.
- Daily Bhorer Kagoj, Dhaka, 7 March 1994, Page-12.
- Weekly Holiday, Dhaka, 31 December 1993, Page-6.
- Daily Star, Dhaka, August 2000.
- Exhibition, "An Architecture of Independence: The Making of Modern South Asia," on the Works of Four Architects of the Indian Sub-Continent; New York, Philadelphia, 1997, Curated by Kazi Khaleed Ashraf and James Bellurado.
- Exhibition of Architecture in Bangladesh, "Pundranagar" to Sher-e-Bangla Nagar (350 B.C. to present time), 1997. Edited by Raziul Ahsan, Kazi Khaleed Ashraf and Saif Ul Haque.
- An Architecture of Independence : The Making of Modern South Asia, 1997, University of Pennsylvania, Edited by Kazi Khaleed Ashraf and James Belluardo.
- The India International Centre Quarterly: Monsoon 1997, Volume- 24, Number 2–3.
- Architect Muzharul Islam and Chicago Architect Stanly Tigerman did the elaborate study on typology and tectonics, ecology, climate and materials. Their study resulted in a major report, which was featured in the September 1968 issue of "Architectural Record".
- Vastukatha: Selected Sayings of Architect Muzharul Islam | বাস্তুকথা: স্থপতি মাজহারুল ইসলামের নির্বাচিত উক্তি, Edited by Kazi Khaleed Ashraf and Saif Ul Haque, Published by BI Books -Bengal Publications
- Muzharul Islam Architect, Edited by Fuad H Mallick, Zainab Faruqui Ali
- স্থপতি মাজহারুল ইসলাম, সম্পাদনা - আবুল হাসনাত

== Quotes ==
- "Symbol for what? Symbol of what? Symbol of whom?... The hesitation in my mind has deep roots. I feel that human society has been kept in darkness for thousands of years by the use of symbols. I revolt against it. By raising the issue of symbols, in the name of symbols, my perspective has been kept limited."
- "Cities should provide the environment for civilized life within the context of our own culture... The city can develop only as a part of the physical environment of the country- with the ultimate aim of abolishing all differences between the city and the rural areas. The traditional relationship with nature (still existing to a certain extent in the village of Bangladesh) should be continued in the cities."
- "The artistic qualities are essence of architecture. The practical aspects of architecture are measurable – such as, the practical requirements, climatic judgements, the advantages and limitations of the site etc. – but the humanistic aspects are not measurable. This depends on the talent, sensitivity and creativity of the architect. Only some bookish knowledge is not a sufficient tool in this regard. One has to be creative. One has to love his own land, its people and its culture and think profoundly about these. The love of one's own land is the eternal source of creative power, which in turn, makes a proper architect."
- "You have to be a world man and a Bengali. It's impossible otherwise... When I mention standing on one's own soil... it is to find oneself, but not to find oneself and become stagnant. What I am seeking is to stand on one's own feet and then to proceed forward. If for that reason I have to take two steps backward to go one step forward. I have no problem with that. I think that there is no other way of moving forward."

== See also ==
- List of Bangladeshi architects

== Sources ==
- Kashef Mahboob Chowdhury (20 July 2003). "Harmony of Vision". The Daily Star.
