= Mubasshar Hussein =

Bengali architect (1943–2022)

- Born: 27 December 1943; Wari, Dhaka, Bengal Province, British India
- Died: 2 January 2023 (aged 79); Shyamoli, Dhaka, Bangladesh
- Education: Bangladesh University of Engineering and Technology
- Occupations: Architect; Educator
- Practice: Assoconsult Ltd.
- Buildings: Proshika Bhaban; Grameen Bank Building

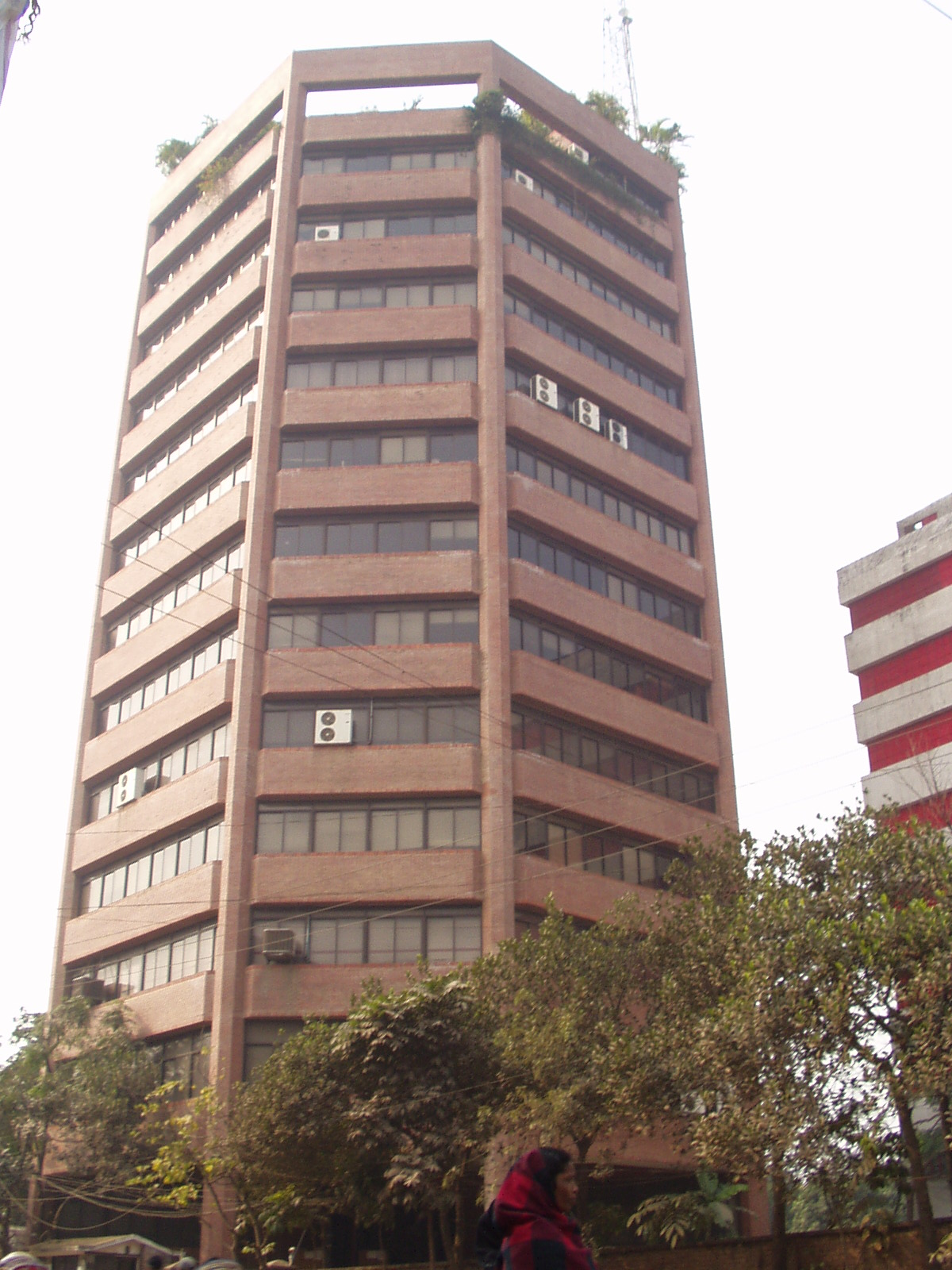
Proshika building

Mubasshar Hussein (Bengali: মোবাশ্বের হোসেন; 27 December 1943 – 2 January 2023) was a Bangladeshi architect, urban planner and educator. He served as President of Institute of Architects Bangladesh.

== Early life and education ==
Mubasshar Hussein was born in Wari, Bangladesh on 27 December 1943. He graduated in architecture from Bangladesh University of Engineering and Technology in 1972.

== Career ==
Mubasshar Hussein was the principal architect of Assoconsult Ltd. He was the President of Commonwealth Association of Architects. He also served as the president of Architects Regional Council, Asia ARCASIA.

== Personal life and death ==
Hussein died on 2 January 2023, at the age of 79.

== Notable works ==
- Proshika Bhaban
- Grameen Bank Building

== Awards ==
- AIA President Medal, 2009
- IAB Gold Medal, 2018
