= List of Bangladesh University of Engineering and Technology alumni =

This is an incomplete list of notable alumni of the Bangladesh University of Engineering and Technology.

== Academia ==
- Ainun Nishat, academic, hydrologist and climate change specialist
- Abdul Matin Patwari, 4th vice-chancellor of BUET
- A. M. M. Safiullah, 10th vice-chancellor of BUET
- A.K.M. Fazle Hussain, academic at the University of Houston, recipient of the highest awards of the American Physical Society, American Society of Mechanical Engineers and American Institute of Aeronautics and Astronautics
- Alee Murtuza, 9th vice-chancellor of BUET
- Iqbal Mahmud, 7th vice-chancellor of BUET, recipient of the Ekushey Padak in the year 2005
- Jamilur Reza Choudhury, National Professor of Bangladesh, academic at several Bangladeshi universities, renowned civil engineer, former Adviser (Minister) to Caretaker government of Bangladesh, former president of the Institution of Engineers, Bangladesh and ex-president of the Bangladesh Mathematical Olympiad, recipient of the Ekushey Padak in the year 2017
- Kazi Khaleed Ashraf, academic, architect, professor at the University of Hawaii
- Khaleda Ekram, academic, architect and first female vice-chancellor of BUET
- Latifur Khan, tenured professor and researcher at the University of Texas at Dallas, alumnus of the first batch to graduate from the Computer Science and Engineering Department of BUET in 1993
- M. Feroze Ahmed, professor and civil engineer, notable for his collaboration with MIT to understand the mechanism of arsenic contamination of groundwater in Bangladesh
- M. A. Rashid, first vice-chancellor of BUET.
- M Rezwan Khan, distinguished lecturer of Institute of Electrical and Electronics Engineers for the year 2017-18, recipient of Bangladesh Academy of Sciences Gold Model award for contribution to physical sciences in 2005.
- M. Sam Mannan, Regents Professor and holder of the T. Michael O'Connor Chair I in the Artie McFerrin Department of Chemical Engineering at Texas A&M University, process safety pioneer in the United States.
- Mohd. Rafiqul Alam Beg, mechanical engineer and vice chancellor of Rajshahi University of Engineering & Technology (2014-2018)
- Mosharaf Chowdhury, associate professor of CSE at the University of Michigan, Ann Arbor, co-creator of Apache Spark
- Muhammed Alamgir, geotechnical engineer and vice chancellor of Khulna University of Engineering & Technology (2010-2018)
- Muhammad Shahjahan, civil engineer and 6th vice-chancellor of BUET
- Musharrof Husain Khan, 5th vice-chancellor of BUET
- Musharraf Zaman, lifelong David Ross Boyd Professor and Aaron Alexander Professor of Civil Engineering, University of Oklahoma (OU). Also serving as the director of Southern Plains Transportation Center situated in OU.
- Nasim Uddin, professor at University of Alabama, Birmingham, fellow of ASCE and notable researcher and author in the field of disaster risk management and structural safety.
- Nooruddin Ahmed, 8th vice-chancellor of BUET
- S. M. Nazrul Islam, 11th vice-chancellor of BUET
- Saiful Islam, 13th Vice-chancellor of BUET. Recipient of Bangladesh Academy of Sciences Gold Model award for contribution to Physical sciences in 1988
- Satya Prasad Majumder, 14th vice-chancellor of BUET
- Sayeed Salam, former vice-chancellor of State University of Bangladesh
- Shahriar Manzoor, lecturer in computer science at Southeast University
- Mohammad Shorif Uddin, vice-chancellor of Green University of Bangladesh.
- M. Enamul Hossain, Statoil Chair in Reservoir Engineering at the Memorial Univerersity of Newfoundland.

== Diplomacy ==
- A. K. M. Shahidul Karim is the current Bangladesh ambassador to Denmark since July 2022. Prior to this position he served as the ambassador to Bhutan.
- Kamrul Ahsan is the Ambassador to the Russian Federation. He was High Commissioner to Canada and Singapore
- Mahbub Hassan Saleh is a Bangladeshi diplomat and Ambassador of Bangladesh to Belgium, Luxembourg, and the European Union.
- Manjurul Karim Khan Chowdhury is a Bangladeshi diplomat and the Ambassador of Bangladesh to Iran and the former Ambassador of Bangladesh to Myanmar.
- Saida Muna Tasneem is a diplomat who has served as High Commissioner of Bangladesh to the United Kingdom and Ambassador to Ireland and Liberia
- Salahuddin Noman Chowdhury is a Bangladeshi diplomat and ambassador of Bangladesh to Nepal. and the former Deputy High Commissioner of Bangladesh to India.
- A. K. M. Shamsuddin, retired secretary and former High Commissioner of Bangladesh to Kenya.

== Engineering and architecture ==
- Fazlur Rahman Khan, a Bangladeshi-American structural engineer and architect, considered the "father of tubular designs for high-rises", recipient of the Independence Day Award in the year 1999 which is the highest state award given by the Government of Bangladesh
- Ehsan Khan, architect, designer of Mausoleum of Sheikh Mujibur Rahman
- Kashef Mahboob Chowdhury, architect and winner of Aga Khan Award for Architecture in 2016
- Marina Tabassum, architect and winner of Aga Khan Award for Architecture in 2016
- Mubasshar Hussein, architect, former president of the Institute of Architects Bangladesh
- Mustapha Khalid Palash, architect
- Syed Mainul Hossain, architect, designer of the National Martyrs' Memorial of Bangladesh, recipient of Ekushey Padak in the year 1987
- Masudur Rahman Khan, architect

== Entrepreneur ==
- Mohammad Fazlul Azim, chairman of Azim Group, a leading garments company in Bangladesh. A prominent industrialist and pioneer of Bangladesh RMG sector. Former member of parliament for Noakhali-6 constituency
- Kutubuddin Ahmed, founder and chairman of the Envoy Group
- Mahmudul Hasan Sohag, CEO and co-founder of Rokomari.com, founder of Udvash Coaching Center and Onnorokom Group, developer of EVM
- S. M. Kamaluddin, founder and chairman of Concord Group

== Literature, media and entertainment ==
- Abul Hayat, National Film Award winning actor from Bangladesh and civil engineer, recipient of Ekushey Padak in the year 2015
- Anisul Hoque, writer, novelist, journalist
- Aupee Karim, National Film Award winning Bangladeshi actress, model and faculty member at architecture school of American International University-Bangladesh
- Babna Karim, mechanical engineer, musician, Bassist and former member of Bangladeshi music band Warfaze
- Gazi Rakayet, National Film Award winning Bangladeshi film director, actor and a civil engineer
- Habibullah Siraji, poet and former director general of Bangla Academy, recipient of Ekushey Padak in the year 2016
- Mahfuzul Hasan Bhuiyan, architectural photographer
- Mahmudur Rahman, Editor, Dainik Amar Desh
- Naveed Mahbub, comedian, columnist, electrical engineer
- Shakoor Majid, architect, writer and photographer
- Tanzir Tuhin, architect, musician and former member of Bangladeshi music band Shironamhin
- Tauquir Ahmed, Bangladeshi architect, National Film Award winning film director, actor
- Ziaur Rahman Zia, architect, musician and founder of Bangladeshi music band Shironamhin
- Mehedi Haque, Bengali cartoonist, editor
- Wahid Ibn Reza, Bangladeshi engineer, animator, screenwriter, film director, actor, poet and writer. He works in Hollywood film and television industry in visual effects (VFX), animation and production management.
- Ahmad Mostofa Kamal, Bangladeshi writer and academic.
- Mirza Tanjim Shorif Mugdho, Bangladeshi singer, educator, mathematician, civil servants and computer scientist. He became widely known after winning the 2010 season of Channel i Shera Kontho.

== Military ==
- Lieutenant general Muhammad Mahbubur Rahman, 8th Chief of Army Staff (CAS) of Bangladesh Army, a freedom fighter under Z Force (Bangladesh)
- Abul Hossain, an army major general, former director-general of BGB, former engineer-in-chief of the Bangladesh Army and former commandant of the Military Institute of Science and Technology
- Major General Md Jubayer Salehin, former engineer-in-chief of the Bangladesh Army
- Shafi Imam Rumi, guerilla fighter of the Bangladesh Liberation War
- S I M Nurunnabi Khan, freedom fighter and writer. Recipient of Bir Bikrom award for gallantry in Bangladesh Liberation War
- Vice Admiral Mohammad Moyeenul Haque, assistant chief of naval staff (material)
- Major General Siddiqur Rahman Sarker, engineer-in-chief of the Bangladesh Army (2015-2019)
- Major General Ibne Fazal Shayekhuzzaman, engineer-in-chief of the Bangladesh Army (2019-2022)
- Major General Moin Uddin, Ex-Chairman of Bangladesh Rural Electrification Board, retired major general of the Bangladesh Army.

== Politics and government ==
- Abdus Sabur, science and technology affairs secretary of the Bangladesh Awami League, also the former member of parliament from Comilla-1
- G M Quader, mechanical engineer, politician and former minister of several ministries of Bangladesh
- Hasanul Haque Inu, politician, former minister of information of Bangladesh
- Kamrul Ahsan, diplomat and former civil engineer, former dean of the Asia Pacific diplomatic group in Canada
- Siraj Sikder, Bangladeshi revolutionary politician
- Yafes Osman, architect, politician and former minister of science and technology, Bangladesh
- M. Iqbal Hossain, politician and minister of state
- Abrar Fahad, victim of campus violence by Bangladesh Chatra League and martyr for student activism in Bangladesh
- AKM Rehan Ahsan, student killed in the 2013 Shapla Square Protests
