= Holy Cross College, Dhaka =

Private Intermediate college for girls in Bangladesh

Holy Cross College
- হলি ক্রস কলেজ
- Crest of Holy Cross College, Dhaka

Location
- Tejgaon, Dhaka; Bangladesh; 23.7584°N 90.3912°E

Information
- Type: Private College
- Motto: Spes Unica
- Religious affiliations: Catholic Church (Sisters of the Holy Cross)
- Established: 1950; 76 years ago
- Founder: Augustine Marie CSC
- School board: Board of Intermediate and Secondary Education, Dhaka
- Principal: Shikha Laetitia Gomes
- Grades: 11–12
- Female
- Enrollment: 1200
- Language: Bengali and English
- Hours in school day: 4 hours 40 minutes
- Campus: Urban, 0.735 acres (2,970 m^{2})
- Campus size: 0.735 acres (2,970 m^{2})
- Color: White
- Nickname: HCC
- Team name: Spartans & Trojans
- Publication: Annual magazine Scribe & Science magazine Kendrika
- Demonym: Crossians
- Website: hcc.edu.bd

Holy Cross College (HCC) (Bengali: হলি ক্রস কলেজ) is a Catholic higher-secondary school for girls, located at Tejgaon in Dhaka, Bangladesh. It serves students of class 11 and class 12. It was founded in 1950 by the Sisters of the Holy Cross.

== Notable alumni ==
- Shirin Sharmin Chaudhury, former speaker of Bangladesh National Parliament
- Dipu Moni, former education minister of Bangladesh
- Rubana Huq, Vice-Chancellor of Asian University for Women
- Subarna Mustafa, actress and politician
- Meerjady Sabrina Flora, Bangladeshi epidemiologist
- Justice Salma Masud Chowdhury, justice of the Supreme Court of Bangladesh
- Justice Naima Haider, justice of the Supreme Court of Bangladesh
- Justice Farah Mahbub, justice of Supreme Court of Bangladesh
- Nihad Kabir, lawyer, president of FBCCI
- Sonia Bashir Kabir, Bangladeshi businessperson
- Shusmita Amin Chowdhury, socialite
- Saida Muna Tasneem, Diplomat, High Commissioner for Bangladesh to the United Kingdom, Ambassador to Ireland, Liberia
- Tasnia Farin, Actress
- Marina Tabassum, Architect
- Nawzia Yasmin, Pro-Vice Chancellor of the State University of Bangladesh
- Sultana Kamal, Bangladeshi lawyer and human rights activist
- Shila Ahmed, Former Bangladeshi television and film actress
- Karishma Sanu Sovvota, Singer

== See also ==
- Holy Cross Girls' High School (Dhaka)
- Notre Dame College, Dhaka
- St. Joseph Higher Secondary School
