= Azimpur Government Girls' School and College =

Coordinates: 23.725°N 90.387°E

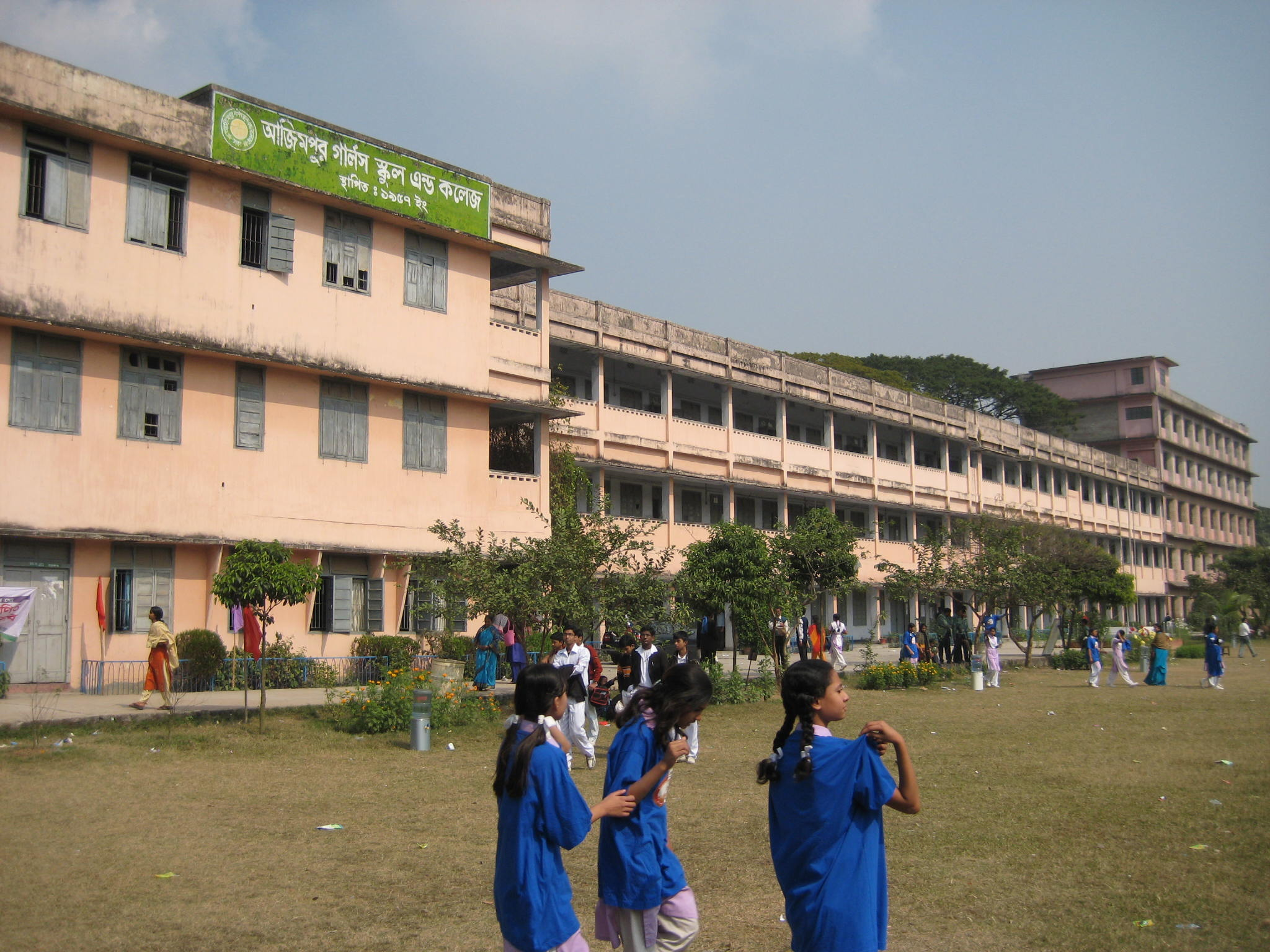
- Azimpur Girls School and College building
- Azimpur, Dhaka; Bangladesh

Information
- Type: Government school and college
- Motto: Knowledge is power
- Established: 1957
- School district: dhaka
- Principal: salah uddin
- Grades: 1-12
- Enrollment: 10000 in average
- Colors: purple, white

Azimpur Government Girls' School and College (Bengali: আজিমপুর গভর্নমেন্ট গার্লস স্কুল এন্ড কলেজ) is a secondary and higher secondary school in Azimpur, Dhaka, Bangladesh. It was established in 1957 by the Welfare Association of Government Employees. In 1999 the school had an enrollment of some 2,700 students and a faculty of 82.

The institution is known for its cultural activities. It hosts educational events like Bangladesh Mathematics Olympiad and Bhasha Protijog. The school celebrated its Golden Jubilee and reunion in 2007.

The school started its classes in 1957. The first Head Master was Kazi Ambor Ali. In 1995, Azimpur Girls' College was established on the school campus. Both school and college united into a single institution in 1999.

It has nearly 7000 students and 92 teachers in total. The Principal is Geetanjali barua. Property of the institution includes 4 buildings, a large playground, a duplex auditorium and a residence for the principal.

== Notable alumni ==
- Sheikh Hasina - former Prime Minister of Bangladesh (1996–2001) and (2009–2024)
- Nawzia Yasmin - Pro-Vice Chancellor of the State University of Bangladesh
