= Nawzia Yasmin =

Bangladeshi academic

The Honourable Nawzia Yasmin
- নাওজিয়া ইয়াসমিন
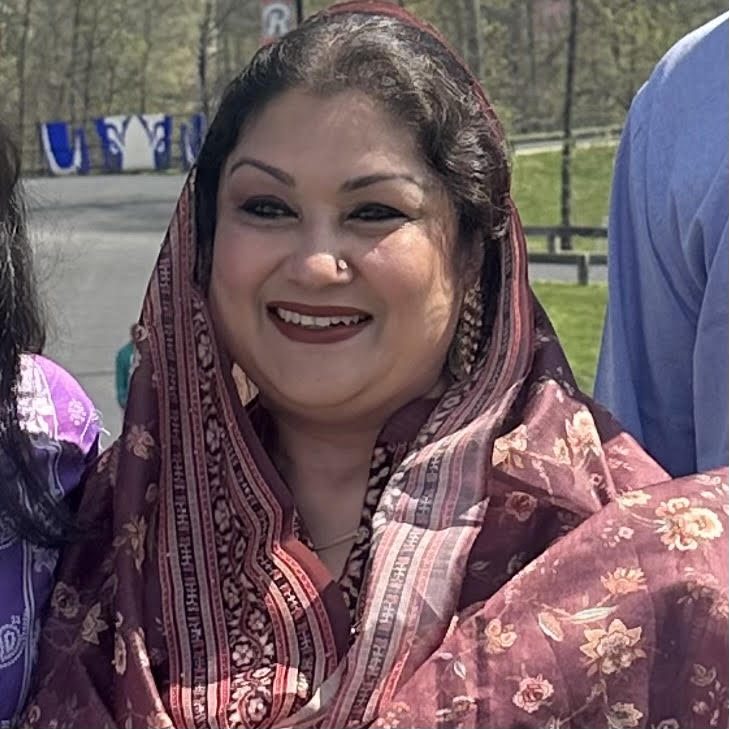
- Yasmin c. 2024

Pro-Vice Chancellor of the State University of Bangladesh
- Incumbent
- Assumed office 1 January 2022
- Chancellor: President Mohammed Shahabuddin

Acting Vice Chancellor of the State University of Bangladesh
- In office 1 February 2023 – 23 June 2025
- Preceded by: Md. Anwarul Kabir
- Succeeded by: Md. Akhter Hossain Khan

President of the Bangladesh Tobacco Control Research Network
- Incumbent
- Assumed office 3 November 2018
- Preceded by: Sohel Reza Choudhury

Personal details
- Born: 5 August 1966 (age 60) Dacca, East Pakistan, Pakistan
- Spouse: Mohammed Kabirul Islam (m. 1990)
- Children: 2
- Education: Dhaka Medical College (MBBS); University of Sydney (MPH); Jahangirnagar University (PhD)
- Occupation: Physician, academic, professor
- Website: https://www.sub.ac.bd/pro-vice-chancellor

Nawzia Yasmin (Bengali: নাওজিয়া ইয়াসমিন; born 5 August 1966) is a Bangladeshi academic and physician. She is the pro-vice chancellor of the State University of Bangladesh and the president of the Bangladesh Tobacco Control Research Network.

== Early and personal life ==
Yasmin was born on 5 August 1966 in Dacca, East Pakistan. She attended Azimpur Government Girls' School and then matriculated into Holy Cross College in 1983. She was admitted to Dhaka Medical College in 1986 and graduated with high distinction. On 3 December 1990, Yasmin married Mohammed Kabirul Islam. Islam is a civil engineering professor at the Bangladesh University of Engineering and Technology (BUET) and the nephew of former Bangladesh finance secretary Mohammed Matiul Islam and former governor of Bangladesh bank Mohammad Nurul Islam. Together, Yasmin and Islam have two daughters.

== Education ==
Yasmin completed her Bachelor of Medicine, Bachelor of Surgery in 1993 at the Dhaka Medical College. She completed her Master of Public Health in 2000 at the University of Sydney. In 2001, she completed a certificate course in ultrasonography at the Bangladesh Institute of Medical and Dental Technology. As of 2024, Yasmin is pursuing her PhD in public health at Jahangirnagar University.

== Career ==
Yasmin joined the Department of Public Health at the State University of Bangladesh in 2003.

In 2008, Yasmin was appointed editor of the SUB Journal of Public Health. Yasmin has supervised more than 600 graduate thesis. She is a member of the Bangladesh Medical Association, Bangladesh Medical and Dental Council and Public Health Association of Bangladesh.

Yasmin, dean of the School of Health Sciences at State University of Bangladesh, signed a pledge in 2017 to reject funding from the Foundation for a Smoke-Free World, which is funded by Philip Morris International, along with university administrators from around the world. On 3 November 2018, Yasmin was elected to serve as the president of the Bangladesh Tobacco Control Research Network. Yasmin was the proctor of the State University of Bangladesh in 2019.

She served as the Dean of the School of Pharmacy and Health Sciences and Head of the Department of Public Health at the State University of Bangladesh. In January 2022, Yasmin was appointed to be the pro-vice chancellor of the State University of Bangladesh by then President Mohmmad Abdul Hamid. From February 2023 to June 2025, Yasmin acted as the vice chancellor of the State University of Bangladesh until Md. Akhter Hossain Khan assumed office in late June 2025. In office, she appointed Mohammed Hassan Kawsar as the treasurer of the State University of Bangladesh.

Beyond academic administration, Yasmin has produced approximately 38 peer-reviewed publications, primarily in the domains of public health, maternal and child health, non-communicable diseases (NCDs), and preventive medicine.
