= Mihir Ranjan Halder =

Bangladeshi engineer

Mihir Ranjan Halder is a Bangladeshi academic, engineer, and former Vice-Chancellor of Khulna University of Engineering & Technology (KUET).

== Early life and education ==
Halder earned his Bachelor of Science in Mechanical Engineering at the University of Rajshahi in 1982. He later pursued a M.Sc. degree at the University of Strathclyde in the United Kingdom, which he completed in 1991. In 2002, he obtained a Ph.D. in Mechanical Engineering, specializing in liquid fuel atomization, from the Indian Institute of Technology, Kharagpur.

== Career ==
Halder began his professional journey in 1984 as a Director at the Bangladesh Institute of Technology (BIT), Rajshahi, which is now known as Rajshahi University of Engineering & Technology (RUET). In 1986, he transitioned into academia as a lecturer at the Bangladesh Institute of Technology, Khulna (now Khulna University of Engineering & Technology). Over the years, he advanced through the ranks, becoming an assistant professor in 1987, an associate professor in 2002, and a full Professor in 2004.

Throughout his career, Halder has been actively engaged in both teaching and research. He has held various administrative positions, including Provost of Lalan Shah Hall from 2004 to 2006 and Amar Ekushey Hall from 2008 to 2010 at Khulna University of Engineering & Technology. He has also served as Head of several departments at KUET, including Energy Technology from 2007 to 2008, March–September 2012), Mechanical Engineering from 2010 to 2011), Textile Engineering from 2012 to 2016, and Chemical Engineering from 2018 to 2022. In January 2012, he was a member of a probe committee formed to look into violence by Bangladesh Chhatra League on campus. Additionally, he was a Syndicate member at Rajshahi University of Engineering & Technology from 2015 to 2018 and served as Dean of the Faculty of Mechanical Engineering at KUET from 2016 to 2018.

In April 2024, Halder was appointed vice-chancellor of Khulna University of Engineering & Technology replacing Dr Kazi Sajjad Hossain. He resigned following the fall of the Sheikh Hasina led Awami League government and students protests demanding his resignation. He sought voluntary retirement from the university after his successor, Professor Muhammad Masud, suspended all former top official of the university including Halder.
