= Armanitola Government High School =

Coordinates: 23.7152°N 90.4019°E

Armanitola Government High School, Dhaka-1100
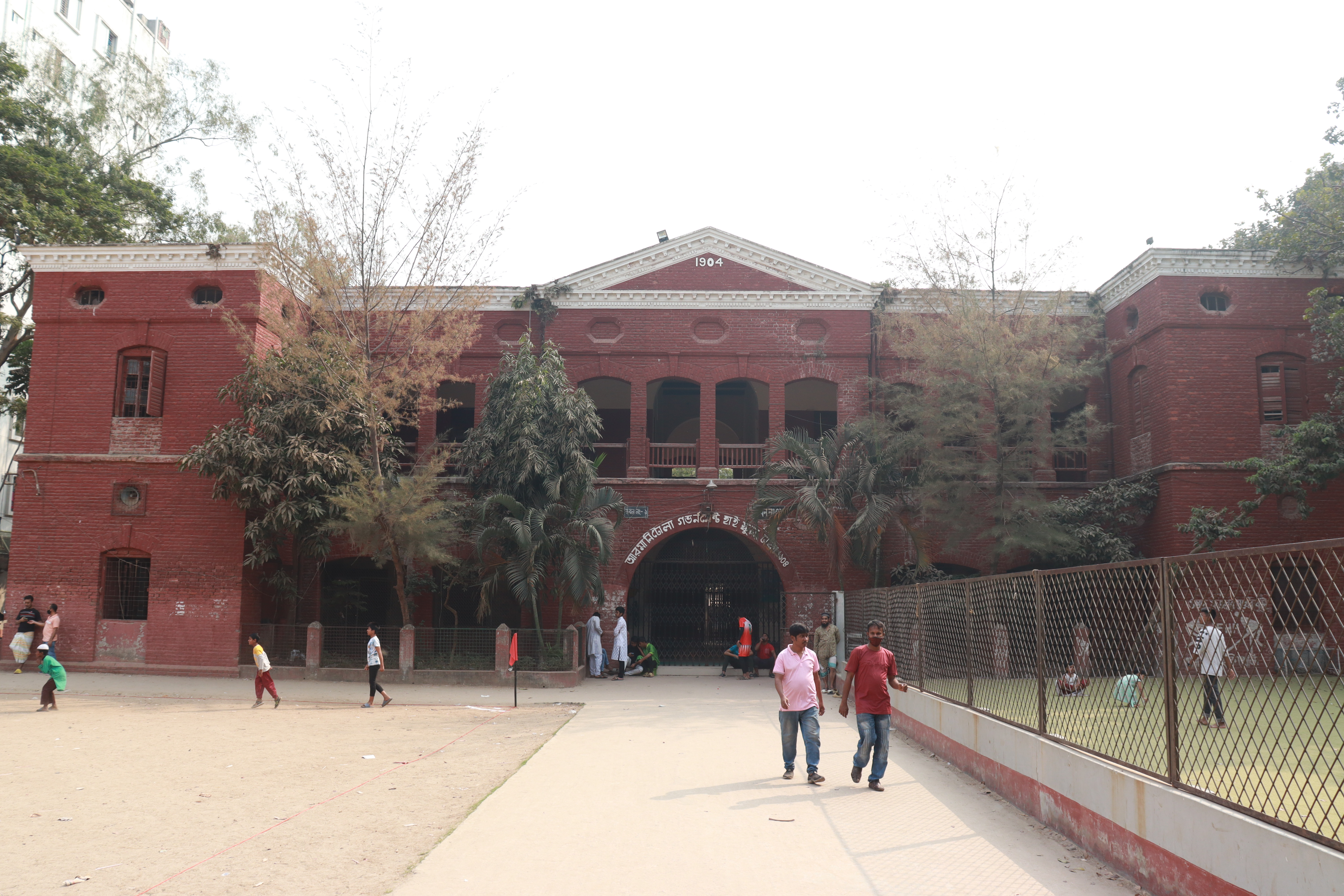
- Old Town, Dhaka; Bangladesh

Information
- Type: Government Secondary and Primary School
- Motto: "Sokoler Tore Sokole Amra, Protteke Mora Porer Tore"
- Established: 1904; 122 years ago
- Principal: A. K. M. Mostofa Kamal
- Faculty: 53
- Gender: Boys
- Enrollment: Almost 2000
- Campus: Urban
- Colors: Blue (pants) and White (shirt)
- Yearbook: Unmesh
- Website: Archived 2023-10-07 at the Wayback Machine

Armanitola Government High School is a secondary school for boys in Armanitola, in the old part of Dhaka, Bangladesh. It celebrated its centenary in 2004.

== History ==
This school was established in 1904 by the British government, as an experimental school of the only teacher training college of East Bengal at that time. The school started at a vast campus with red brick buildings constructed in the British style at a location in front of the Tara Masjid (Star Mosque), a famous monument of Muslim architecture. Within a few years after its establishment, it drew attention of the city dwellers for its performance in education, sports and culture.

The school, however, could not sustain its name and fame during later years, particularly during the Pakistan period. Only by turning it into a government school in 1960 could it be saved from chronic financial crisis. Even after the independence of Bangladesh, it took a long time for the school to recover. Only since 1992 has it started to perform well. Armanitola Government High School is considered one of the best schools in old Dhaka.

== Campus ==
Armanitola Government High School maintains a centralized campus consisting of three multi-storied buildings located at the heart of Armanitola, one of the busiest commercial spots of Old Dhaka. The school has a library, laboratory facilities, and two large and one small play grounds.

== Academics ==
Armanitola Government High School has almost 1500 students, and 53 teachers, of whom 25 are women. The school offers courses in science and business studies.

== Student activities ==
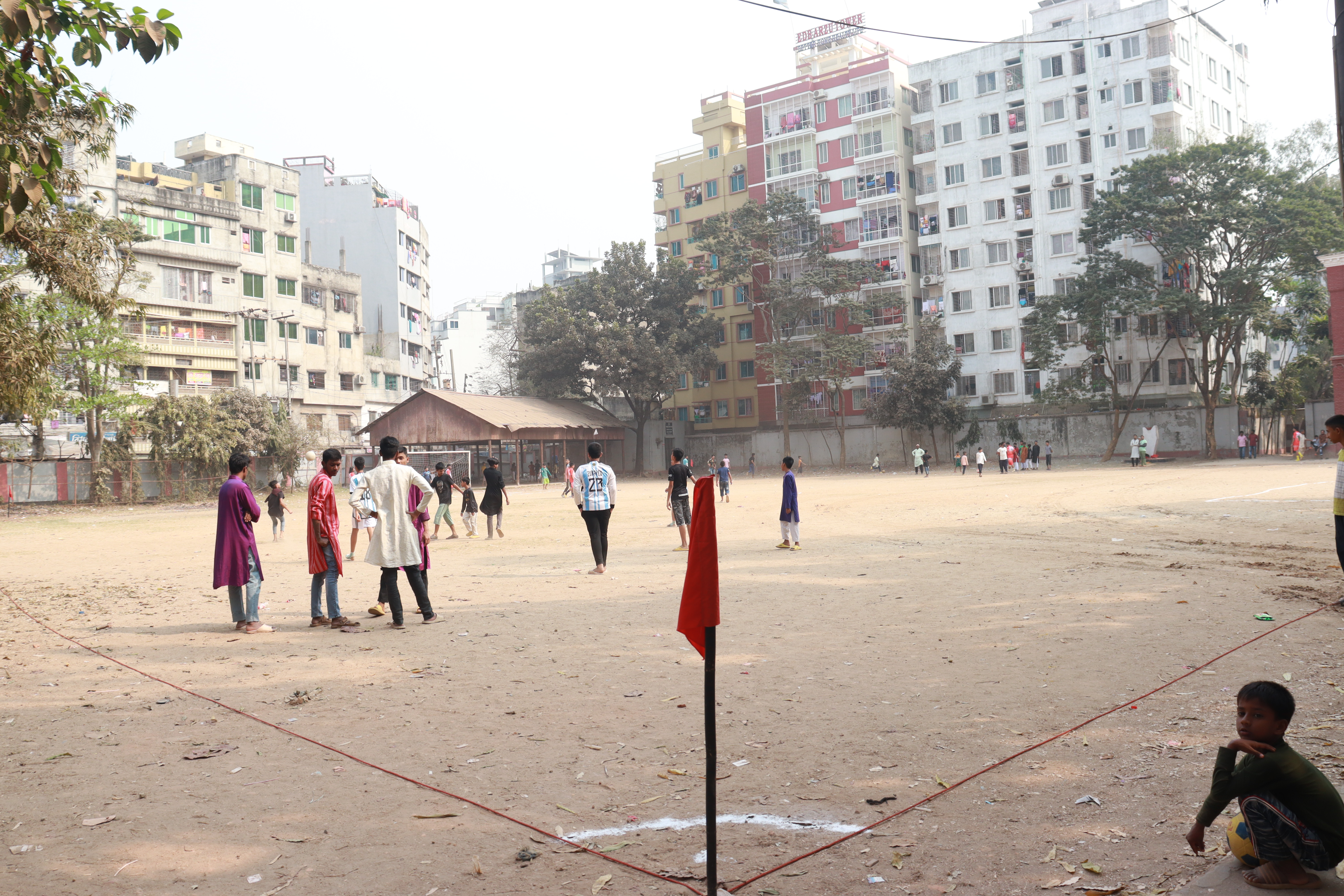
School field of the school

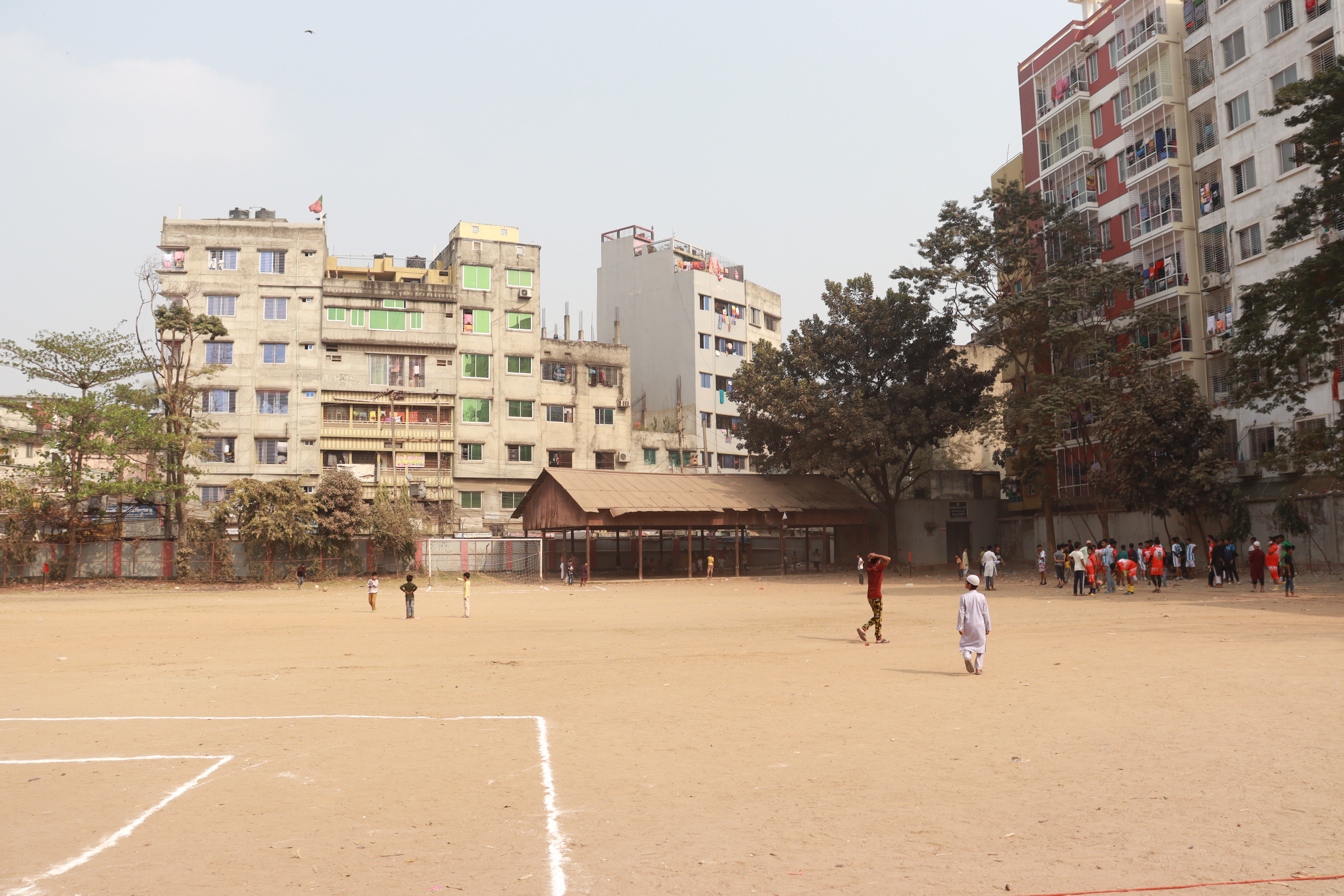
Hockey field of the school

Armanitola Government High School offers many extracurricular activities. The Debating Club in particular regularly competes in inter-school competitions.

== Publications ==
The school publishes an annual magazine named Unmesh.

== Notable alumni ==
- Abdus Sadeque, hockey player
- Anwar Hossain, football player and coach
- Muhammed Abul Manzur, military general
- Pranab Mukherjee, 13th president of India
- Bashir Ahmed, hockey, football, athletics and cricket player, later referee, coach, umpire and Olympic organiser
- Fazlur Rahman Khan, structural engineer and architect
- Muhammad Shahjahan, 6th vice-chancellor of Bangladesh University of Engineering and Technology
- Nooruddin Ahmed, 8th vice-chancellor of Bangladesh University of Engineering and Technology.
- Captain Nurul Huq, 1st Chief of Naval Staff of Bangladesh Navy
