= Muhammed Alamgir =

Bangladeshi academic

Vice Chancellor of Khulna University of Engineering & Technology
- In office 21 July 2010 – 12 August 2018
- Succeeded by: Quazi Sazzad Hossain

Personal details
- Born: 16 June 1963 (age 63)
- Education: Saga University
- Occupation: Academic

Muhammed Alamgir (born 16 June 1963) is a Bangladeshi academic who served as the vice-chancellor of Khulna University of Engineering & Technology.

== Education ==
Alamgir completed his bachelor's and master's from Bangladesh University of Engineering and Technology in 1986 and 1989 respectively. He then earned his Ph.D. from Saga University in 1996.

Alamgir was appointed the vice-chancellor position in August 2014 for the second term. He was appointed to the University Grants Commission in June 2019. After the fall of the Sheikh Hasina led Awami League government, he resigned from the UGC.
