= Kali O Kolom Young Poets and Writers Award =

Bangladeshi literary award

Kali O Kolom Young Poet and Writer Award
- Type: Literary Award
- Country: Bangladesh
- Presented by: Kali O Kolom
- First award: 2008
- Final award: 2008
- Website: http://www.kaliokalam.com/award/

The Kali O Kolom Young Poet and Writer Award (Bengali: কালি ও কলম তরুণ কবি ও লেখক পুরস্কার; Kali o Kolom Tarun Kabi o Lekhok Puroshkar) is a literary award in Bangladesh presented by Kali O Kolom, a magazine on art and literature. It is considered one of the country's most prestigious awards for young writers. The award carries a cash prize of BDT 200,000. It has been presented annually since 2008.

== History ==
The award was established in 2008 to encourage creative work of young Bangladeshi poets and writers. It was introduced by Kali O Kolom in two categories: Poetry and Creative and Intellectual Literature. Over the years, additional categories have been added, including research, children's literature and literature on Bangladesh Liberation War. As of 2024, a total of 67 young writers have received the award.

== Awards by decade ==
Year	Winner	Book	Category	Sources
2008	Simon Zakaria	Bangladesher Lokonatok: Bishoy o Angik-Boichitrya	Research	
2008	Obaid Akash	Shiter Prokar	Poetry	
2009	Ahmed Munir	Ami O Bagharu	Poetry	
2009	Ahmad Mostafa Kamal	Andho Jadukar	Creative literature	
2009	Azizul Parvez	Ekattorer Gonohotya: Rajdhani Theke Beanibazar	Research	
2010	Tokon Thakur	Ta Bhashay Prokash Kora Jay Na	Poetry	
2010	Prashanta Mridha	Golper Khoje	Research	
2010	Kazi Rafi	Dhushor-Swapner Sasandra	Creative literature	
2011	Shubhashis Sinha	Howa Na-Howar Gan	Poetry	
2011	Swakrito Noman	Rajanoti	Creative literature	
2011	Suman Sazzad	Prokriti, Pramitikota O Jatisattar Sahitya	Essays	
2011	Mizanur Khan	Sonar Paramatola	Liberation War literature	
2012	Mostak Ahmad Din	Bhikhirio Rajasthane Jay	Poetry	
2012	Masudul Haque	Dirghoshwashera Hawar Jole Bhase	Fiction	
2012	Piyas Majid	Karun Malyaban O Onnanno	Essays	
2012	Moshtak Ahmed	Nakshatrer Rajarbag	Liberation War literature	
2013	Masud Pathik	Ekaki Jomin	Poetry	
2013	Wahida Nur Afza	Bitangsha	Fiction	
2013	Dr. Robiul Hossain	Samakal Patrikar Sahityik O Sangskritik Bhumika	Research	
2013	Rajib Ahmed	Muktijuddhe Mujibnagar: Dalil O Itihas	Liberation War literature	
2013	Mashudul Haque	Bilu Kalu Ar Gilur Romanchokor Abhijan	Children's literature	
2014	Sakira Parvin	Brishtir Matlami	Poetry	
2014	Fatima Rumi	Ami Anindita	Fiction	
2014	M. Abdul Alim	Pabnay Bhasha Andolon	Research	
2015	Shamim Hossain	Dhaner Dhatri	Poetry	
2015	Imran Khan	Dhatob Shomoy	Fiction	
2015	Ranjana Biswas	Bangladesher Palki O Palkibahak	Research	
2015	Salek Khokon	Juddhodiner Godyo O Pramanyo	Liberation War research	
2016	Naushad Jamil	Dheuyer Bhetor Dabanol	Poetry	
2016	Rafik Hariri	Phulbanu O Onnanno Golpo	Fiction	
2016	Tushar Kabir	Kuthurir Swar	Research	
2016	Hasan Iqbal	Bhatkabitay Muktijuddho	Liberation War literature	
2016	Shariful Hasan	Odbhuture Boighor	Children's literature	
2017	Mizanur Rahman Belal	Jumjuari	Poetry	
2017	Hosne Ara Jahan	Nishinda Patar Ghran	Poetry	
2017	Tapas Roy	Ei Besh Atanke Achhi	Fiction	
2017	Mamun Siddiqui	Muktijuddher Ojana Bhashya	Liberation War literature	
2017	Altaf Shahnewaz	Nrityaki	Research	
2017	Rajib Hasan	Haripada O Gelien	Children's literature	
2018	Nahida Nahid	Juthochari Andharer Golpo	Fiction	
2018	Harun Pasha	Tista	Fiction	
2018	Shahadat Ruman	Humayun Ahmeder Cholochchitro: Chirayat Roshbodh	Research	
2018	Arafat Tanim	Ekattorer Ramjan: Gonohotya O Niryaton	Liberation War research	
2019	Hanzala Han	Jalporider Dwipe	Poetry	
2019	Kamrun Nahar Shila	Lalbeji	Fiction	
2019	Faisal Ahmed	Syed Nazrul Islam: Mahajiboner Protikriti	Research	
2019	Chowdhury Shahid Kader	Muktijuddhe Bharoter Chikitsa Shohayota	Liberation War research	
2020	Mojaffor Hossain	Timirjatra	Fiction	
2020	Masud Parvez	Cholochchitranama	Research	
2020	Ejaz Ahmed Milon	1971: Bidhwasto Bariyay Shudhu Lash Ebong	Liberation War literature	
2020	Ranjit Sarkar	Skule Muktijuddho Hoyechhilo	Children's literature	
2021	Sadat Hossain	Bibha O Bibhram	Fiction	
2021	Amin Al Rashid	Jibananander Manchitra	Research	
2021	Chanakya Baroi	Sundarban Series	Poetry	
2022	Kabir Kallol	Shondeho Hobe Na Keno	Poetry	
2022	Masud Ahmad	Dur Prithibir Gondhe	Fiction	
2022	Nibedita Ray	Kaibarta Jatibarner Itihas	Research	
2022	Mahfuz Rahman	Kong Pahare Shoytan	Children's literature	
2023	Kamrunnahar Dipa	Bhater Kechchha	Fiction	
2023	Sharfin Shah	Jonosongskritir Rup O Rupantar	Research	
2023	Rahman Barnil	Aloy Ranga Bhor	Children's literature	
2024	Austric Rishi	Satitalay	Poetry	
2024	Sajid Ul Haque Abir	Nirbachito Debdut	Fiction	
2024	Muhammad Farid Hasan	Cha-Shramik Andolon: Deadline 20 May 1921	Research	
2024	Swaralipi	Ekattorer Oboruddho Diner Duhsahas: Sagai Fort Escape	Liberation War literature	
2024	Niaz Mahmud	Tilakumarer Jatra	Children's literature	

== See also ==
- Ekushey Padak
- Bangla Academy Literary Award
- Ananda Purashkar
- Sahitya Akademi Award to Bengali Writers
- Rabindra Puraskar
