= Durbar Bangla =

Sculpture of Bangladesh

- দুর্বার বাংলা (Bengali)
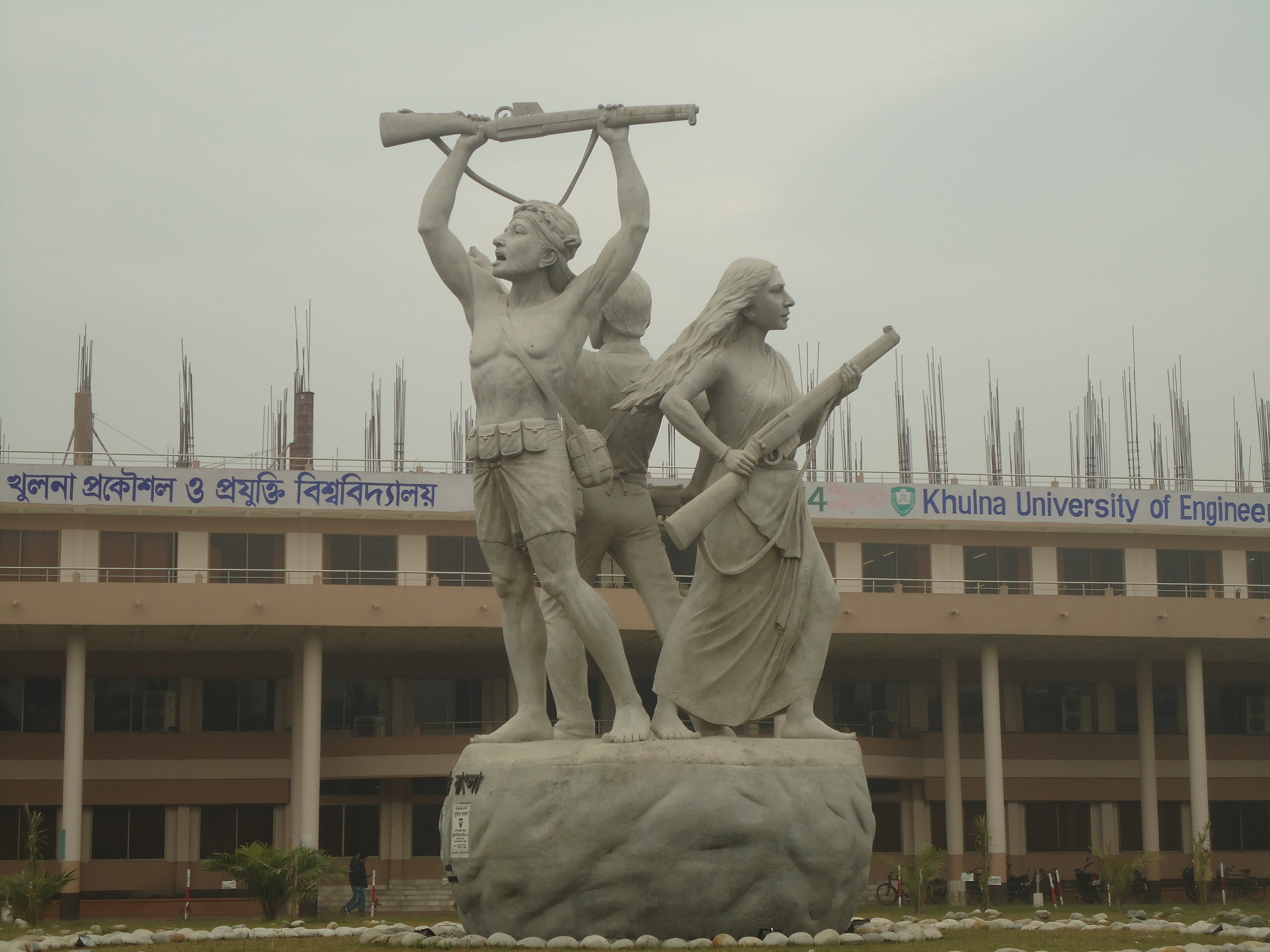
- Durbar Bangla Monument
- Artist: Gopal Chandra Pal
- Year: 2013
- Medium: Concrete
- Subject: Liberation War of Bangladesh
- Location: Khulna; 22.89914°N 89.49720°E
- Owner: Khulna University of Engineering & Technology

The Durbar Bangla (Bengali: দুর্বার বাংলা, lit. 'Impetuous Bengal') monument commemorating the Liberation War of Bangladesh is located on the east side of the administrative building within Khulna University of Engineering & Technology (KUET). It was constructed in 2013 based on the design by Gopal Chandra Pal.

== Description ==
Three liberation fighters are shown in the composite sculpture Durbar Bangla. Every figure on the pedestal is armed and in a triadic stance. The sculpture's central theme is the struggle for survival and fortitude during the freedom movement.
