= Masud Ahmad (author) =

Bangladeshi writer

- মাসউদ আহমাদ
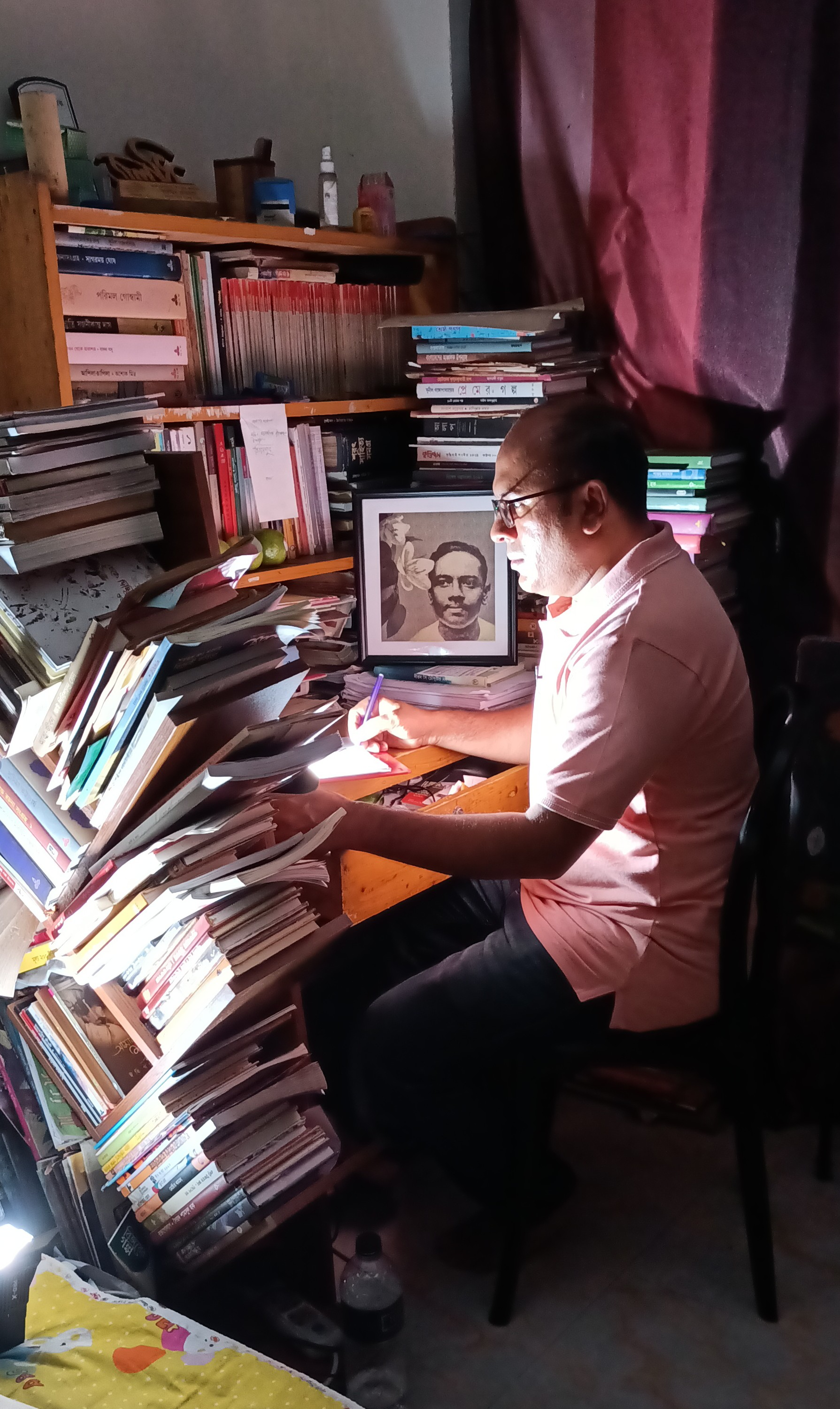
- Born: 5 June 1985 (age 41); Rajshahi District, Bangladesh
- Citizenship: Bangladesh
- Education: University of Rajshahi
- Occupations: Author, journalist, banker
- Awards: Kali O Kolom Young Poets and Writers Award (2022), ABP Ananda Sera Bangali, (2023)

Masud Ahmad (born 5 June 1985) is a Bangladeshi short-story writer and novelist. He received Kali O Kolom Young Poets and Writers Award in 2022 for his short story collection Dur Prithibir Gondhe (The Scent of a Distant World). He is the second person from Bangladesh to receive the ABP Ananda Sera Bangali Award (2023), which he won for his novel Kanchanphuler Kobi (The Poet of Kanchan Flower). The novel was published by Kolkata-based Ananda Publishers. It was also serialized in Desh magazine, making Ahmad the first Bangladeshi author to have one of his novels published in serial form in the magazine.

== Early life and education ==
Ahmad was born on 5 June 1985 in Putia Upazila, Rajshahi District. He completed his primary education at Damdama Government Primary School before moving to Rajshahi. He passed Secondary School Certificate (SSC) examination in 2000 with a first division and Higher Secondary Certificate (HSC) examination in 2002 with a star mark. He later earned both his bachelor's and master's degrees from the University of Rajshahi.

== Career ==
He has been involved in literary writing for many years, with a primary focus on short stories. His first published short story, Kolombondhu (Pen Friend), appeared in the Dhaka-based weekly newspaper Robbar on 24 September 2004.

Ahmad began his career as the editor of the little magazine Golpo Patro. He later worked as a member of the editorial team at Kaler Kantho. He is currently a banker at a leading commercial bank in Bangladesh.

== Published book ==
=== Novels ===
- Nijer Songe Eka (Alone with Myself)
- Rupchaner Ashchorjo Kanna (Rupchan's Strange Tears)
- Kanchanphuler Kobi (The Poet of Kanchan Flower)
- Muniar Osukh (Munia's Illness)
- Titaser Buno Hash (The Wild Ducks of Titas)

=== Short story collections ===
- Jonaik Kobir Smaransabha (Memorial Meeting of a Poet)
- Dur Prithibir Gondhe (The Scent of a Distant World)
- Koyekti Boka Golpo (A Few Foolish Stories)

=== Children's literature ===
- Rushar Khatay Phuler Gondho (The Scent of Flowers in Rusha's Notebook)
- Pinky o Jibanananda Kaku (Pinky and Uncle Jibanananda)

=== Research ===
- Onno Hasan Azizul Haque (Another Hasan Azizul Haque)

== Awards ==
- Kali O Kolom Young Poets and Writers Award (2022)
- ABP Ananda Sera Bangali, (2023)
