= Mohammad Mashud =

Bangladeshi mechanical engineer and Vice-Chancellor

Muhammad Mashud
- মুহাম্মদ মাছুদ
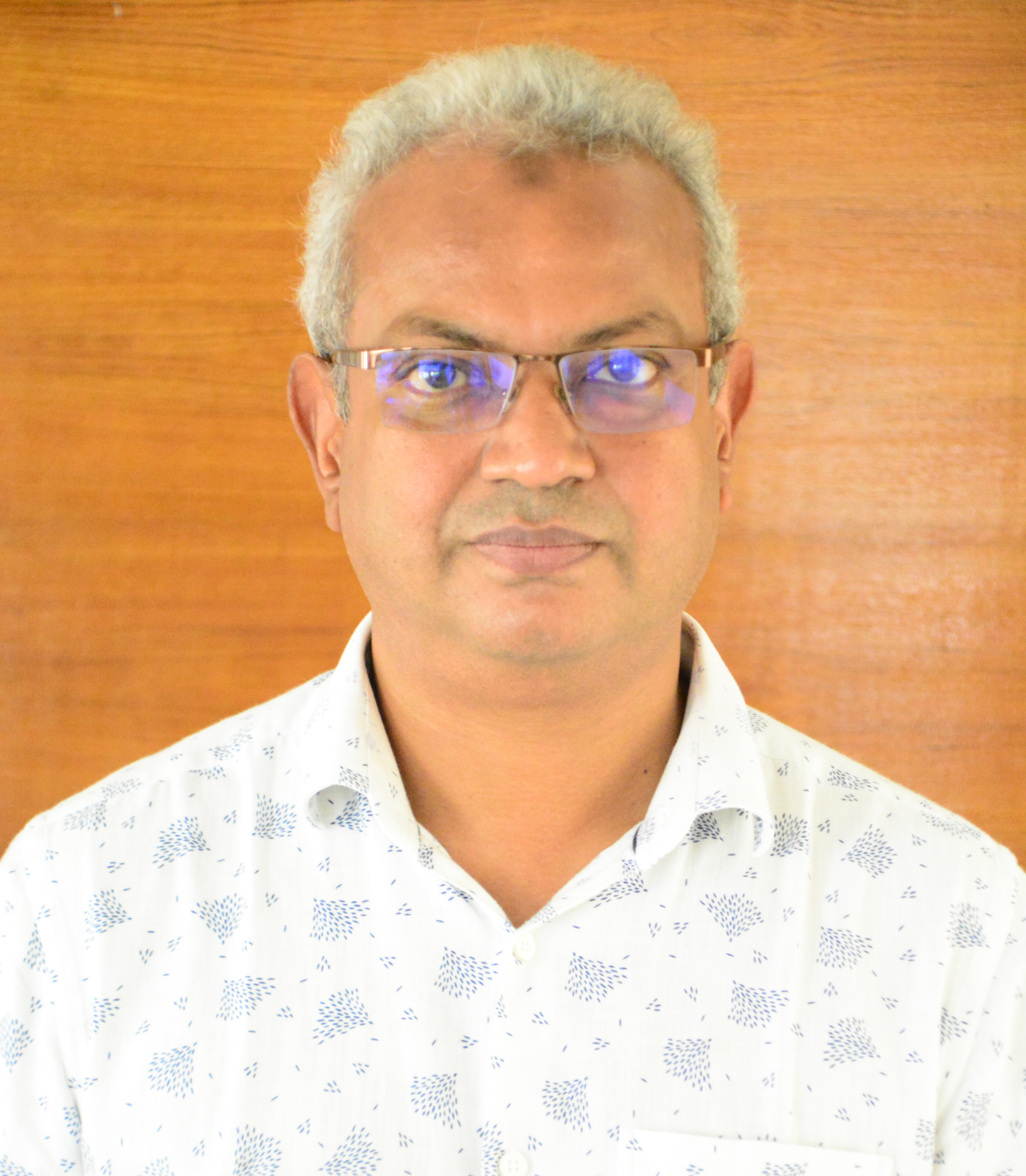
- Mashud in 2024

Vice Chancellor at Khulna University of Engineering & Technology
- Incumbent
- Assumed office 16 March 2026
- Preceded by: Hazrat Ali (interim)
- In office 5 September 2024 – 24 April 2025
- Preceded by: Mihir Ranjan Halder
- Succeeded by: Hazrat Ali (interim)

Personal details
- Born: 1975 (age 50–51) Dhaka, Bangladesh
- Education: Bangladesh Institute of Technology, Khulna; Nagoya University
- Occupation: Professor; university administrator

Muhammad Mashud (Bengali: মুহাম্মদ মাছুদ; born 1975) is a Bangladeshi mechanical engineer and Vice-Chancellor of the Khulna University of Engineering & Technology. He is a professor in the Department of Mechanical Engineering at Khulna University of Engineering & Technology (KUET).

== Education ==
Mashud completed his B.Sc. in Mechanical Engineering from the then Bangladesh Institute of Technology (BIT), Khulna, in 1998. He obtained his M.Sc. in engineering in 2003 and a Ph.D. in 2006 from Nagoya University in Japan.

== Career ==
Mashud began his career as a lecturer in the Department of Mechanical Engineering at BIT Khulna in 1998, which was later upgraded to Khulna University of Engineering & Technology in 2003. He was promoted to assistant professor in 2003, Associate Professor in 2009, and full Professor in 2011.

Alongside Mashud teaching career, Mashud has held several administrative roles, including Head of the Department of Mechanical Engineering at KUET, Hall Provost, Chairman of Consultancy Research and Testing Services, and President and General Secretary of the KUET Teachers' Association. In December 2017, he was suspended along with professors Md Abdullah Al Bari, and Md Hasan Ali for plagiarism.

On September 5, 2024, Mashud was appointed as the Vice-Chancellor of Khulna University of Engineering & Technology following the fall of the Sheikh Hasina led Awami League government. He replaced Mihir Ranjan Halder who resigned in the face of student protests. In February 2025, students at the university protested demanding a ban on student politics and removal of Mashud. He was forced to leave campus in the face of student protests. In response the administration closed the university indefinitely. In April 2025, when university students began a movement and hunger strike to remove him, the Ministry of Education of the Government of Bangladesh decided to remove him from the post of VC on April 24, 2025. He was again appointed in the same post in 2026.
