= Kazi Ambar Ali =

Kazi Ambar Ali is an educator and recipient of the Independence Award, Bangladesh's highest civilian award.

== Career ==
Ali was the second headmaster of Azimpur Girls High School. He is considered one of the founders of the school.

Ali was awarded the Independence Award, Bangladesh's highest civilian award, in 1995.
