= Mahfuzul Hasan Bhuiyan =

Bangladeshi photographer

- মাহফুজুল হাসান ভুইয়া
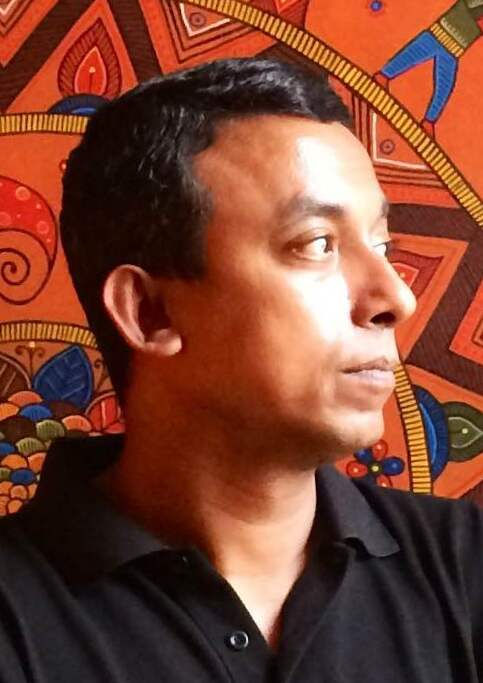
- Born: 19 June 1975 (age 51); Brahmanbaria, Bangladesh
- Occupation: photographer
- Years active: 1992–present
- Known for: architectural photography
- Website: mhrana.com

Mahfuzul Hasan Bhuiyan (Bengali: মাহফুজুল হাসান ভুইয়া) is a Bangladeshi architectural photographer.

== Career ==
Bhuiyan completed his Bachelor of Architecture degree from Bangladesh University of Engineering & Technology. He works as a contract photographer of Zuma Press. And co-founder absurd photos Bangladesh. One of the board Director of Image Colleague Society and United States Photographic Alliance.

His work has been published in National Geographic, Earth shots, World Bank Bangladesh, World Bank Blog, Aristegui News, Mexico, and photoburst.

== Awards ==
=== 1999–2009 ===
- PSA Best of Show- North Georgia Circuit, US, 2009
- PSA Best of Show- Digital Circuit, US, 2009
- PSA Best of Show- Georgia Circuit, US, 2008
- PSA Best of Show- North Georgia Circuit, US, 2007
- PSA Best of Show- Georgia Circuit, US, 2003

=== 2011 ===
- Documentary Award- Humanity Photo Award, China, 2011
- Medal of Excellence- Digital Circuit, US, 2011

=== 2012 ===
- Finalist-Unesco-Unevoc Photo Contest, US, 2012
- STC Gold Medal- 21st Trienberg Super Circuit, Austria, 2012
- Winner- Imagining our Future Together, World Bank, US, 2012

=== 2013 ===
- First Prize- Photographic Angle Photo Contest "Faces", 2013
- PSA Gold Medal- SAM Circuit, India, 2013
- Trophy-Premfoto, Romania, 2013
- First Prize- Health Workers Count Contest, WHO, 2013
- Finalist-"Save the Water" Photo Contest, Australia, 2013
- UPI Gold Medal- EGIAD Municipality Photo Award " Health for All", Turkey, 2013

=== 2014 ===
- First Prize- Ariano Film Festival, Italy, 2014
- PSA Best of Show- Digital Circuit, US, 2014
- Honorable Mention-Manual Rivera Ortiz Foundation Grant, France, 2014
- FIAP Gold Medal- XXXVIII Trofeo Torrets de Fotografia, Spain, 2014
- UPI Gold Medal- PCA Corsica, US, 2014
- First Prize- Photographic Angle Photo Contest "In Pursuit", 2014
- FIAP Gold Medal- Portrait Circuit, Serbia, 2014
- Best Story- SAM Digital Circuit, 2014
- JCM Silver Medal- JCM Circuit, India, 2014
- FIAP Silver Medal- Marmaris Foto Festival, Turkey, 2014
- First Prize- GHF & UNEP Photo Contest " Click, Conserve, Care", India, 2014
- Runner-up- Photographers Forum Magazine Spring Photo Award, US, 2014
- Gold Medal- Asahi Shimbun Photo Contest, Japan, 2014

=== 2015 ===
- UPI Gold Medal & FIAP Bronze Medal, 9th International "Religion in the World and Chimney", Turkey, 2015
- Nomination Award, Humanity Photo Award, China, 2015
- 3rd Prize, Co-Op Hot shots, Singapore, 2015
- AFOCER Medal from A Photo Reporter, Spain, 2015
- 3rd Prize and Diploma in Daily Life Category, Life Press Photo, Ukraine, 2015
- USPA Gold Medal from SWAN International Contest, US, 2015
- PSA Best of Show- Georgia Circuit (GASO), US, 2015
- 2nd Place in Professional Category, International Image Festival (FINI)- "Social Justice", Mexico, 2015
- First Prize & FIAP Gold Medal- 28° Concorso Fotografico Internazionale di San Marino, 2015
- UPI Gold Medal- Portrait Circuit, Serbia, 2015
