= Khulna University of Engineering & Technology =

Engineering university in Bangladesh

- খুলনা প্রকৌশল ও প্রযুক্তি বিশ্ববিদ্যালয়
- Former names: Khulna Engineering College (1967-1986); Bangladesh Institute of Technology (BIT), Khulna (1986-2003)
- Motto: প্রভু! আমায় জ্ঞান দাও
- Motto in English: Oh Lord! Bestow me with Knowledge
- Type: Public research university
- Established: 1967; 59 years ago
- Accreditation: IEB; ITET
- Affiliations: University Grants Commission (UGC)
- Chancellor: President Mirza Fakhrul Islam Alamgir
- Vice-Chancellor: Mohammad Mashud
- Academic staff: 463
- Administrative staff: 699
- Students: 7941
- Undergraduates: 5916
- Postgraduates: 1809
- Doctoral students: 153
- Other students: 63
- Location: Khulna, Bangladesh; 22.900°N 89.502°E
- Campus: 117.48 acres (0.4754 km²); Suburban
- Website: kuet.ac.bd

Khulna University of Engineering & Technology (Bengali: খুলনা প্রকৌশল ও প্রযুক্তি বিশ্ববিদ্যালয়), commonly known as KUET, formerly the BIT Khulna, is a public technological university located in Khulna, Bangladesh. It emphasizes education and research in engineering and technology situated in the southwestern region of Bangladesh. It was founded in 1967 as an engineering college before gradually converting it into a university. KUET is one of the five PhD granting engineering research universities of Bangladesh along with BUET, CUET, RUET, and DUET.

== Academics ==
=== Academic structure ===
The academic division of KUET is organized in 20 departments under 4 faculties. Sixteen departments offer undergraduate courses. Among the Department of Industrial Engineering and Management (IEM) provides an Industrial and Production Engineering (IPE) degree to the undergraduate students.

- Faculty of Civil Engineering
  - Department of Civil Engineering (CE)
  - Department of Urban and Regional Planning (URP)
  - Department of Building Engineering & Construction Management (BECM)
  - Department of Architecture (ARCH)
- Faculty of Science & Humanities
  - Department of Mathematics (MATH)
  - Department of Chemistry (CHEM)
  - Department of Physics (PHY)
  - Department of Humanities and Business (HUM)
- Faculty of Electrical and Electronic Engineering
  - Department of Electrical & Electronic Engineering (EEE)
  - Department of Computer Science & Engineering (CSE)
  - Department of Electronics and Communication Engineering (ECE)
  - Department of Biomedical Engineering (BME)
  - Department of Materials Science and Engineering (MSE)
- Faculty of Mechanical Engineering
  - Department of Mechanical Engineering (ME)
  - Department of Industrial Engineering and Management (IEM)
  - Department of Leather Engineering (LE)
  - Department of Textile Engineering (TE)
  - Department of Energy Science and Engineering (ESE)
  - Department of Chemical Engineering (ChE)
  - Department of Mechatronics Engineering (MTE)

The departments have their own classrooms and laboratories in their respective buildings. The laboratories are equipped with modern instruments and facilities.

=== Number of students ===
University rankings

Global – Overall
- QS World: 1401+ (2026)
- THE World: 1001-1200 (2026)
- Scimago Global: 2770 (2026)

Global – Science and engineering
- THE Engineering: 801-1000 (2026)

Regional – Overall
- QS Asia: 414 (2026)
- THE Asia: 401-500 (2023)

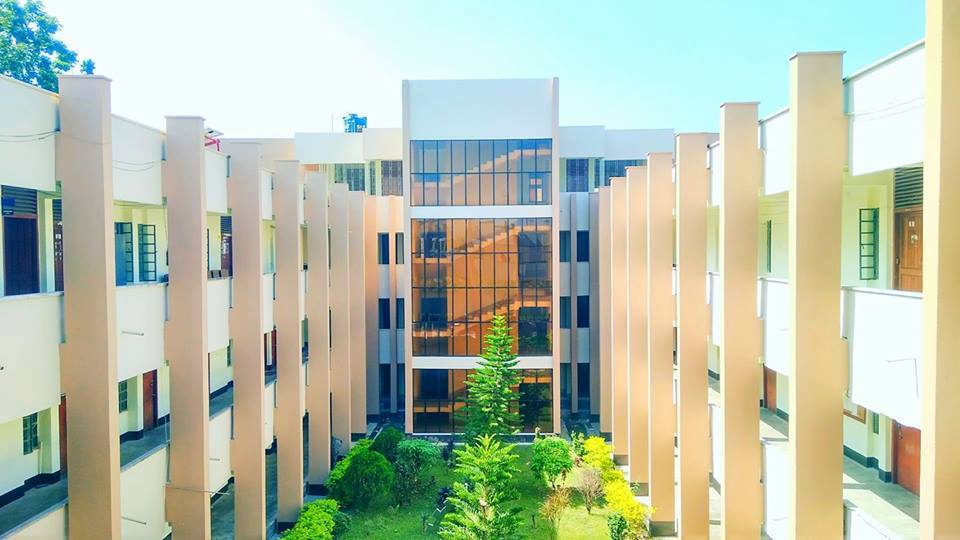
Mechanical Engineering Building, KUET

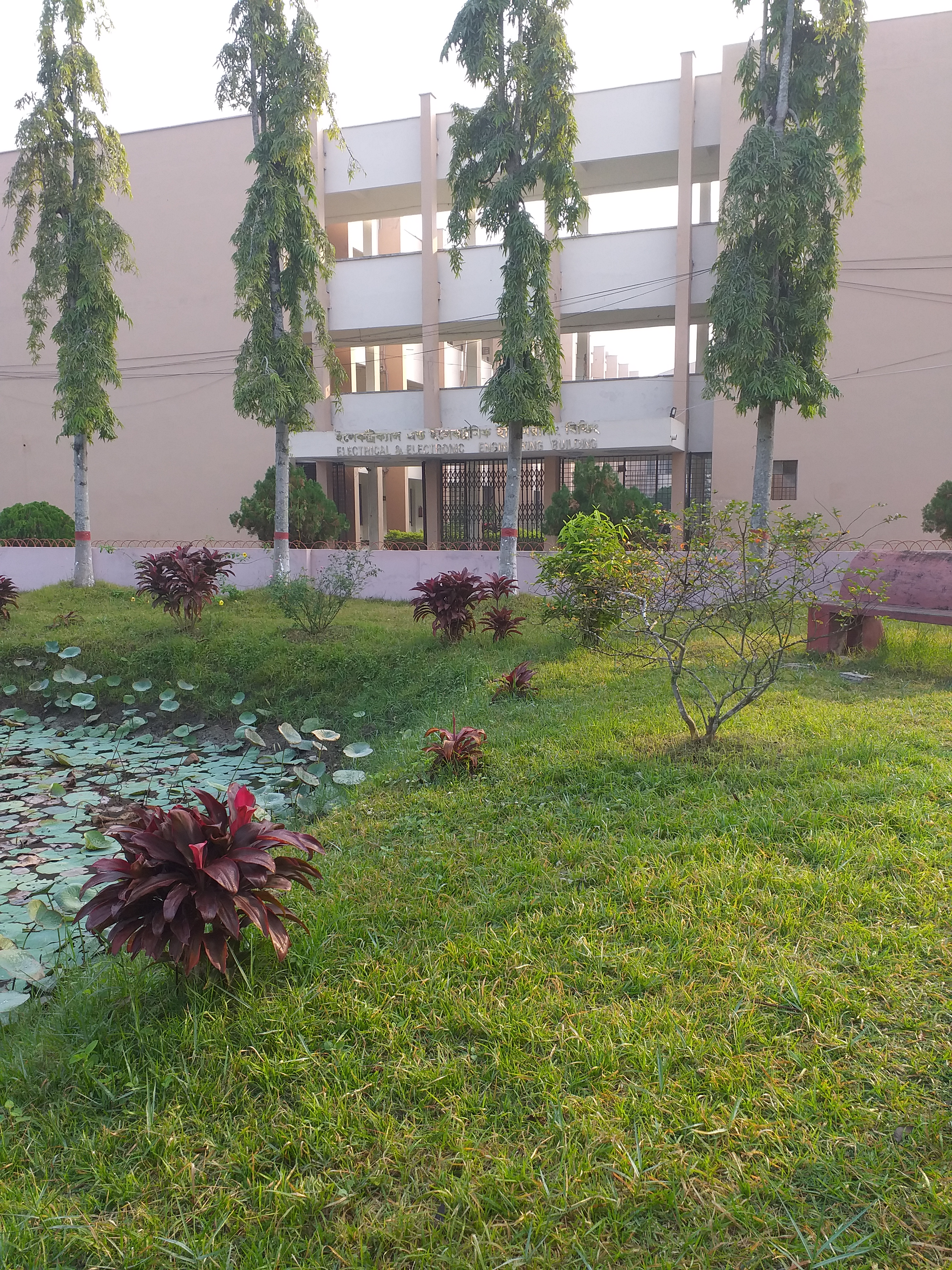
Electrical and Electronic Engineering Building, KUET

Department	No. of Student Freshman Year
Civil Engineering	120
Electrical & Electronic Engineering	120
Mechanical Engineering	120
Computer Science & Engineering	120
Electronics and Communication Engineering	60
Industrial Engineering and Management	60
Building Engineering and Construction Management	60
Biomedical Engineering	30
Materials Science and Engineering	60
Architecture	40
Urban and Regional Planning	60
Leather Engineering	60
Textile Engineering	60
Energy Science and Engineering	30
Chemical Engineering	30
Mechatronics Engineering	30
Total	1060

=== Institutes ===
There are three institutes at KUET for advanced research:

- Institute of Information and Communication Technology (IICT, KUET)
- Institute of Disaster Management (IDM, KUET)
- Institute of Environment and Power Technology (IEPT, KUET)

=== KUET journals and research bulletins ===
- Journal of Engineering Science

=== KUET in World University Rankings ===
KUET has ranked in a number of reputed University rankings. The 2025 QS World University Rankings ranked the university in rank 107 in Southern Asia, 401-410 in Asia and 1201-1400 in the world. The 2023 Times Higher Education World University Rankings ranked the university 401-500 in Asia, and in 2025, it is ranked 1001-1200 in the world and 801-1,000 in Engineering subject ranking.

=== Achievements ===
- A team of students from CSE and IEM, KUET has achieved an Honorable mention at the 2024 ICPC World Final in Kazakhstan.

Following is the position of KUET in the ICPC world final, 2024:

Year	Rank	Question solved
2024	Honourable Mention	3

- 3 teachers from different faculties of KUET have been ranked among the World's Top 2% of Scientists published by Stanford University in 2024.
- A combined team from KUET and BAUET, known as "Team Mohakash", won the global title in the "Best Mission Concept" category in NASA Space Apps Challenge 2021.

== List of Vice-Chancellor ==
Khulna Engineering College

Position: Principal

1. Professor Dr. N. M. Azam (1969–1972)
2. Professor Dr. Md. Shamsuddin Ahmed (1972–1973)
3. Professor Md. Haidar Azam (1973–1974)
4. Professor Md. Abul Kalam Azad (1974–1979)
5. Professor M. A. Hannan (1979–1980)
6. Professor Md. Abul Kalam Azad (1980–1982)
7. Professor M. A. Hannan (1982–1986)

Bangladesh Institute of Technology, Khulna

Position: Director

1. Professor M. A. Hannan (1986–1997)
2. Professor G. M. Habibullah (1997–1998)
3. Professor Dr. M. A. Samad (1998–2002)
4. Professor Dr. Md. Nausher Ali Moral (2002–2003)

Khulna University of Engineering & Technology (KUET)

Position: Vice-Chancellor

1. Professor Dr. Md. Nausher Ali Moral (Acting) (2003–2004)
2. Professor Dr. Ehsanul Haque (2004–2006)
3. Professor Dr. Md. Nausher Ali Moral (Acting) (2006–2007)
4. Professor Dr. Md. Nausher Ali Moral (2007–2010)
5. Muhammed Alamgir (2010–2018)
6. Quazi Sazzad Hossain (2018–2022)
7. Mihir Ranjan Halder (September 1, 2022 – August 12, 2024)
8. Mohammad Mashud (September 5, 2024 - April 24, 2025)
9. Md. Hazrat Ali (interim) (May 1, 2025 – May 22, 2025)
10. Md. Maksud Helali (July 24, 2025- 16 March 2026)
11. Mohammad Mashud (16 March 2026 - present)

== Admissions ==
The admission process in KUET are highly competitive. Each year it opens about 1065 seats for undergraduate programs. About 10,000 applicants are invited to appear on an admission test. This preliminary filtration is done based on H.S.C. grade points in physics, chemistry, mathematics and English. The admission test is standardized to evaluate student ability to understand concepts of physics, chemistry, mathematics, and English language. Admission is offered to successful applicants on a merit basis, based on their scores in the admission test.

Students are admitted to a specific undergraduate academic program specializing in any of the 16 engineering tracks (e.g., CSE, EEE, ME, ECE, CE, IEM, BECM, TE, LE, URP, BME, Arch, ESE, MSE, ChE, MTE). Students may not change their track (major) once a few weeks of classes are passed.

Admission is open to mainly to Bangladeshi nationals. There are 5 reserved seats for "small ethnic group" students who have to undergo the same admission process. A few seats are also open to international students. The international admission process is separate from local admissions

== Campus ==
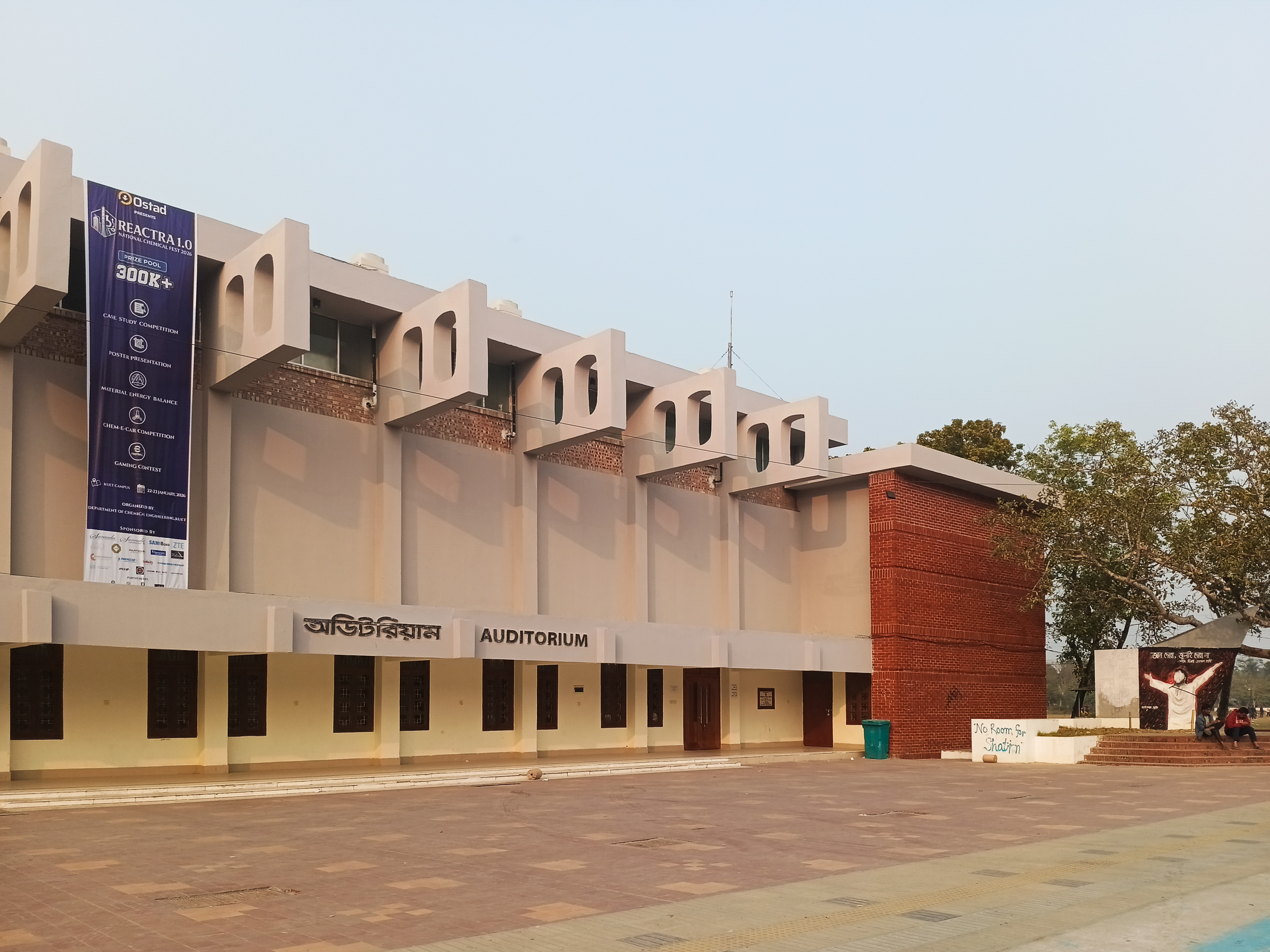
KUET Auditorium

Khulna University of Engineering & Technology (KUET) is at Fulbarigate, the northwest part of Khulna City (the third-largest south-western divisional city in Bangladesh). The campus is about 15 kilometers from the zero point of Khulna City.

The KUET campus covers 117 acres. It is divided into four functional zones: residential zone for students; residential zone for faculty and staff; academic zone for academic buildings and workshops; and cultural-cum-social and recreational zone for students. Being square in shape, the third zone is midway between the two residential zones to reduce walking distances.

The main academic building accommodates the teaching and research facilities. Each department is a separate entity with a courtyard around, and all the departments constitute an integrated complex. Heavy engineering laboratories are on the ground floor or other separate workshops. Light laboratories, classrooms and project rooms are on the upper floors. Separate offices for every member of the teaching staff are next to his/her laboratory.

=== Library ===
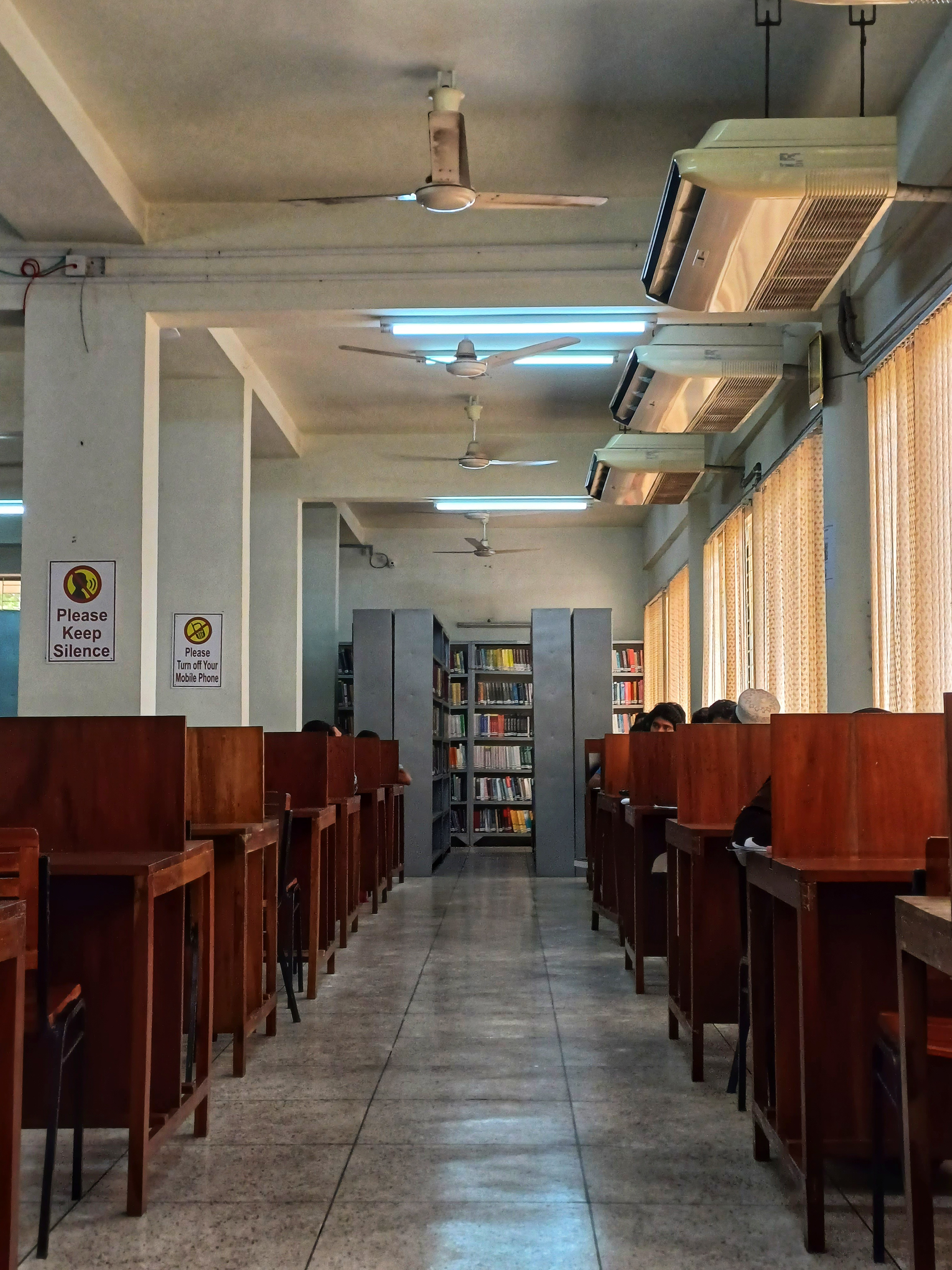
Interior of the KUET Central Library.

KUET central library runs in two sections: the General Library and the Reference Library. The General Library provides in-house reading and short-time borrowing of books and other reference material. The Reference Library provides an in-place reading.

The General Library system has 50,635 books, journals and periodicals. A library automation project to modernize and to improve administrative control over the collection of books, journals, proceedings, theses, etc. has recently been completed under Higher Education Quality Enhancement Project. Moreover, the library is enriched every year by collecting recent books and journals.

Besides the general library system, each academic department maintains a rent-based library from which students can borrow textbooks at a nominal rate for the semester. Recently, KUET library has entered into a full automation system.

=== Medical center ===
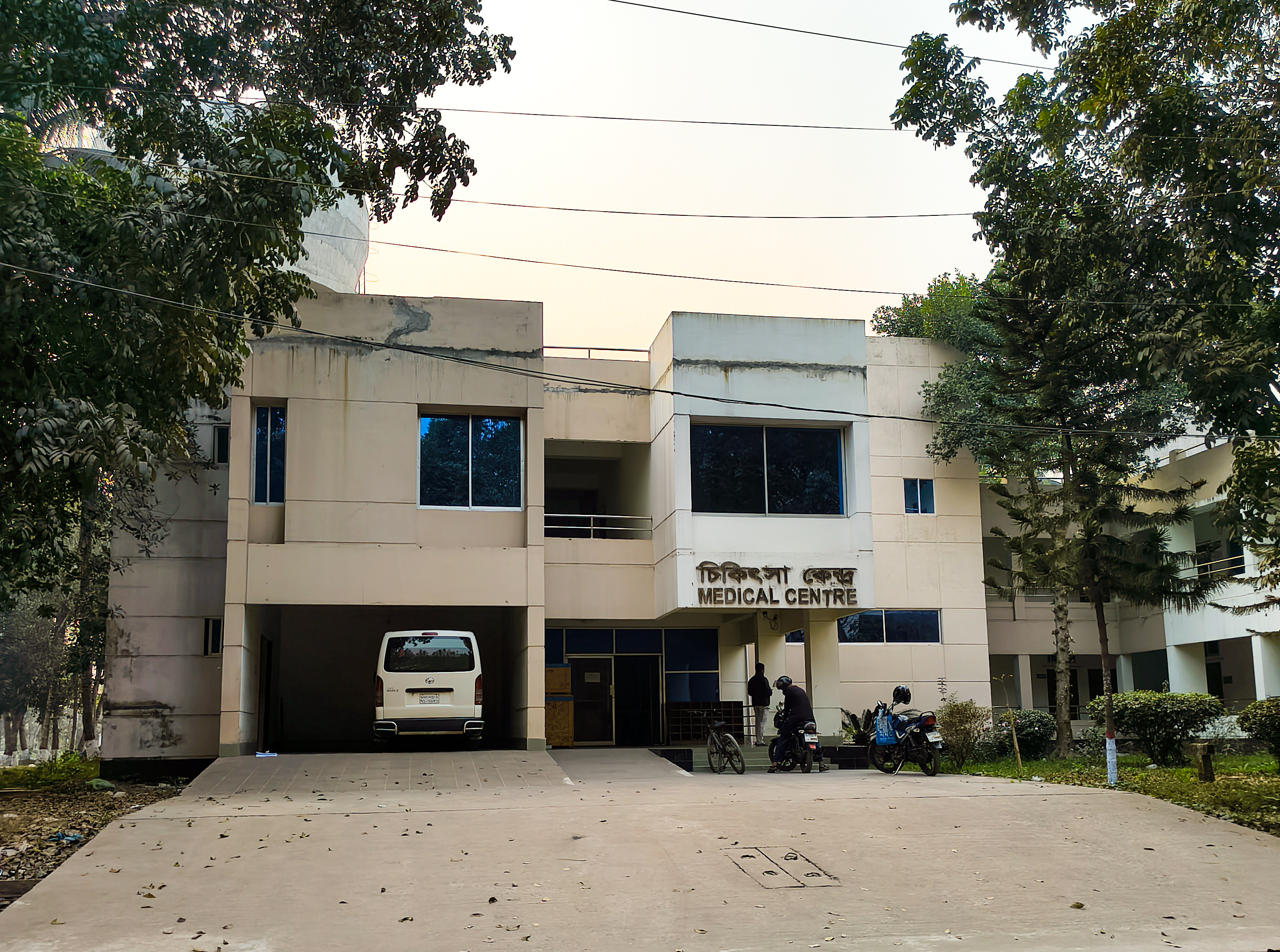
KUET Medical Center

The on-campus, two-storied KUET Medical Center provides primary and basic health care facilities to its students free of charge. 8 full-time MBBS doctors, 2 nurses, 1 Medical Technologist, and 2 staff provide the care. For specialized consultation on complicated cases, medical center refers the patients to specialists through ambulance.

=== Transportation ===
For the convenience of the students, faculties, officers, and staff KUET operates its own Shuttle Bus Service between Khulna City and the campus. On weekends special services are also provided for meeting the weekend recreational and other needs.

=== Central computer center ===
The central computer center (CCC) of KUET was established in 1988 under the supervision of the Department of Electrical and Electronic Engineering with six IBM desktop computers donated by BEXIMCO. To provide a fully integrated set of information support to the teaching, research and administrative functions, in 2006, it became an independent center of KUET in a newly decorated building under the supervision of a nominated chairman from the university.

The CCC has served over the years as the hub for computer-related services in the campus with the commissioning of the university-wide network.

It has strong IT infrastructure with around 256 Mbit/s broadband line from BTCL and BdREN with 1 Mbit/s from other ISP as backup for Internet facility, routers for routing, a firewall for internet security, five high configuration server as mails server, proxy server, database server, seven midlevel configuration of workstations for other servers and backup server, a core switch, several manageable and unmanageable switches for intranet connectivity. It is planned to increase the bandwidth and to expand and renovate the optical backbone network including student halls of residence and teacher residential area secure access of the academic and research materials very soon.

Recently, KUET has started a WiFi network in its director of student welfare (DSW) and CCC arena for students and at the departments of Electrical & Electronic Engineering (EEE) and Electronics, Computer Science and Engineering (CSE), Communication Engineering (ECE) for teachers.

== Student life ==
=== Halls of residence ===
Lalan Shah Hall

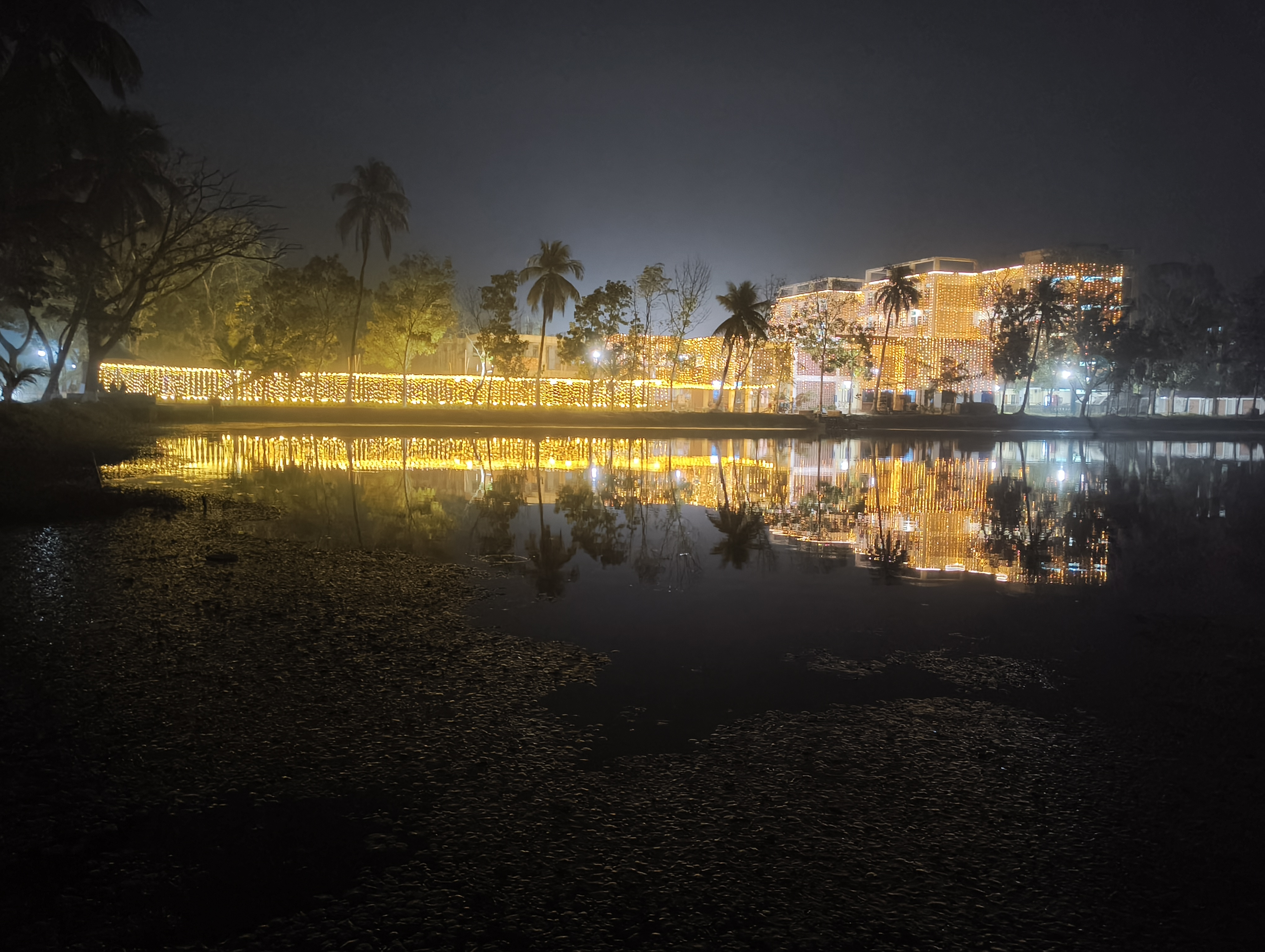
Khaja hall

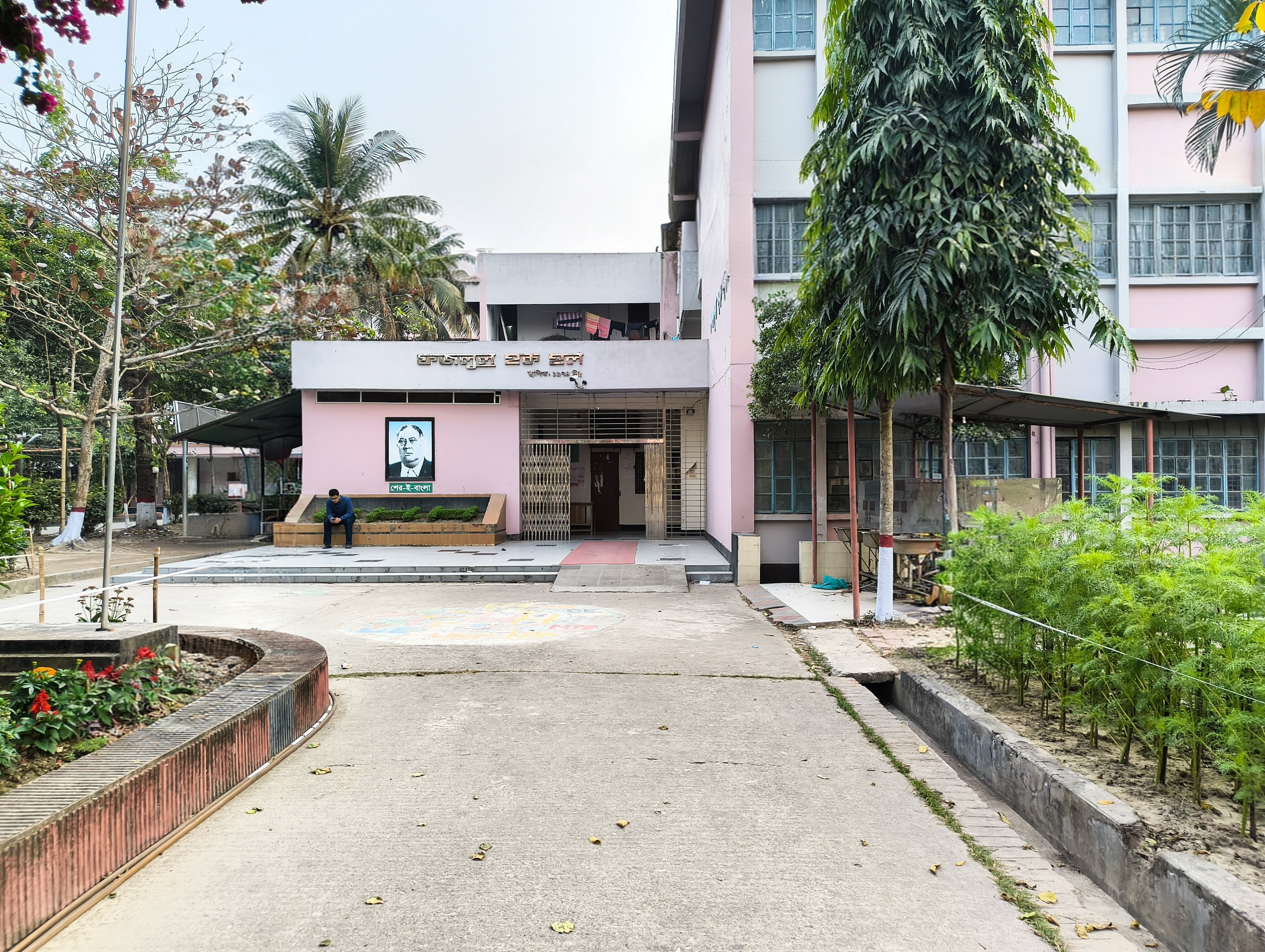
Fazlul Haq hall

There are seven residential halls (one female, six male). The administrative heads of a hall are its provost and assistant provosts. Usually, the halls have a single provost and one or more assistant provosts.

The residential halls provide facilities for the students, for example, hall library, prayer room, TV and recreational room including daily newspapers and magazines, etc. Generally, four students live in a room except for the two-seat rooms in Amar Ekushey Hall arranged for graduate students. These halls have dining rooms (Amar Ekushey Hall has two dining rooms) where monthly prepaid lunch and dinner are offered to the students.

- Shaheed Smrity Hall (Previous name: Bangabandhu Sheikh Mujibur Rahman Hall, named after former president of Bangladesh, Sheikh Mujibur Rahman, renamed on 21 November 2024)
- Amar Ekushey Hall (named in memory of martyrs of the Language Movement )
- Fazlul Haque Hall (named after the 1st Prime Minister of Bengal- Sher-e-Bangla A. K. Fazlul Huq)
- Lalan Shah Hall (named after the Lalon Fokir, Lalon)
- Khan Jahan Ali Hall (named after Muslim Sufi Saint, Khan Jahan Ali)
- Dr. M.A. Rahsid Hall (named after M. A. Rashid, the first vice-chancellor of BUET)
- Rokeya Hall (named after Begum Rokeya Social activist, writer, Muslim feminist)

=== Sports facilities ===
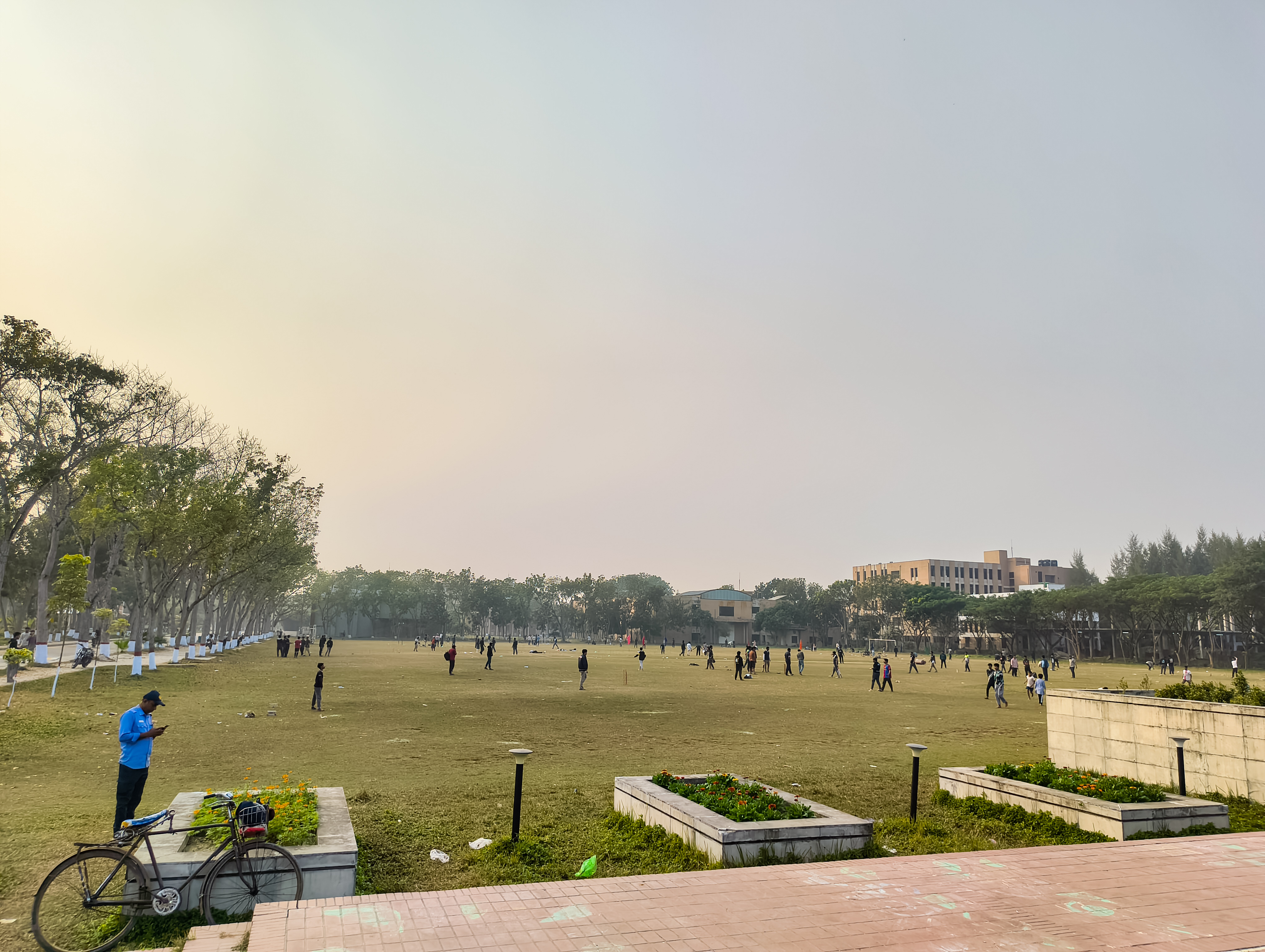
Central field

KUET has a large playground at the eastern periphery of the main academic campus. It is used as venue of annual athletics competition of the university as well as cricket, football competitions. Students can access the facility all year round. KUET has tennis court in the main academic area. It also has a gymnasium near halls of residence where students can do gymnastics.

=== Scholarships ===
- KUET Excellence Scholarship
- Erasmus Mundus Scholarship
- Arif Ahmed Scholarship
- KUETian@Qatar Scholarship
- Dr. Naseem Uddin Scholarship
- Dr. Ramiz Uddin Mollah Scholarship
- KCC FSM Scholarship Programme
- Scholarship for PhD students from "Prime Minister's Research and Higher Education Fund"
- Scholarships from Indian Government 2019
- New Zealand Commonwealth Scholarship, 2019
- Teaching Assistantship or Fellowship

== Notable alumni ==
- Quazi Sazzad Hossain, former Vice-Chancellor of the University
- Mohammad Mashud, current Vice-Chancellor of the University
- Tanbin Islam Siyam, Member of the Avro Keyboard development team, recipient of the 2025 Ekushey Padak.
- Iqbal Hussain Khan, Bangladeshi diplomat
- Md. Delwar Hossain, Bangladeshi diplomat

== See also ==
- List of universities in Bangladesh
- Bangladesh University of Engineering and Technology
- Rajshahi University of Engineering & Technology
- Chittagong University of Engineering & Technology
- Dhaka University of Engineering & Technology
- Durbar Bangla, monument
