= Muhammad Shahjahan =

Bangladeshi academic (1939–2000)

6th Vice-Chancellor of Bangladesh University of Engineering and Technology
- In office 24 April 1991 – 27 November 1996
- Preceded by: Musharrof Husain Khan
- Succeeded by: Iqbal Mahmud

Personal details
- Born: 2 January 1939 Dhaka, Bengal Presidency, British India
- Died: 20 September 2000 (aged 61) Dhaka, Bangladesh
- Education: Ph.D. (civil engineering)
- Alma mater: Dhaka College; Ahsanullah Engineering College; Colorado State University; University of Strathclyde
- Occupation: university academic, professor

Muhammad Shahjahan (2 January 1939 – 20 September 2000) was a Bangladeshi academic. He served as the 6th vice-chancellor of Bangladesh University of Engineering and Technology (BUET).

== Education ==
Shahjahan passed matriculation exam from Armanitola Government High School in 1954 and intermediate examination from Dhaka College in 1956. He then earned his bachelor's in civil engineering from Ahsanullah Engineering College in 1960. He obtained his master's from Colorado State University in 1963 and Ph.D. from University of Strathclyde in 1970.

== Career ==
Shahjahan joined as a lecturer in Ahsanullah Engineering College (later BUET) in October 1960. He served as the vice-chancellor of BUET from April 1991 to November 1996. His second-term reappointment was truncated by a teacher-students-employees agitation. He retired from BUET in January 2000.

Shahjahan died on 20 September 2000 at Shaheed Suhrawardy Hospital in Dhaka.
