= Sayeed Salam =

Bangladeshi academic

Vice-Chancellor of State University of Bangladesh
- In office 23 September 2017 – c. 2019
- Preceded by: Iftekhar Ghani Chowdhury
- Succeeded by: M. Shahjahan Mina

Personal details
- Education: Ph.D.
- Alma mater: Bangladesh University of Engineering and Technology; National University of Malaysia

Md Sayeed Salam is a Bangladeshi academic. He was the vice-chancellor of State University of Bangladesh.

== Education ==
Salam completed his bachelor's degree in electrical and electronic engineering in 1984 from Bangladesh University of Engineering and Technology. He later earned his master's degree and Ph.D. in computer science from the National University of Malaysia in 1990 and 1995 respectively.
