= Md. Akhter Hossain Khan =

Bangladeshi soil scientist

- মোঃ আখতার হোসেন খান
- Occupations: Professor, Soil Scientist, Academic Administrator
- Employer(s): University of Dhaka, State University of Bangladesh
- Title: Vice-Chancellor of State University of Bangladesh

Academic background
- Education: University of Dhaka (B.Sc., M.Sc.), Kansas State University (Ph.D.)

Md. Akhter Hossain Khan is a Bangladeshi soil scientist and academic currently serving as the Vice-Chancellor of State University of Bangladesh since 2025. He is a Grade One Professor in the Department of Soil, Water and Environment at the University of Dhaka.

== Education ==
Khan completed his Bachelor of Science (1981) and Master of Science (1982) degrees in Soil Science from the University of Dhaka. He earned his Ph.D. in Agronomy from Kansas State University, USA, in 1996.

== Academic career ==
He began his academic career as a Research Assistant at the University of Dhaka in 1986 and has held various academic positions including Scientific Officer, Assistant Professor, Associate Professor, and since December 2004, Grade One Professor in the Department of Soil, Water and Environment. He also served as Provost of Amar Ekushey Hall from 2001 to 2007.

== Vice-Chancellorship ==
In 2025, Khan was appointed as the Vice-Chancellor of State University of Bangladesh, where he currently leads the university.

== Research interests ==
His research focuses on agronomy, soil physics, and soil water management.
