= Alee Murtuza =

Bangladeshi academic

Alee Murtaza
- আলী মুর্তুজা

9th Vice-Chancellor of Bangladesh University of Engineering and Technology
- In office 30 August 2002 – 29 August 2006
- Preceded by: Nooruddin Ahmed
- Succeeded by: A. M. M. Safiullah

Personal details
- Born: Ghatla, Noakhali District, Bengal Presidency, British India
- Education: Ph.D. (structural engineering)
- Alma mater: East Pakistan University of Engineering and Technology; University of Liverpool
- Occupation: University academic

Mohammad Alee Murtaza is a Bangladeshi academic. He served as the 9th Vice-chancellor of Bangladesh University of Engineering and Technology.

== Education ==
Murtaza passed matriculation examination from Laksam High School in 1959 and intermediate examination from Comilla Government College in 1959 and 1961 respectively. He earned his bachelor's in civil Engineering in 1965 from the East Pakistan University of Engineering and Technology. He obtained his master's from Bangladesh University of Engineering and Technology in 1976 and his Ph.D. from University of Liverpool in 1982 under Commonwealth Scholarship.

== Career ==
Murtaza worked as an assistant engineer in the East Pakistan Industrial Development Corporation from 1967 to 1973. In 1973, he joined as an assistant professor in the Department of Civil Engineering at Bangladesh University of Engineering and Technology and served as the vice-chancellor from 30 August 2002 until 29 August 2006.
