= Mirza Tanjim Shorif Mugdho =

Mirza Tanjim Shorif Mugdho মির্জা তানজিম শরীফ মুগ্ধ
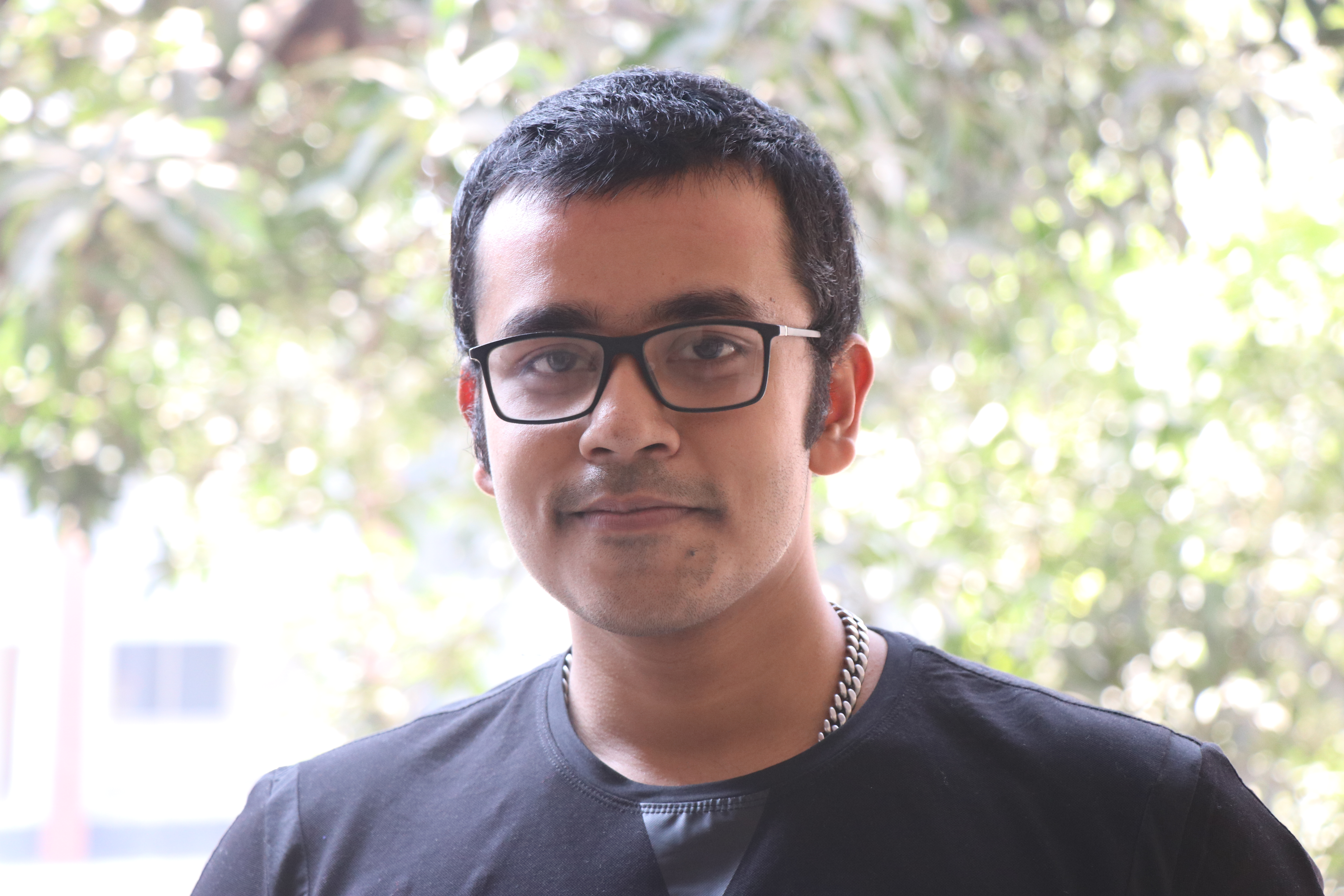
- Mugdho in 2018

Background information
- Born: Mugdho; 15 December; Mymensingh District
- Occupations: Playback singer; Academic; civil servants
- Years active: 2010–present
- Awards: Champion, Channel i Shera Kontho 2010

Mirza Tanjim Shorif Mugdho (born 15 December) is a Bangladeshi singer, educator, mathematician, civil servants and computer scientist. He became widely known after winning the 2010 season of Channel i Shera Kontho, one of Bangladesh's most popular television singing competitions. Besides his music career, he is also a bureaucrat. He has represented Bangladesh in international mathematics competitions and has received several national and international awards.

== Early birth and education ==
Mugdho was born in Mymensingh. He is the second of three brothers. His father Iskandar Mirza and mother Tahmina Begum. He completed his Secondary School Certificate (SSC) from Mymensingh Zilla School in 2010. He later completed his Higher Secondary Certificate (HSC) from Notre Dame College, Dhaka in 2012, receiving GPA 5 in both public examinations. He studied Computer science and engineering at Bangladesh University of Engineering and Technology (BUET) and earned his bachelor's degree between 2013 and 2017.

== Career ==
=== Music career ===
He loved music from an early age. His talent became nationally recognized when he won Channel i Shera Kontho 2010 singing competition. The victory helped him begin a professional career as a singer in Bangladesh's music industry. Since then, he has performed on television, stage shows and other musical events. Later he participated in Sa Re Ga Ma Pa 2018, where he reached the Top 48 contestants from hundreds of thousands of participants.

=== Academic career ===
Along with his music career, Mugdho has built a successful academic career. In 2019, he joined BRAC University as a lecturer in Department of Computer Science and Engineering. He also serves as a trainer for the Bangladesh National Math Team and has helped prepare students for national and international mathematics competitions. His research interests include computational mathematics, topology and cryptography.

== Mathematics achievements ==
He has represented Bangladesh in several prestigious mathematics competitions. His major achievements include:

- Honorable Mention at 53rd International Mathematical Olympiad (IMO) 2012.
- Bronze Medal at Asia-Pacific Mathematical Olympiad (APMO) 2012.
- Bronze Medals at Iranian Geometry Olympiad in 2017 and 2020.
- Champion of National Mathematical Olympiad of Bangladesh in 2010.

He has also worked as an observer, trainer and leader for Bangladesh's International Mathematical Olympiad team.

== Awards and recognition ==
- Champion, Channel i Shera Kontho 2010.
- Honorable Mention, International Mathematical Olympiad 2012.
- Top 48 contestant, Sa Re Ga Ma Pa 2018.
- Multiple national awards in singing, recitation, quiz, essay writing and public speaking.
