= Nihad Kabir =

Bangladeshi lawyer and businessperson

- নিহাদ কবির
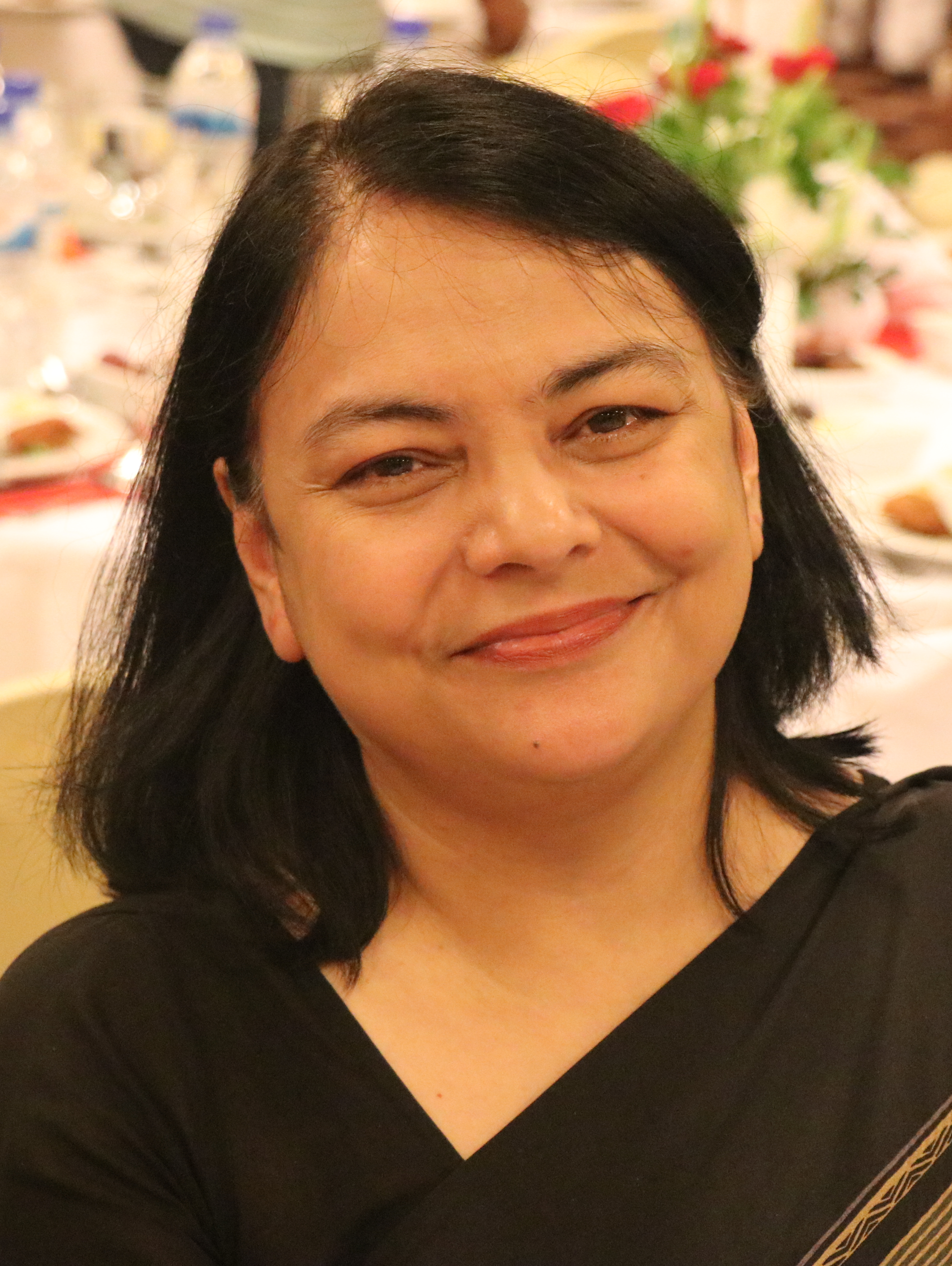
- Kabir in Dhaka (2018)
- Education: Cambridge University
- Occupations: Lawyer, business personality, educator

Nihad Kabir is a Bangladeshi business magnate, barrister and educator. She is well known for being one of the prominent women lawyers in Bangladesh. She is an advocate of the Supreme Court of Bangladesh who also served as the President of Metropolitan Chamber of Commerce and Industry, Dhaka from 2017 to 2022. In 2018, she was re-elected as the President of MCCI for 2019. In 2021, Kabir's name was revealed in the Pandora Papers leak as a beneficiary of some secret offshore entity.

== Career ==
Kabir obtained her BA degree in Law from the Cambridge University in 1988. She also joined the Bar of England and Wales in 1988. After returning to Bangladesh from England, she joined the Chambers of Syed Ishtiaq Ahmad and Associates and currently works as a senior partner.

Kabir was enrolled as an advocate in 1990 and was enrolled as the advocate of the High Court Division of Bangladesh in 1991. In the same year, she completed her LLM from the Cambridge University. She has been working as a Director at various institutes such as Kaderpur Tea, Brac Bank, Apex Footwear and Palli Karma-Sahayak. Most notably, she also worked as counsel in the office of the General Counsel of the Asian Development Bank headquarters in Manila from July 1996 to February 2000.

Kabir is a Director of Bangladesh Foreign Trade Institute.
