= Ahmad Mostofa Kamal =

Bangladeshi writer and engineer

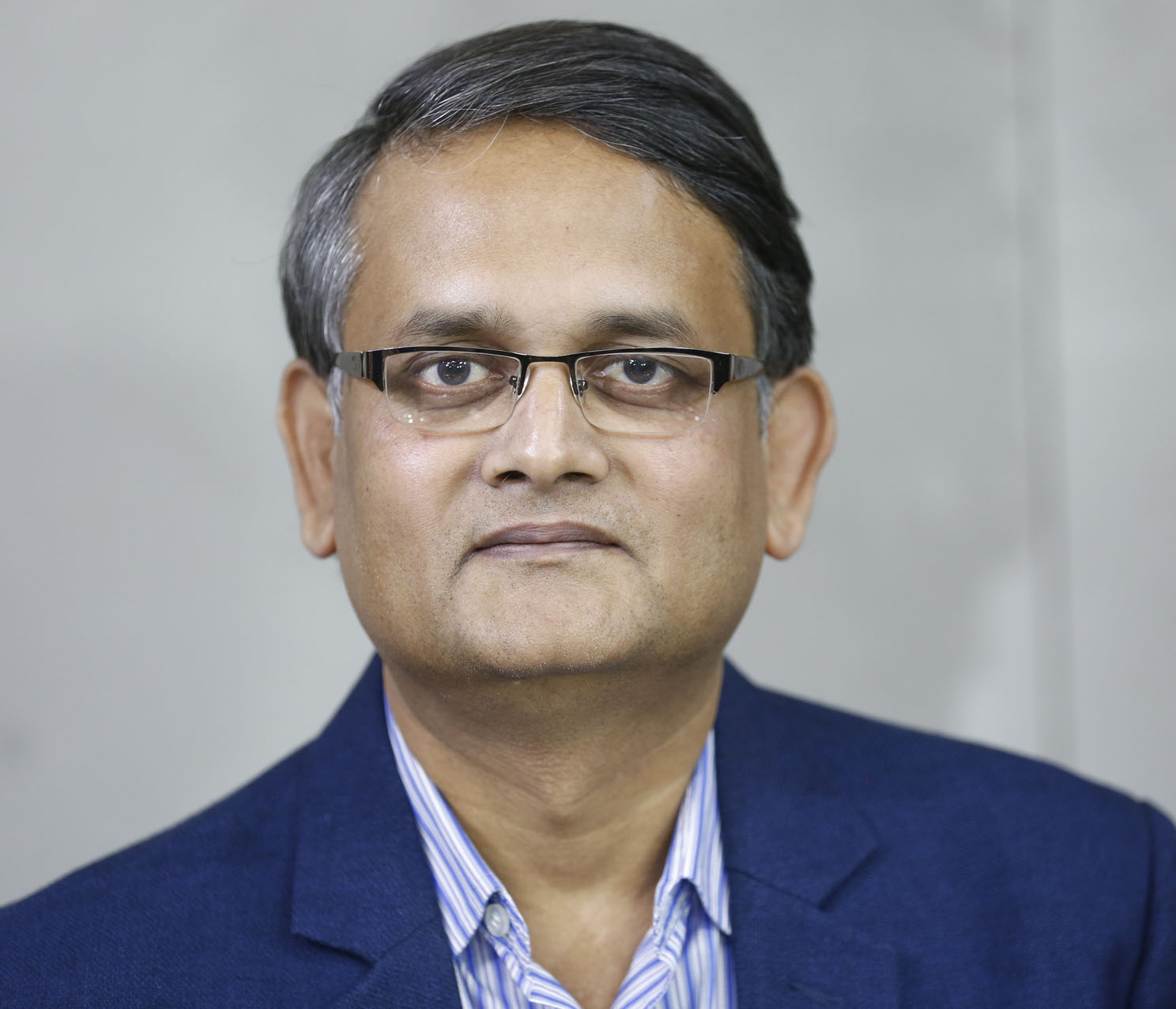
- Born: আহমাদ মোস্তফা কামাল; December 14, 1969 (age 56); Manikganj District, Bangladesh
- Citizenship: Bangladesh
- Education: University of Dhaka, Bangladesh University of Engineering and Technology (BUET)
- Occupation: Academic
- Known for: Literature and Education
- Spouse: Sharmin Akhter Jharna
- Children: Rasheeq Taheer
- Awards: Prothom Alo Book of the Year Award in 2007, Kali O Kolom Young Poets and Writers Award (2009), Gemcon Literary Award (2013), City-Anand Alo Literary Award (2018), Purbo-Paschim Literary Award (2021)

Ahmad Mostofa Kamal (born 14 December 1969) is a Bangladeshi writer and academic. He is currently a professor at Independent University, Bangladesh (IUB). He received Prothom Alo Book of the Year Award in 2007 (Bengali year 1413), Kali O Kolom Young Poets and Writers Award in 2009, Gemcon Literary Award in 2013, City-Anand Alo Literary Award in 2018, and Purbo-Paschim Literary Award in 2021 for his creative literary works.

== Early life & education ==
Kamal was born on 14 December 1969 in Manikganj District. His father was Muhammad Ahmadul Haque and mother was Meherunnesa Ahmed. He is the youngest of eight siblings, with five brothers and two sisters.

He completed his Secondary School Certificate (SSC) from Patgram Anatha Bandhu Government High School in Manikganj in 1986. He earned his Higher Secondary Certificate (HSC) from Notre Dame College, in 1988. He received a bachelor's degree in Physics from University of Dhaka in 1992 and a master's degree in 1993. Later, he obtained an MPhil in 2003 and a PhD in 2010 from Bangladesh University of Engineering and Technology (BUET). He is currently a professor at Independent University, Bangladesh (IUB).

== Literary career ==
He began writing in the early 1990s. His first short story collection, Ditiyo Manush (The Second Person), was published in 1998. Since then, he has published fourteen short story collections, ten novels (including one novella), five collections of literary essays, four collections of personal essays, one travelogue and one book of science essays. He has also edited several literary anthologies.

His first novel, Agantuk (The Stranger), introduced themes that would become central to his work, including human alienation, displacement and the role of memory. His fourth short story collection, Ghorvoroti Manush Othoba Noishobdyo (A House Full of People or Silence), won Prothom Alo Book of the Year Award in 2007. His second novel, Andho Jadukar (The Blind Magician), received Kali O Kolom Young Poets and Writers Award in 2009, while his third novel, Kannaporbo (Chapter of Tears), won Gemcon Literary Award in 2013.

His novel Niruddesh Jatra (Journey into the Unknown), published in 2018, explores themes such as the movement against military rule, Partition of India, displacement, communal violence, famine, autonomy movement and Bangladesh Liberation War.

== Published works ==
=== Short story collections ===
Title	First published	Publisher
Ditiyo Manush	February 1998	Dibyaprakash
Amra Ekti Golper Jonno Opekkha Korchi	February 2001	Sandesh
Andhokare Kichhui Dekha Jacche Na Bole	February 2004	Kagoj Prokashon
Ghorvoroti Manush Othoba Noishobdyo	February 2007	Sandesh
Bhor Othoba Shondhyara Namchhe Bedonay	February 2007	Oitijhya
Ashru O Roktopater Golpo	February 2010	Shuddhaswar
Ekla Thakar Golpo	February 2013	Nandanik
Prem-Apremer Golpo	February 2014	Sandesh
Kothao Ekhono Maya Rohiya Gel	February 2016	Godyopodyo
Dwidha, Bhoy O Udasinatar Golpo	February 2018	Sandesh
Nirbachito Golpo	December 2019	Batighar
Boroder Golpo Jemon Hoy	February 2020	Nagari
Golpo Sangraha (2 vols.)	February 2022	Pathak Samabesh
Rup Naraner Kule	January 2024	Kathaprakash

=== Novels ===
Title	First published	Publisher
Agantuk	February 2002	Sandesh
Andho Jadukar	February 2009	Sandesh
Kannaporbo	February 2012	Sandesh
Parampara	February 2012	Sandesh
Onno Kothao Onno Konokhane	February 2013	Sandesh
Barshamanjari	February 2013	Chandrabindu
Shobcheye Karun Shundor	February 2017	Bengal Publications
Prem Othoba Dohon-er Golpo (novella)	February 2017	Grantha Kutir
Niruddesh Jatra	February 2018	Prothoma
Joler Okkhore Lekha	February 2024	Pathak Samabesh
Upanyas Sangraha, Vol. 1	February 2025	Kathaprakash

=== Essays ===
Title	First published	Publisher
Sangshoyider Ishwar	February 2006	Adorn
Shilper Shakti, Shilpir Day	February 2010	Adorn
Rabindranath: Chotogalpe Chotora	February 2012	Murdhanya
Bangla Golper Uttaradhikar	February 2017	Rodela
Kotipoy Jotichihna	February 2022	Pathak Samabesh

=== Personal essays ===
Title	First published	Publisher
Ekdin Shob Kichhu Golpo Hoye Jay	February 2015	Sandesh
Jevabe Kobita Pori	February 2018	Grantha Kutir
Je Pothe Hente Eshechi	March 2021	Nagari
Jotshamanyo	January 2026	Kathaprakash

=== Interview book ===
Title	First published	Publisher
Tahader Songe Kathopokathon	February 2017	Rodela

=== Science essays ===
Title	First published	Publisher
Amader Mohajagatik Porichoy	May 2019	Prothoma

=== Travel writing ===
Title	First published	Publisher
Pakhir Chokhe Dekha	February 2020	Sandesh

== Edited books ==
- Bangalir Sangskritichinta, Volumes 1–4 (Bishwo Sahitya Kendra)
- Bangladesher Chotogalpo, Volumes 1–2 (Bishwo Sahitya Kendra)
- Bangasahityer Sera Golpo (Young readers' anthology; Bishwo Sahitya Kendra)
- Shreshtha Golpo: Syed Waliullah (Bishwo Sahitya Kendra)
- Shreshtha Golpo: Abu Ishak (Bishwo Sahitya Kendra)
- Shreshtha Golpo: Syed Shamsul Haq (Bishwo Sahitya Kendra)
- Shreshtha Golpo: Hasan Azizul Haque (Bishwo Sahitya Kendra)
- Shreshtha Golpo: Rahat Khan (Bishwo Sahitya Kendra)
- Shreshtha Golpo: Abdul Mannan Syed (Bishwo Sahitya Kendra)
- Roudra Chhayar Khela (Rabindranath Tagore stories for young readers; Shuddhaswar)
- Hironmoy Kathokota: Selected Interviews of Mahmudul Haque (Pendulum)

== Awards ==
Year	Award	Work	Result
2007	Prothom Alo Book of the Year Award	Ghorvoroti Manush Othoba Noishobdyo (A House Full of People or Silence)	Won
2009	Kali O Kolom Young Writers' Award	Andho Jadukar (The Blind Magician)	Won
2013	Gemcon Literary Award	Kannaporbo (Chapter of Tears)	Won
2018	City-Anand Alo Literary Award	Niruddesh Jatra	Won
2021	Purbo-Paschim Literary Award	—	Won
