= Nooruddin Ahmed =

Bangladeshi academic

8th Vice-Chancellor of Bangladesh University of Engineering and Technology
- In office 14 October 1998 – 30 August 2002
- Preceded by: Iqbal Mahmud
- Succeeded by: Alee Murtuza

Personal details
- Born: 6 January 1941 (age 85) Wari, Dhaka, Bengal Presidency, British India
- Education: Ph.D. (Chemical Engineering)
- Alma mater: Dhaka College; Ahsanullah Engineering College; University of Saskatchewan
- Occupation: University administrator

Nooruddin Ahmed (born 6 January 1941) is a Bangladeshi academic. He served as the 8th vice-chancellor of Bangladesh University of Engineering and Technology (BUET).

== Education ==
Ahmed passed matriculation examination from Armanitola Government High School and intermediate examination from Dhaka College in 1955 and 1957 respectively. He earned his bachelor's in chemical engineering in 1961 from the Ahsanullah Engineering College.

Ahmed obtained his master's and Ph.D. from the University of Saskatchewan in Canada in 1964 and 1968 respectively under Commonwealth Scholarship. He was a post-doctoral fellow at the NASA Interdisciplinary Materials Research Centre and Rensselaer Polytechnic Institute (RPI) in the United States from 1968 to 1969.

== Career ==
Ahmed joined East Pakistan University of Engineering and Technology (EPUET) as an assistant professor of chemical engineering in 1969. He was appointed a professor in 1976.

Ahmed served as the vice-chancellor of BUET from October 14, 1998, until August 30, 2002.

In December 2008, Ahmed was appointed chairman of Bangladesh Accreditation Board.
