= Iqbal Mahmud =

Bangladeshi educator

- ইকবাল মাহমুদ

State Minister for Agriculture and Forestry
- In office 1979–1981
- President: Ziaur Rahman

Chairman of Grameen Bank
- In office 13 September 1983 – 19 February 1989
- Preceded by: Position established
- Succeeded by: Mohammed Kaisar Hussain

7th Vice-Chancellor of Bangladesh University of Engineering and Technology
- In office 27 November 1996 – 14 October 1998
- Preceded by: Muhammad Shahjahan
- Succeeded by: Nooruddin Ahmed

Personal details
- Born: 8 March 1940 (age 86) Kolkata, British India
- Education: Ph.D. (Chemical Engineering)
- Alma mater: Bangladesh University of Engineering and Technology; University of Manchester
- Occupation: Academic
- Awards: Ekushey Padak

Iqbal Mahmud (born 8 March 1940) is a Bangladeshi educator and former state minister for agriculture and forestry. He served as the 7th vice-chancellor of Bangladesh University of Engineering and Technology (BUET). He was awarded Ekushey Padak in 2005 by the government of Bangladesh for his contribution to education.

== Early life and education ==
Mahmud was born in Kolkata, British India on 8 March 1940. He passed matriculation examination from Sylhet Government High School in 1954 and intermediate examination in from Murari Chand College in Sylhet in 1956. He earned his bachelor's in chemical engineering from Ahsanullah Engineering College (later Bangladesh University of Engineering and Technology) in 1960. He got his master's and Ph.D. degrees from University of Manchester in 1962 and 1964 respectively.

== Career ==
Mahmud joined as an assistant professor in Bangladesh University of Engineering and Technology in October 1964. He served as vice-chancellor from November 27, 1996, to October 14, 1998. He retired as a professor at the Department of Chemical Engineering in September 2000.

Mahmud served as the Minister of State for Agriculture and Forests for the government of Bangladesh during 1979 to 1981. He served as the first chairman of the Grameen Bank during 1980–1989. He was a member of Bangladesh University Grants commission during 1996–1997.

Mahmud is serving as a member of Academic Council of BRAC University.

He is the co-author, with Nooruddin Ahmed, of the textbook Corrosion Engineering: An Introductory Text, for undergraduate chemical engineers.
