= Quazi Sazzad Hossain =

2nd Vice-chancellor of Khulna University of Engineering & Technology
- In office 13 August 2018 – 2022
- Preceded by: Muhammed Alamgir
- Succeeded by: Mihir Ranjan Halder

Personal details
- Education: Universiti Sains Malaysia

Quazi Sazzad Hossain is a Bangladesh academic and a former vice-chancellor of Khulna University of Engineering & Technology.

== Early life ==
Hossain was born in 1968 to a Bengali family of Muslim Quazis in the Dahar-para of Lahuria village in Lohagara, Narail, then part of the Jessore District of East Pakistan. He was the eldest child of educationist Quazi Mufazzel Hossain and Begum Lutf-i-Jahan. Hossain graduated from Narail Victoria College, and Universiti Sains Malaysia.

== Career ==
Hossain was a professor of the civil engineering department of Khulna University of Engineering & Technology (KUET).

On 13 August 2018, Hossain was appointed the vice-chancellor of KUET. He received three new buses for the university in 2019.

Hossain closed KUET in the first week of December 2021 after students and teachers were agitated over the death of professor Mohammad Selim Hossain who died following harassment by Bangladesh Chhatra League activists.

In August 2022, Hossain signed an agreement with Huawei to establish an ICT academy at KUET.
