= State University of Bangladesh =

Private university in Dhaka, Bangladesh

- স্টেট ইউনিভার্সিটি অব বাংলাদেশ
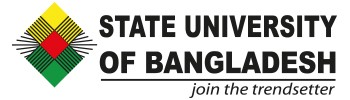
- Official Logo of the State University of Bangladesh
- Motto: Join the trendsetter
- Type: Private
- Established: 2002; 24 years ago
- Accreditation: IAB; PCB; Bar Council
- Affiliations: University Grants Commission (UGC)
- Chancellor: President Mirza Fakhrul Islam Alamgir
- Vice-Chancellor: Md. Akhter Hossain Khan
- Faculty: 200 (2021)
- Administrative staff: 102 (2021)
- Students: 2,500 (2021)
- Undergraduates: 1,781 (2021)
- Postgraduates: 648 (2021)
- Location: 696, Kendua, Kanchan, Rupganj, Narayanganj, Dhaka, 1461, Bangladesh; 23.8391°N 90.5506°E
- Campus: 3.65 acres (1.48 ha)
- Website: sub.ac.bd

State University of Bangladesh (Bengali: স্টেট ইউনিভার্সিটি অব বাংলাদেশ, also known as SUB) is a private university located in Dhaka, Bangladesh.

== History ==
SUB was founded in 2002 under the provisions of the Private University Act of 1992, amended in 1998. Initially, the university focused on pioneering academic programs in emerging areas of health sciences, which quickly established its reputation as an innovative institution. Over time, SUB has broadened its academic portfolio and currently offers programs through 10 departments organized within four schools. Furthermore, the university has submitted proposals to the University Grants Commission (UGC) of Bangladesh to introduce additional departments in Data Science and Music and Theatre Performance.

Recognized and accredited by the UGC, SUB provides a diverse range of undergraduate and postgraduate courses, reflecting its ongoing commitment to delivering quality higher education in Bangladesh.

== Academics ==
=== Schools and Departments ===
SUB is organized into four schools, each comprising several academic departments:

School of Business and Social Sciences

- Business Studies
- English Studies
- Journalism, Communication & Media Studies
- Law

School of Health Sciences

- Public Health

School of Pharmaceutical Sciences

- Pharmacy
- Microbiology

School of Science and Technology

- Architecture
- Computer Science & Engineering
- Environmental Science
- Food Engineering & Nutrition Science

=== Programs ===
==== Undergraduate ====
- Bachelor of Architecture (B.Arch)
- Bachelor of Business Administration (B.B.A.)
- Bachelor of Science in Computer Science & Engineering (B.Sc.)
- Bachelor of Science in Data Science and Engineering
- Bachelor of Arts (Hons) in English
- Bachelor of Science in Food Engineering and Nutrition Science
- Bachelor of Laws (LL.B. Hons)
- Bachelor of Pharmacy (B.Pharm.)
- Bachelor of Science in Microbiology
- Bachelor of Social Science (B.S.S. Hons) in Journalism, Communication and Media Studies (J.C.M.S.)

==== Graduate ====
- Master of Science in Data Science and Machine Learning
- Master of Laws (LL.M.)
- Master of Arts in Applied Linguistics & E.L.T.
- Master of Arts in English
- Master of Business Administration (Executive, Professional, Healthcare Management)
- Master of Public Health (M.P.H.)
- Master of Pharmacy (M.Pharm.)
- Master of Pharmacy in Clinical Pharmacy and Pharmacology
- Master of Science in Environmental Science
- Master of Science in Food Engineering and Nutrition Science

== Campus ==
The campus spans 3.65 acres in 696, Kendua, Kanchan, Rupganj, Narayanganj, Dhaka. It includes academic buildings, labs, studios, libraries, and recreational areas with amenities such as sports zone (indoor and outdoor), canteen, food court, stationery shop, shuttle service, and a large open area for cultural and social events. The campus is fully Wi-Fi enabled and secured by CCTV. Architecturally designed by Vistaara Architects (Pvt.) Ltd. under Arch Mustapha Khalid.

== Rankings ==
The following table summarizes the university's rankings from various sources as of 2024–2026:

Ranking Source	Scope	Rank	Total Universities	Year	Reference
UI GreenMetric World University Rankings 2026	Bangladesh	7	129	2026	https://uigreenmetric.com/university/sub.ac.bd
THE Sustainability Impact Ratings 2026	Bangladesh	9	129	2026	https://www.timeshighereducation.com/world-university-rankings/state-university-bangladesh
Times Higher Education (THE)	Global	1501+	—	2024	
EduRank	Global	7,164	14,131	2025	
EduRank	Bangladesh	55	129	2025	
AD Scientific Index (Citation Rank)	Global	8,163	18,683	2025	
AD Scientific Index (Citation Rank)	Bangladesh	68	161	2025	

== Administration ==
The university is governed by a Board of Trustees chaired by A. M. Shamim. The chancellor is the president of Bangladesh, President Mirza Fakhrul Islam Alamgir. The vice-chancellor, Md. Akhter Hossain Khan (designate), oversees academic and administrative affairs.

Other senior officials include:

- Nawzia Yasmin, Pro Vice-Chancellor
- Md. Hassan Kawsar, Treasurer
- Dr. Ahmed Hussain, Registrar

=== Board of Trustees ===
Name	Position
A. M. Shamim	President
Md. Mahbubur Rahman	Vice President
Ms. Saleha Ahamed	Member
Shuchorita Ahmed	Member
Ms. Mosteka Rahman	Member
Mr. Sakif Shamim	Member
Ms. Tasfia Farheen	Member
Mr. Mubashshir Mubarrat Rahman	Member

=== List of Vice-Chancellors ===
Name	Tenure	References
Iajuddin Ahmed	2002	
M. S. Ilyas Dhami	acting, 2003–2008	
Iftekhar Ghani Chowdhury	c. 2009–2016	
Sayeed Salam	September 2017–	
M. Shahjahan Mina	c. 2019–2020	
Vacant	as of September 2020	
Md. Anwarul Kabir	December 2020 – 2022	
Nawzia Yasmin	2023	
Md. Akhter Hossain Khan	2025–present	
