= Patwary =

Patwary was a title used in Bangladesh and India for village accountants, sometimes used hereditarily as a family name. It may refer to people who collects water toll.

== People ==
- Waliullah Patwari, acclaimed Bangladeshi academic
- Abdul Matin Patwari (born 1935), 4th vice-chancellor of Bangladesh University of Engineering and Technology
- Prabhudas Patwari (1909–1985), former Governor of Tamil Nadu
- Chandra Mohan Patowary (born 1955), Indian politician
- Ganpathi Naresh Patwari (born 1972), Indian chemist
- Jitendra 'Jitu' Patwari (born 1973), Indian cabinet minister
- Mohammad Javed Patwary (born 1961), former Inspector General of Bangladesh Police
- Nasiruddin Patwary, convener of the Jatiya Nagorik Committee and chief coordinator of the National Citizen Party, Bangladesh
- Shahed Ali Patwary (1899–1958), Bengali lawyer and legislator
- Shamim Haider Patwary (born 1981), Bangladeshi politician
- Shamim Hossain Patwari (born 2000), Bangladeshi national cricketer
- Siddiqur Rahman Patwari, Bangladeshi politician
- Patwary family of Char Kakra, Bhola Island
  - Dr. Azahar Uddin Ahmed Patwary (1913–2011), physician and deputy leader of the East Pakistan Provincial Assembly
  - Major (retd) Hafiz Uddin Ahmad Patwary (born 1944), footballer and Speaker of the Jatiya Sangsad

== See also ==
- Patwar, a revenue block in India
