= Mahbubur Rahman =

Mahbubur Rahman (Bengali: মহবুবুর রহমান) is a Bengali masculine given name of Arabic origin. It may refer to:

- Mahbubur Rahman (politician, born 1940) (1940–2021), Bangladeshi lawyer, politician and former education minister
- Mahbubur Rahman (lieutenant general), Bangladeshi lieutenant general and Chief of Army Staff
- Mahbubur Rahman (army officer, died 1981), Bangladeshi army officer
- Mahbubur Rahman (politician, born 1954) (1954–2024), Bangladeshi politician
- Mahbubur Rahman (umpire) (born 1957), Bangladeshi cricket umpire
- Mahbubur Rahman (police officer), Bangladeshi police officer
- Mahbubur Rahman (general, born 1962), Bangladeshi major general
- Mahbubur Rahman (engineer) (born 1963), Bangladeshi engineer
- Mahbubur Rahman (architect), Bangladeshi architect, academic, and researcher
- Mahbubur Rahman (cricketer) (born 1969), Bangladeshi cricketer
- Mahboob Rahman Ruhel (born 1970), Bangladeshi politician, businessman and film producer
- Mahbubur Rahman Sufil (born 1999), Bangladeshi footballer
- Mahbubur Rahman (Rangpur politician), Bangladeshi politician
