= Md. Ashraful Hoque =

Bangladeshi academic

Prof. Dr. Md. Ashraful Hoque
- মোঃ আশরাফুল হক

Vice-Chancellor of Ahsanullah University of Science and Technology
- Incumbent
- Assumed office 5 September 2024
- Preceded by: Mohammed Mahbubur Rahman

Personal details
- Education: Ph.D (Electrical and Electronic Engineering)
- Alma mater: Memorial University of Newfoundland

Md. Ashraful Hoque is an academic. He is the current vice chancellor of Ahsanullah University of Science and Technology (AUST) and pro vice-chancellor of Islamic University of Technology (IUT). He was previously a professor in the department of electrical and electronic engineering at Rajshahi University of Engineering and Technology (RUET).

== Early life and education ==
Hoque was born in Rangpur, Bangladesh. He pursued his undergraduate studies in Electrical and Electronic Engineering at the Bangladesh University of Engineering and Technology, graduating in 1986. He later completed his master's degree in 1993 and a PhD in 1996 from Memorial University of Newfoundland.

== Career ==
Hoque began his academic career as a lecturer at Rajshahi University of Engineering and Technology in 1986, where he served until 2006, rising to the rank of professor. In 2007, he joined the Islamic University of Technology as a professor in the Department of Electrical and Electronic Engineering. Over the years, he held key administrative roles at the Islamic University of Technology, including head of the department, dean of the Faculty of Engineering and Technology, and acting pro-vice chancellor.

On 5 September 2024, Hoque was appointed Vice-chancellor of Ahsanullah University of Science and Technology for a four-year term, effective from September 5.
