= Tawfique Hasan =

Professor of NanoEngineering

- Born: Bangladesh
- Education: Islamic University of Technology; University of New South Wales; University of Cambridge
- Scientific career
- Fields: 2D materials Nanowires; Porous materials Printed electronics Sensors
- Workplaces: University of Cambridge
- Thesis: Carbon nanomaterials for ultrafast photonics (2009)

Tawfique Hasan is a Bangladeshi scientist who is Professor of NanoEngineering at the University of Cambridge. He leads the nanoengineering group at the Cambridge graphene centre in the Department of Engineering, University of Cambridge.

== Early life and education ==
Hasan was born in Bangladesh. He attended the Islamic University of Technology, where he majored in electronic engineering. After completing his undergraduate degree, Hasan moved to Australia, where he joined the University of New South Wales as a Master's student in microelectronics. His Master of Engineering dissertation investigated CMOS processing. He moved to the University of Cambridge for his PhD, where he worked on carbon nanomaterials for ultrafast photonic devices. Hasan was particularly interested in polymer composites, which can be used as saturable absorbers for optical switches and optical amplifier noise suppressors.

== Research and career ==
Hasan joined King's College, Cambridge as a junior research fellow. He was awarded a Royal Academy of Engineering research fellowship to work on graphene-based processable electronic devices. He is particularly interested in computation-enabled smart devices. He was made a University Lecturer and Title A Fellow at Churchill College, Cambridge in 2013.

Whilst at the University of Cambridge, Hasan was a founder of Cambridge Graphene Limited. The company developed a scalable approach to producing graphene-based inks that are aqueous and non-toxic. He is particularly interested in roll-to-roll printing of graphene based electronic devices. He worked with Novalia, a technology company in Cambridge, to print water-based graphene inks at high speed (100 m/min). Hasan suspended tiny graphene particles of graphene in a solvent mixture that was incorporated into water-based inks. The graphene-based inks are quick to dry, stick to substrates well, and are waterproof. He demonstrated that it was also possible to print black phosphorus-based inks using the same approach.

The coffee ring effect, a phenomenon of fluid mechanics, can have a detrimental impact on printed electronic devices. The effect occurs because liquid evaporates rapidly at the edges of a droplet, causing particles within the droplets to accumulate and an uneven surface to form. Hasan studied the formation of these coffee rings using high-speed photography. He showed that by combining isopropyl alcohol and 2-butanol it was possible to better distribute the ink particles, creating thin films of uniform thickness.

In 2019, Hasan developed the world's smallest spectrometers (approx. 100 μm long), that he showed could be used to image onion cells. The spectrometers were made from semiconductor-based nanowires. The composition of the nanowire (semiconductor) is gradually changed from one end of the nanowire to another, which altered the optical properties (and band gaps) along the length of the nanowires.

=== Selected publications ===
- Bonaccorso, Francesco; Z. Sun; T. Hasan; A. C. Ferrari (2010). "Graphene photonics and optoelectronics". Nature Photonics. 4 (9): 611–622. arXiv:1006.4854. doi:10.1038/nphoton.2010.186. Wikidata Q29041443.
- Zhipei Sun; Tawfique Hasan; Felice Torrisi; et al. (2010). "Graphene Mode-Locked Ultrafast Laser". ACS Nano. 4 (2): 803–810. arXiv:0909.0457. doi:10.1021/nn901703e. PMID 20099874. Wikidata Q29304077.
- Torrisi, Felice; Tawfique Hasan; Weiping Wu; et al. (2012). "Inkjet-Printed Graphene Electronics" (PDF). ACS Nano. 6 (4): 2992–3006. doi:10.1021/nn2044609. PMID 22449258. Wikidata Q57424668.
