= History of Islamic University of Technology =

The 9th Islamic Conference of Foreign Ministers (ICFM) held in Dakar, Republic of Senegal on 24–28 April 1978. The establishment of IUT in Dhaka, Bangladesh was then approved by the then foreign ministers. All the members of the Organisation of the Islamic Conference (OIC) agreed to cooperate for the implementation of the project.

== Development ==
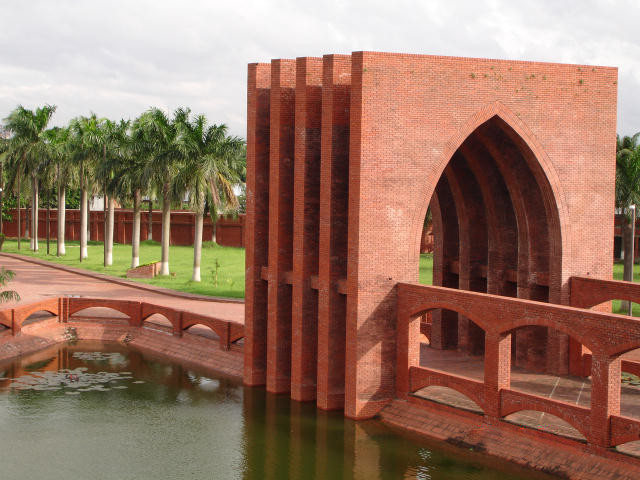
Five Fundamentals Gate

The implementation of the establishment commenced with the holding of the first meeting of the Board of Governors in June, 1979.

- Foundation stone of ICTVTR was laid by the late President Ziaur Rahman of the People's Republic of Bangladesh on March 27, 1981 in the presence of Yasir Arafat, the then chairman of the PLO, and Habib Chatty, the then Secretary General of OIC.
- ICTVTR was formally inaugurated by H.M. Ershad, the then president of People's Republic of Bangladesh on July 14, 1988.
- The 22nd ICFM held in Casablanca, Morocco on 10–11 December 1994 renamed the ICTVTR as Islamic Institute of Technology (IIT).

IIT was formally inaugurated by Begum Khaleda Zia the then Prime Minister of Bangladesh on 21 September 1995.

- The 28th ICFM held in Bamako, Republic of Mali on 25–29 June 2001 commended the efforts of IIT and decided to rename the IIT as Islamic University of Technology (IUT).

IUT was formally inaugurated by Begum Khaleda Zia Prime Minister of the People's Republic of Bangladesh on November 29, 2001.

== Advancement ==
The University has advanced much in a short time and still infrastructure is going on by availing the financing under loan from Islamic Development Bank (IDB) with guarantee provided by the Government of Bangladesh.

University started offering long regular courses from December 1986 and completed 24 academic years until 2010. The 24th Convocation was held at the IUT auditorium on 2 November 2010. Her Excellency Begum Sheikh Hasina, Prime Minister of the People's Republic of Bangladesh was the Chief Guest on the occasion.

== See also ==
- Islamic University of Technology
- IUT Alumni Association
