= Waliullah Patwari =

Waliullah Patwar was a Bangladeshi academic who received the Independence Award, the country's highest civilian award.

== Biography ==
Patwari was the headmaster of the Matlabganj J. B. High School in Chandpur District. His son-in-law, Dr Abdul Matin Patwari, was the 4th vice-chancellor of Bangladesh University of Engineering and Technology.

Patwari was awarded the Independence Award in 1981 for his contribution to education.
