= Khulna Khan Bahadur Ahsanullah University =

University In Bangladesh

- খুলনা খান বাহাদুর আহছানউল্লা বিশ্ববিদ্যালয়
- Type: Private
- Established: 2018
- Chancellor: President of Bangladesh
- Vice-Chancellor: Md. Mahmud Alam
- Students: 90
- Undergraduates: 90
- Location: 140, Khan Bahadur Ahsanullah Road, Boyra, Khulna, Bangladesh
- Campus: Urban
- Colors: Green and Orange
- Website: www.kkbau.ac.bd

Khulna Khan Bahadur Ahsanullah University (KKBAU) (Bengali: খান বাহাদুর আহছানউল্লা বিশ্ববিদ্যালয়) is a private university in Khulna. It founded by Dhaka Ahsania Mission.
