= Musharrof Husain Khan =

Bangladeshi college administrator (1933–2026)

- মুশারফ হোসেন খান

5th Vice-Chancellor of Bangladesh University of Engineering and Technology
- In office 25 April 1987 – 24 April 1991
- Preceded by: Abdul Matin Patwari
- Succeeded by: Muhammad Shahjahan

1st Vice-Chancellor of Ahsanullah University of Science and Technology
- In office 25 April 1995 – 31 January 2007

Personal details
- Born: 17 July 1933 Dhaka, Bengal Presidency, British India
- Died: 7 July 2026 (aged 92)
- Education: Dhaka College; Ahsanullah Engineering College; Texas A&M Engineering
- Occupation: Academic, college administrator

Musharrof Husain Khan (17 July 1933 – 7 July 2026) was a Bangladeshi academic. He served as the 5th vice-chancellor of Bangladesh University of Engineering and Technology. Also he served as first vice-chancellor of Ahsanullah University of Science and Technology.

== Life and career ==
Khan passed matriculation examination from State High School in Rajnandgaon in 1949 and intermediate examination from Dhaka College in 1951. He earned his bachelor's in mechanical engineering from Ahsanullah Engineering College in 1955. He received master's and Ph.D. from Texas A&M University in 1962 and 1964 respectively.

He joined as a lecturer at Ahsanullah Engineering College in December 1956. He served as the vice-chancellor of Bangladesh University of Engineering and Technology from April 1987 to April 1991. He also served as a vice-chancellor of Ahsanullah University of Science and Technology.

Khan died on 7 July 2026, at the age of 92.
