= Muhammad Fazli Ilahi =

Bangladeshi academic, engineer, and educationist

Vice-Chancellor of Ahsanullah University of Science and Technology
- In office 1 January 2020 – 31 December 2023
- Chancellor: Abdul Hamid
- Preceded by: A. M. M. Safiullah

Vice-Chancellor of Islamic University of Technology
- In office 4 January 2003 – 31 March 2008
- Chancellor: Secretary General of OIC
- Preceded by: M Anwar Hossain
- Succeeded by: M Imtiaz Hossain

Personal details
- Education: Bangladesh University of Engineering and Technology; University of Bradford
- Profession: Educationist, mechanical engineer, academic

Muhammad Fazli Ilahi is a Bangladeshi academic, engineer, and educationist who is the current vice-chancellor of Ahsanullah University of Science and Technology. Previously Ilahi served as the Vice-Chancellor of Islamic University of Technology from 4 January 2003 to 31 March 2008. He was also a professor of Mechanical Engineering at Bangladesh University of Engineering and Technology.

== Education ==
Ilahi passed his HSC from Notre Dame College, Dhaka after completing schooling at St Gregory's High School. He completed his BSc in mechanical engineering from Bangladesh University of Engineering and Technology (BUET) in 1971. Then he went to England and subsequently earned his PhD degree in 1977 from the University of Bradford.
