= Ahsanullah (educator) =

Khan Bahadur Ahsanullah
- খান বাহাদুর আহ্‌ছানউল্লাহ
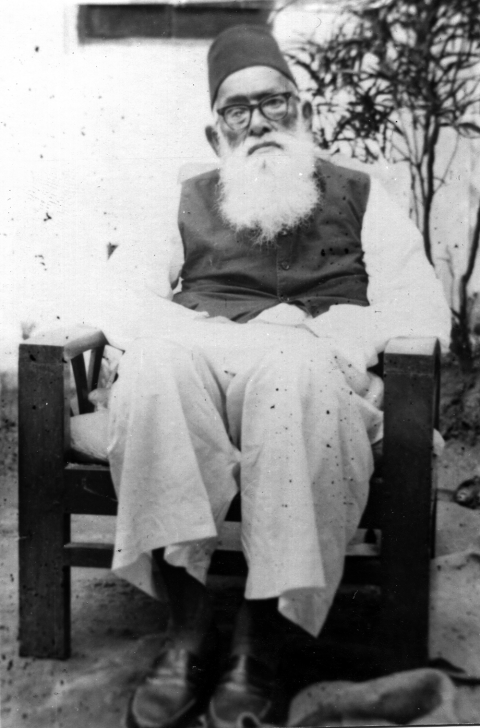
- Born: 27 December 1873; Satkhira, Bengal, British India
- Died: 9 February 1965 (aged 91); Satkhira, East Pakistan, Pakistan
- Other name: Sultanul Aaulia Kutubul Aktab Gause Jaman Aref Billah Hazrat Shah-Sufi Aalhaaj Khan Bahadur Ahsanullah Warsi
- Occupation: Educator
- Known for: Founder of Nalta Central Ahsania Mission, Dhaka Ahsania Mission and Co-Founder of University of Dhaka

Khan Bahadur Ahsanullah (27 December 1873 – 9 February 1965) was a Bangladeshi educator, litterateur, Islamic theologist and social reformer of pre-partition India.

He was instrumental in the formation of the University of Dhaka and is the namesake of Ahsanullah University of Science and Technology.

== Career ==
Ahsanullah completed his MA in philosophy from Presidency College, Kolkata in 1895, and went on to serve as first Muslim headmaster of Rajshahi Collegiate School. In 1911 he was awarded fellowship in The Royal Society for the Encouragement of Arts, Manufactures and Commerce (RSA) which has worldwide member of 30,000 (as of 2020).

In the same year British Indian Government also awarded him the title "Khan Bahadur". He became the first person amongst the Hindus and Muslims of Undivided Bengal to join the Indian Education Service. He served as a senator of the University of Calcutta, and was especially active in the movement to establish the University of Dhaka.

== Ahsania Mission ==
Ahsanullah founded "Nalta Central Ahsania Mission (NCAM)" on 15 March 1935 at Nalta Sharif. NCAM is the Central Ahsania Mission in the world. "Divine & Humanitarian Service" is the motto of Dhaka Ahsania Mission.

Then, in 1958, Ahsanullah founded the Dhaka Ahsania Mission (DAM), a non-profitable organization with broad social goals.

DAM founded the Ahsanullah University of Science and Technology (AUST), Khan Bahadur Ahsanullah University, Khan Bahadur Ahsanullah Teachers Training College (KATTC), Ahsania Mission College (AMC), Ahsanullah Institute of Information & Communication Technology (AIICT), Ahsania Mission Institute of Medical Technology (AMIMT), Ahsania Institute of Technology and Business (AITB), Ahsania e-Solutions (AeS), Ahsania Mission Book Distribution House (AMBDH), Ahsania Mission Cancer & General Hospital (AMCGH), and NCAM also founded Nalta Sharif Ahsania Mission Orphanage (NSAMO) at Dhaka, naming it in honor of their founder.

== Works ==
Ahsanullah wrote around 100 books on different contents. Some of his notable books are:

- Bangabhasa O Musalman Sahitya (1918)
- Teachers' Manual (1918)
- Dīniyat (1938)
- Islam O Adarsha Mahapurus (1926)
- Hejaz Bhraman (1929)
- Hazrat Mohammad (Sm) (1931)
- Shiksaksetre Bangiya Musalman (1931)
- History of the Muslim World (1931)
- Tariqat Shiksa (1940)
- Amar Jibandhara (1946)
- Sufi (1947)
- Bangla Sahitya (1948)
