= Matlabganj J. B. High School =

School in Bangladesh

Coordinates: 23.3485°N 90.7061°E

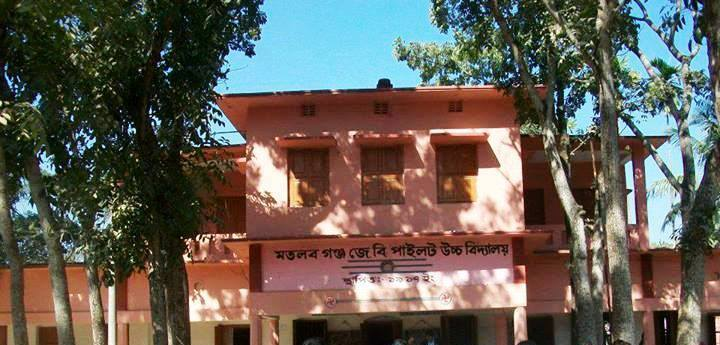
The Institute

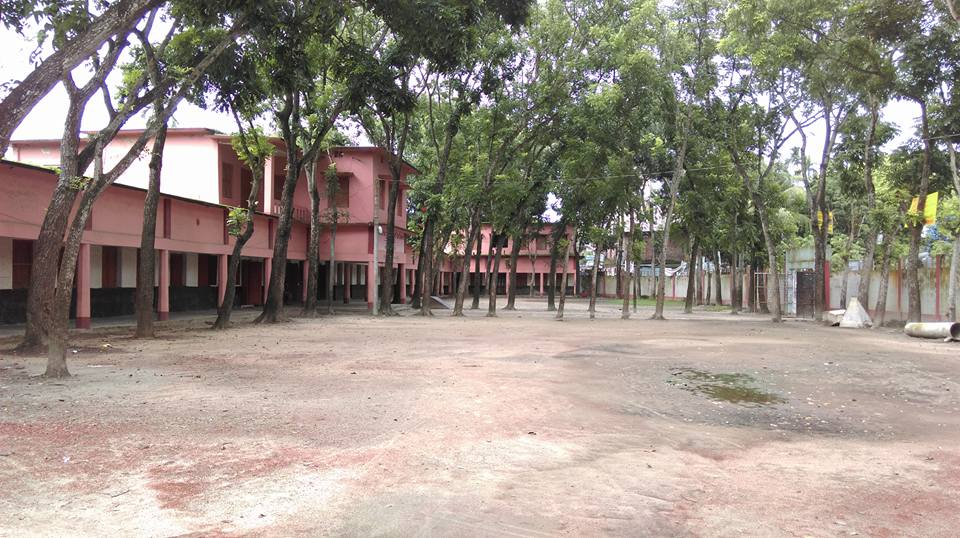
Campus

Matlab J. B. Govt. High School also known as Matlabganj J.B. Pilot High School. It is an educational institution of Chandpur (erstwhile Greater Comilla), Bangladesh.

== History ==
Residents and humanitarians, the late Jagabandhu Saha and the late Biswanath Ghosh, from the Saha Para (community) on the south-east corner of the old campus and the Ghosh Para (community) on the south-west corner respectively, founded the institute in 1917 and therefore the letters J and B in the name of the institute.

Its initial days included the Partition of British India into West Pakistan, East Pakistan and India; an event that succeeded in spreading disharmony in the subcontinent. Bengal was Partitioned and a population transfer, at the expense of significant human suffering, took place. It also withstood the trying times of Bangladesh Liberation War— the formation of Bangladesh replacing the erstwhile East Pakistan.

The nineteen fifties and the sixties became an 'Era of Remarkable Excellence'. The achievements of the high school at that time is a story of hope, in view of what Matlab was then — a rural area inhabited mostly by peasants, fishermen, and small business owners, all tormented by wild monkeys and snakes, and plagued by cholera and typhoid. Talent pool for the school was shallow and finance pool was almost dry.

Dr A Matin Patwari, an MJBHS alumnus secured first position in East Pakistan Board Examinations in 1950.

The school was initially nurtured by MJBHS's Headmaster, the late Waliullah Patwari.

== Recognition ==
Tapantosh Chakrabarty- MJBHS alumnus (1965), BUET Chemical Engineer, PhD from University of Waterloo, a seven-continent marathon finisher, Innovator and a Columnist from Calgary, Canada wrote about his days at MJBHS for the Daily Observer.

As I was finishing the St. George Marathon (STGM) on 1 October 2016... Matlab School and five of its luminaries... the faces of the five... four from a peaceful place up somewhere in the galaxy and one from Gulshan, Dhaka, surfaced... The memories from MJBHS also occupied my thoughts. I thought of the day at Matlab, when feeling frustrated not being able to study, I ran from the house southward through Ghosh Para and by the new hostel and to the main hostel. That was when I first tasted the benefit of running in busting stress-related discomforts and of boosting brain power. I pondered about the parallel between the struggle of building St. George on an arid land and that of building MJBHS in a village, stricken with poverty and paucity of resources. Feeling energized by the analogy and the dedication of the STGM to MJBHS and five of its luminaries, I summoned all the residual energy and ignored all the muscular pains in finishing the formidable STGM, about forty minutes faster than my most recent Vancouver Marathon on 1 May 2016.

Walking back to the car in a St. George parking lot, I studied the STGM medal around my neck. Made of light pink stone, the first line on it read: '40 YEARS RUNNING'. I thought of the two founders, J and B, of MJBHS, one from Saha Para and the other from Ghosh Para of Matlab. Their school educated so many, regardless of their politics and religions, over the past 100 years. J and B did not get any medal of honour for that. They did not have to. The school's physical presence, its name bearing their names, and its thousands of alumni are their gold medal. That medal proudly reads: '100 YEARS RUNNING'.

J and B deserve another recognition for the concomitant impact MJBHS has had on the peaceful co-existence in the community. Violence or communal riot instigated by rogue politicians or religious zealots did not occur in Matlab since I can remember. Visiting Matlab in 2015 amid politically-instigated petrol bomb attacks on the innocents in the country, I asked a rickshaw puller about the situation there. 'Those things do not happen here, sir,' said he proudly. MJBHS, its headmasters ---especially, its 1947 partition-time headmaster, the great Waliullah Patwari ---teachers, students, alumni, and support staff had played a big part in that, I opined. 'How could there be any communal tension between Hindus and Muslims, when the most impactful philanthropic act in the history of Matlab was by J and B, two Hindus, for the benefits of all, but mostly of Muslims, for many generations?' I continued. And in recognition of the humanitarian impact of MJBHS on the community, a posthumous peace medal for J and B reads: '100 YEARS PROMOTING PEACE.'

Matlab Model of Success, built on nine pillars, produced outstanding results in a resource-restricted village in the nineteen-fifties and the sixties. It should work even better in modern-day Matlab and elsewhere. All teachers and educators in all educational institutions, at any level and anywhere, may study and learn from the exciting educational experiment that MJBHS was in that era of excellence.

— Dr Tapantosh Chakrabarty, Alumnus, October, 2016 The Daily Observer

== Notable alumni ==
- Abdul Matin Patwari, Vice-chancellor of Bangladesh University of Engineering and Technology, matriculated in 1950.
- AB Siddique, a drafter of the Constitution of Bangladesh and member of parliament, matriculated in 1943.
