= Julie Sokolow =

American singer-songwriter

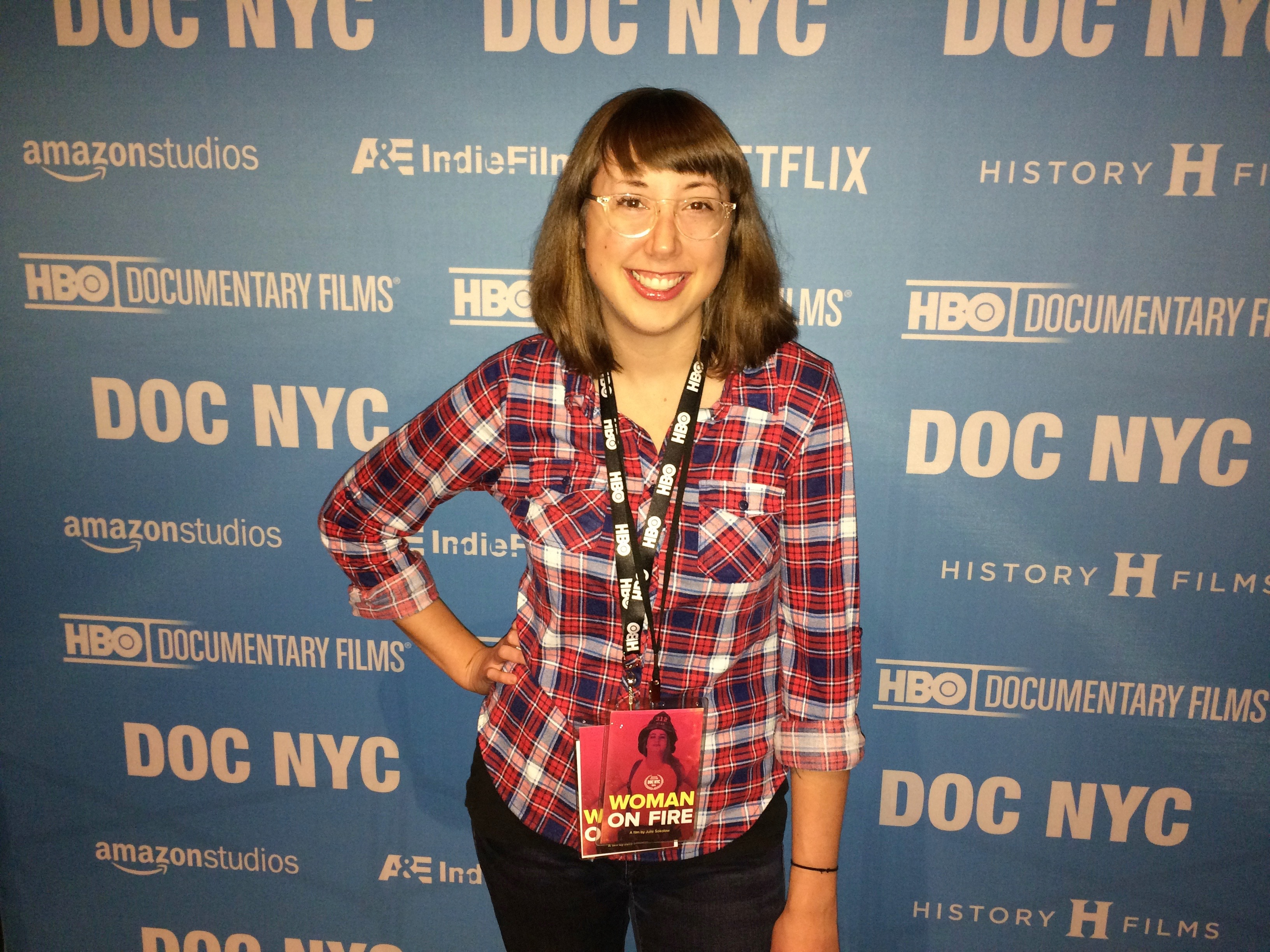
- Julie Sokolow at DOC NYC
- Born: April 3, 1987 (age 39)
- Occupations: Film director, musician, writer
- Years active: 2006-present
- Website: http://www.juliesokolow.com

Julie Sokolow (born April 3, 1987) is an American film director, musician, and writer. Her body of work includes documentary films, personal essays, and musical compositions. She directed the films Barefoot: The Mark Baumer Story (2019), Woman on Fire (2016), Aspie Seeks Love (2015), and the Healthy Artists series (2012-4). She first came to public attention with her music album Something About Violins (2006).

== Biography ==
Julie Sokolow was raised in New Jersey. While in high school, she took philosophy courses at NYU and would often see independent films at the IFC Center and the Angelika Film Center. After graduating, she attended the University of Pittsburgh on a full scholarship where she studied film, writing, and psychology while composing music.

At 19, she released an indie music album Something About Violins through Western Vinyl that gained acclaim from Pitchfork, Wire, and the Washington Post. Often drawing comparisons to Cat Power and Mirah, Sokolow has been noted for her decidedly lo-fi sound, minimalistic style, and intimate lyrics.

Sokolow became immersed in filmmaking while taking classes at Pittsburgh Filmmakers. In 2012, she created the documentary series Healthy Artists, profiling over 40 artists who are uninsured and underinsured. In 2014, Sokolow and the series were profiled by The New York Times.

In 2015 her first feature film, Aspie Seeks Love, premiered at the Cinequest Film Festival and won Best Documentary. Aspie Seeks Love chronicles David V. Matthews, an offbeat writer on a quest to find love after a late-in-life Aspergers diagnosis. The film played festivals worldwide and received acclaim from Vice, Salon, and Huffington Post who likened the film to Crumb and American Movie.

Sokolow's second documentary feature Woman on Fire premiered at DOC NYC in 2016. Woman on Fire follows Brooke Guinan, the first openly transgender firefighter in NY and a third-generation firefighter. The film has been described as a heartwarming and moving portrait by sources such as IndieWire and the Village Voice. The film aired on Starz in November 2017.

In 2019 her third documentary feature, Barefoot: The Mark Baumer Story, premiered at the Heartland International Film Festival and won Best Premiere Documentary. The film profiles writer and activist Mark Baumer, who walked over 100 days barefoot to protest climate change. Barefoot received acclaim from The Playlist and The Hollywood Reporter who called the film “an affectionate and inspiring portrait”.

Sokolow often contributes personal essays to Salon, Huffington Post, and HTMLGIANT. Sokolow's writing and filmmaking blend the personal and political. Her cinematic documentaries are often noted for their intimate, character-driven quality as well as their humor.
