= Becoming Who We Are: Real Stories About Growing Up Trans =

2024 graphic novel anthology

- Date: June 4, 2024
- Page count: 144 pages
- Publisher: A Wave Blue World

Creative team
- Writers: Sammy Lisel, Lilah Sturges
- Artists: Hazel Newlevant, Cynthia Yuan Cheng, Naomi Rubin, Ravi Teixeira, Victor Martins, Kameron White, Sage Coffey, Sunmi, higu rose
- Editors: Sammy Lisel, Hazel Newlevant
- ISBN: 978-1949518269

Becoming Who We Are: Real Stories About Growing Up Trans is a 2024 graphic novel anthology about the coming of age of transgender people. It covers the childhoods of nine real-life transgender people, each illustrated by different artist and written by Sammy Lisel, with Lilah Sturges co-writing one story. The novel won the 2025 GLAAD Media Award for Outstanding Graphic Novel/Anthology.

== Contents ==
With the exception of one story, which was co-written by Lilah Sturges, all stories were written solely by Sammy Lisel. The book was co-edited by Lisel and Hazel Newlevant.

The book's subjects include Sam Long, Robbi Mecus, Brooke Guinan, Diamond Stylz, Kate Stone, Marli Washington, Robbie Ahmed, Robin Aguilar, and Rebekah Bruesehoff.

== Development ==
The book was originally funded through Kickstarter in 2023.

== Reception ==
The novel was positively reviewed by Kirkus Reviews, which called its stories "inspiring and honest accounts from relatable role models". It also received reception from Broken Frontier and Foreword Reviews. Letitia Montgomery-Rodgers of Foreward Reviews noted the diverse "cultural, economic, and racial" backgrounds of the people depicted.

Becoming Who We Are won the 2025 GLAAD Media Award for Outstanding Graphic Novel/Anthology at the 36th GLAAD Media Awards.
