= Robbi Mecus =

American forest ranger and mountain climber (1971–2024)

- Born: 1971; Queens, New York City, New York, U.S.
- Died: April 25, 2024 (aged 52); Denali National Park and Preserve, Alaska
- Children: 1

Robbi Ann Mecus (1971 to April 25, 2024) was an American forest ranger and mountaineer. Mecus was a trans woman, and was considered a role model and pioneering figure for other LGBTQ climbers and forest rangers.

== Life ==
Mecus was born in Queens, New York City, and raised in Greenpoint, Brooklyn in a Catholic blue collar family. Her father was a former marine who worked for a telephone company, while her mother was a homemaker. As an adult, she characterized her upbringing as conservative, and her father as "very homophobic". She understood herself to be a girl from a young age, but did not express herself as such. She was introduced to the word 'transsexual' in middle school. Her first exposure to LGBTQ people was in her Long Island high school in the late 1980s, where one student was rumored to be gay. As a young adult, Mecus moved back to New York City.

Mecus became involved with climbing as a young adult, and fell in love with the sport. In the 1990s, Mecus moved to Newburgh, Orange County, and climbed in New Paltz.

Mecus became a forest ranger in New York in 1999. She worked for the New York Department of Environmental Conservation for more than 25 years. She was part of rescue efforts in New York City following the 9/11 attacks in 2001. As a ranger, she aided in locating and saving hikers in need. As an already experienced climber, Mecus was a "key link" between rangers and the climbers who would aid in rescues. During the winter, she enforced snowshow regulations on Cascade Mountain. She also used social media to share information with hikers and monitor their progress. She assisted in hundreds of rescue missions as a ranger and saved multiple lives as a ranger; one such rescue was written about in the New York Times two weeks before her death. Mecus was known as a strong mountain climber, and would accompany other climbers of all ability levels.

Mecus described her field as "hyper macho"; in 2019, only 12% of the 150 state forest rangers were women, and none were people of color or openly gay.

In 2021, Mecus traveled to California to assist forces fighting the Dixie Fire. In 2022, Mecus and Melissa Orzechowski established the Adirondack Queer Ice Fest.

Mecus died on April 25, 2024, after falling about 1,000 feet while climbing Mount Johnson in Denali National Park and Preserve in Alaska. She was 52. Her climbing partner, Melissa Orzechowski, was seriously injured, but survived. On April 30, the town of Keene, New York passed a resolution in honor of Mecus's life. A Celebration of Life event for Mecus was held in Keene on June 22, 2024. In April 2025, the NYDEC held a flag raising ceremony at the organization's headquarters in Ray Brook in honor of Mecus on Trans Day of Visibility.

== Personal life ==
Mecus was married and had one daughter. After identifying privately as a crossdresser for many years, she came out to her wife in December 2015 as a trans woman. She came out publicly in 2016, at age 44, and found support with her coworkers. Mecus and her wife later divorced, but continued to have an amicable relationship.

Mecus attended the Women's March in Boston in January 2017. As of 2019, she lived in Keene, New York.

Mecus was one of nine transgender people depicted in the 2024 graphic novel anthology Becoming Who We Are: Real Stories About Growing Up Trans.
