= Mark Baumer =

American writer, adventurer, and environmental activist

- Born: December 19, 1983; Hammond, Indiana, U.S.
- Died: January 21, 2017 (aged 33); Walton County, Florida, U.S.
- Education: Wheaton College (BA); Brown University (MFA)
- Occupations: Writer, environmentalist
- Known for: Attempting to walk barefoot across America

Mark Baumer (December 19, 1983 – January 21, 2017) was an American writer, adventurer, and environmental activist.

In 2010, Baumer walked across the United States in 81 days. In 2016, he attempted to walk barefoot across America, in order to raise awareness about climate change. Baumer was struck and killed by an S.U.V. on the walk, while in Florida.

== Life and work ==
Baumer was born in Hammond, Indiana, the only child of Jim and Mary Baumer. The family relocated to Durham, Maine, where Baumer attended Greely High School and was the hockey team's captain.

At Wheaton College in Massachusetts, Baumer was on the baseball team and competed in the Division III College World Series. He also began to write fiction and poetry and to create experimental videos.

From 2009 to 2011, he attended the Brown University M.F.A. program in Literary Arts. He gained fame on campus for instructing a writing class on the "art of subtle weirdness".

From 2012 to 2017, Baumer was an employee of the Brown University Library. During this time, he self-published several books. In 2012, he wrote 50 books in one year and self-published them all through Amazon.com. In 2015, he won the Quarterly West novella contest for his book Holiday Meat.

In 2016, Baumer joined The FANG Collective, an activist collective based in Rhode Island. That April, Baumer chained himself to Textron's world headquarters to protest the manufacture of cluster bombs. He was subsequently arrested. Four months after the direct action, Textron ended their production of cluster bombs. In September, Baumer organized and led a three-day march from Providence, to Burrillville, Rhode Island to protest a fossil fuel power plant that was proposed for the town. In 2019 the power plant project was cancelled.

== 2010 walk ==
During the summer of 2010, Baumer walked across the United States in 81 days. The trip started in Tybee Island, Georgia and ended in Santa Monica, California. He chronicled the trip in his self-published book I am a Road. Baumer went through several pairs of shoes on the trip, and wrote about the excruciating pain he experienced.

== 2016–2017 walk ==
Inspired by Christopher McDougall's book Born to Run about the health benefits of barefoot running, Baumer started to adapt a barefoot lifestyle. After months of training, he vowed to walk barefoot across the United States. He left for his journey on October 13, 2016, from his home in Providence, Rhode Island.

On the walk, Baumer strove to raise $10,000 for FANG, an activist collective based in Rhode Island. He also sought to protest climate change.

Each day of the walk, Baumer posted a video to YouTube documenting his trip. He also posted poems, diary entries, and photographs on various social media sites, leading The New Yorker to call him "a compulsive social-media diarist".

== Death ==
On January 21, 2017, Baumer was struck and killed by an S.U.V. while walking barefoot in Walton County, Florida. The crash occurred at about 1:15 pm. "He was wearing a high-visibility vest at the time, and walking against the traffic, in accordance with safety conventions," according to The New Yorker. Baumer died on day 101 of his barefoot walk.

== Personal life ==
Baumer was a vegan, and did not use alcohol or drugs. He did not own a car and would walk, run, and bike as his primary means of transportation. In Providence, Rhode Island, he owned a house that he shared with roommates. He identified as a minimalist and slept on a portable Shiatsu pad. Baumer was also an avid yogi and meditator.

In 2016, he started dating the poet and Brown University professor Ada Smailbegovic. They were together until his death in 2017.

== Media attention ==
From 2016 to 2017, Baumer was interviewed by Vice and several local newspapers during his barefoot walk.

In 2017, the news of Baumer's death went viral and appeared in The New York Times, CNN, The Los Angeles Times, and numerous publications worldwide.

Barefoot: The Mark Baumer Story (2019), directed by Julie Sokolow, is a documentary about Baumer's barefoot walk. The film features Baumer's own footage, as well as interviews with his family and friends. The Hollywood Reporter called the film "an affectionate and inspiring portrait".

== Legacy ==
After Baumer's death, his family created The Mark Baumer Sustainability Fund. The non-profit supports environmental and social justice projects in Maine, Rhode Island, and around the country.

Brown University established The Mark Baumer Prize for Language Art. Every year, a prize is awarded to a graduate and undergraduate student.

== Works ==
- The One on Earth: Selected Works of Mark Baumer (eds. Blake Butler & Shane Jones, foreword by Claire Donato) (2021)
- Meow (2019)
- I am a Road (2016)
- Roommate Missed Connections with W. Keller (2016)
- You Are Very Beautiful When You Watch Me Sleep (2016)
- Holiday Meat (2016)
- Fifty Books (2012)

== See also ==
- List of barefooters
