= Dhaka Ahsania Mission =

Bangladeshi non-governmental organisation

- Formation: 1958; 68 years ago
- Headquarters: Dhaka, Bangladesh
- Region served: Bangladesh
- Official language: Bengali
- Website: www.ahsaniamission.org.bd

Dhaka Ahsania Mission is a non-governmental organisation located in Dhaka, Bangladesh.

== History ==
The mission was founded in 1958 by Khan Bahadur Ahsanullah. It is one of the largest NGOs in Bangladesh and has helped 1.9 million women achieve economic solvency. The mission founded Ahsania Mission Cancer Detection and Treatment Centre. It founded three universities, Ahsanullah University of Science and Technology, Khulna Khan Bahadur Ahsanullah University & Ahsania Mission University of Science and Technology, a Medical College: Ahsania Mission Medical College, the country's first private teachers college: Khan Bahadur Ahsanullah Teachers' Training College. The mission also founded Ahsanullah Institute Technical and Vocational Education and Training Institute, Ahsanullah Institute of Information & Communication Technology, Ahsanullah Mission College, and Vocational Training Institute for Working Children. It operates a number of social welfare company including Hajj Finance Company, Boibazar, Nogordola, and Ahsania-Malaysia Hajj Mission. It won the Independence Day Award in 2002, the highest civilian honor in Bangladesh. In 2014 mission opened Ahsania Mission Cancer and General Hospital, the largest cancer hospital in Bangladesh.
