= A. M. M. Safiullah =

Bangladeshi academic (1947–2021)

- এ এম এম সফিউল্লাহ

10th Vice-Chancellor of Bangladesh University of Engineering and Technology
- In office 2006–2010
- Preceded by: Alee Murtuza
- Succeeded by: S M Nazrul Islam

Vice-Chancellor of Ahsanullah University of Science and Technology
- In office 1 August 2011 – 31 August 2019
- Preceded by: M. Anwar Hossain
- Succeeded by: Muhammad Fazli Ilahi

Personal details
- Born: 17 August 1947; Mymensingh, East Bengal, Dominion of Pakistan
- Died: 24 April 2021 (aged 73); Dhaka, Bangladesh
- Education: PhD (civil engineering)
- Alma mater: Bangladesh University of Engineering and Technology; University of Strathclyde
- Occupation: Academic

A. M. M. Safiullah (17 August 1947 – 24 April 2021) was a Bangladeshi academic. He served as the 3rd vice-chancellor of Ahsanullah University of Science and Technology and the 10th vice-chancellor of Bangladesh University of Engineering and Technology (BUET).

== Education ==
Safiullah studied in East Pakistan Cadet College (later renamed to Faujderhat Cadet College). He earned his bachelor's and master's in civil engineering from Bangladesh University of Engineering and Technology (BUET) in 1969 and 1977 respectively. He obtained his PhD degree from the University of Strathclyde in 1981 with a Commonwealth Scholarship.

== Career ==
Safiullah joined BUET as a lecturer in civil engineering in 1973 and eventually became a professor in 1984. He held the position of the 10th vice-chancellor of BUET from August 2006 until August 2010. He was among the panel of experts appointed by the Government of Bangladesh for construction of Bangabandhu Bridge, and the panel of experts for construction of the Padma bridge (the largest structure to be built in Bangladesh).

== Personal life and death ==
Safiullah died on 24 April 2021 from COVID-19 complications.
