= Ahsanullah University of Science and Technology =

University in Dhaka, Bangladesh

- আহ্ছানউল্লা বিজ্ঞান ও প্রযুক্তি বিশ্ববিদ্যালয়
- Logo of Ahsanullah University of Science and Technology
- Other name: AUST
- Type: Private, research
- Established: 1995; 31 years ago
- Accreditation: Institution of Engineers, Bangladesh; Institute of Architects Bangladesh; Institution of Textile Engineers and Technologists; Washington Accord
- Affiliations: University Grants Commission (UGC)
- Chancellor: President Mirza Fakhrul Islam Alamgir
- Vice-Chancellor: Professor Dr. Md. Ashraful Hoque
- Faculty: 350 (2014)
- Administrative staff: 134 (2014)
- Students: 6,843 (2014)
- Undergraduates: 6,248 (2014)
- Postgraduates: 575 (2014)
- Location: 141 & 142, Love Road, Tejgaon, Dhaka, 1208, Bangladesh; 23°45′49″N 90°24′25″E
- Campus: Urban, 1.5 acres (0.61 ha)
- Language: English
- Website: www.aust.edu

University rankings

Regional – Overall
- QS Asia: 518 (2026)

Ahsanullah University of Science and Technology (Bengali: আহ্ছানউল্লা বিজ্ঞান ও প্রযুক্তি বিশ্ববিদ্যালয়), commonly known as AUST, is a private science and technology university in Bangladesh. It was founded by the Dhaka Ahsania Mission in 1995.

Dhaka Ahsania Mission is a non-profit voluntary organization in Bangladesh. The mission was established in 1958 by Khan Bahadur Ahsanullah.

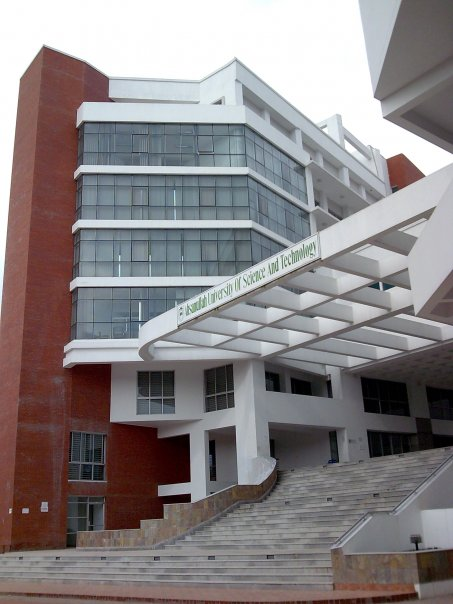
AUST Campus (Side View)

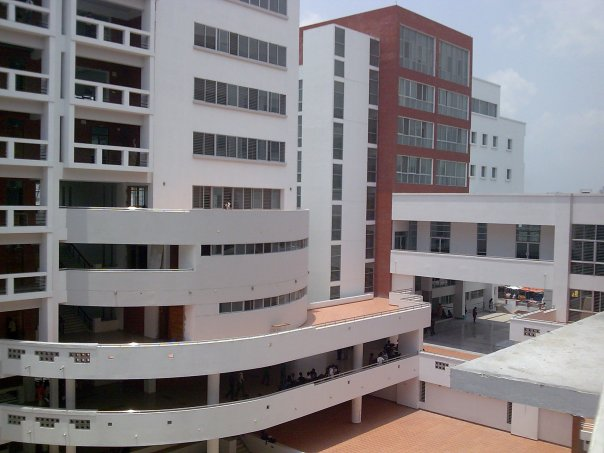
AUST Campus

== History ==
=== Establishment ===
Ahsanullah University of Science and Technology (AUST) was established in 1995 by Dhaka Ahsania Mission, a non-profit organization founded in 1958 by Khan Bahadur Ahsanullah, an educationist and social reformer. The university was established to expand opportunities for higher education in engineering, technology, and other academic disciplines in Bangladesh.

The establishment of AUST was envisioned in 1993 by Kazi Rafiqul Alam, then president and chief executive of Dhaka Ahsania Mission, following the introduction of legislation permitting private universities in Bangladesh in 1992. The university subsequently obtained government approval and began its academic activities in 1995.

=== Development of the permanent campus ===
AUST initially operated from a temporary campus in West Tejturi Bazar, Dhaka. The university subsequently developed a purpose-built campus in the Tejgaon Industrial Area.

The permanent campus was inaugurated on 31 March 2008 in a ceremony attended by then-President of Bangladesh Iajuddin Ahmed, who served as the university's chancellor. Constructed on approximately five bighas of land, the campus included a ten-storey academic building with two basement levels and a total floor area exceeding 400,000 square feet.

=== Permanent university charter ===
In 2013, AUST became the first private university in Bangladesh to receive a permanent government charter. The designation followed the university's establishment of a permanent campus and development of its academic infrastructure.

== Campus ==
The permanent campus of the university has been built on 5-bighas (1.676 acres) of land at Tejgaon Industrial Area which is located in the heart of Dhaka City.

The 10-storied building including 2-level basement has a total floor area of more than 4 lac sq.ft. It is the first ever permanent campus built by any private universities in Bangladesh.

The campus also provides facilities for co-curricular activities like common rooms (male & female), indoor game rooms, etc. as well as space for car parking and heavy machinery labs in the basements.

=== Campus and laboratory facilities ===
Aust operates from its permanent campus in the Tejgaon Industrial Area of Dhaka, Bangladesh. The purpose-built campus consists of interconnected academic and administrative blocks containing classrooms, laboratories, faculty offices, engineering workshops, a library, an auditorium, and student service facilities.

The university maintains specialized laboratories across its engineering and science departments. The Department of Civil Engineering operates laboratories for strength of materials, concrete, transportation engineering, hydraulics and fluid mechanics, geotechnical engineering, environmental engineering, and surveying.

The Department of Computer Science and Engineering maintains facilities for networking and data communication, web applications and multimedia, digital electronics, data and knowledge engineering, software engineering, microprocessors, operating systems, and application development. The Department of Electrical and Electronic Engineering provides laboratories for electrical circuits, control systems, power systems, power electronics, telecommunications, digital signal processing, and VLSI design.

The Department of Mechanical and Production Engineering operates laboratories for thermodynamics, fluid mechanics and machinery, heat and mass transfer, applied mechanics and materials, measurement and instrumentation, manufacturing, and engineering simulation. Its facilities also include machine shops, computer numerical control (CNC) manufacturing equipment, a wind tunnel, and 3D printing equipment.

Additional specialized facilities are maintained by the departments of Textile Engineering and Architecture, including laboratories for textile manufacturing, textile testing, building materials, and architectural fabrication.

The university's Kazi Fazlur Rahman Library provides printed and electronic academic resources, online catalog services, and a Digital Access Centre. The library also offers access to subscribed electronic resources through campus networking and remote access services.

== Administration ==
List of vice-chancellors

1. M. H. Khan (April 1995 – January 2007)
2. M. Anwar Hossain (February 2007 – January 2011)
3. Kazi Shariful Alam (February 2011 – July 2011)
4. A. M. M. Safiullah (August 2011 – 31 July 2019)
5. Kazi Shariful Alam (August 2019 – October 2019)
6. Md. Amanullah (October 2019 to December 2019)
7. Muhammad Fazli Ilahi (1 January 2020 – 31 December 2023)
8. Mohammed Mahbubur Rahman (1 January 2024 – 4 September 2024)
9. Md. Ashraful Hoque (5 September 2024 – present)

== Faculties and departments ==
Ahsanullah University of Science and Technology comprises four faculties offering undergraduate and postgraduate degree programs through its academic departments and schools.

Faculty of Architecture and Planning

- Department of Architecture
  - Bachelor of Architecture
  - Master of Architecture

Faculty of Engineering

- Department of Computer Science and Engineering
  - Bachelor of Science in Computer Science and Engineering (CSE)
- Department of Electrical and Electronic Engineering
  - Bachelor of Science in Electrical and Electronic Engineering (EEE)
  - Master of Science in Electrical and Electronic Engineering (EEE)
  - Master of Engineering in Electrical and Electronic Engineering
- Department of Civil Engineering
  - Bachelor of Science in Civil Engineering (CE)
  - Master of Science in Civil Engineering
  - Postgraduate Diploma in Civil Engineering
- Department of Mechanical and Production Engineering
  - Bachelor of Science in Mechanical Engineering (ME)
  - Bachelor of Science in Industrial and Production Engineering (IPE)
- Department of Textile Engineering
  - Bachelor of Science in Textile Engineering (TE)
- Department of Arts and Sciences
  - Master of Science in Mathematics

Faculty of Business and Social Sciences

- School of Business
  - Bachelor of Business Administration (BBA)
  - Master of Business Administration (MBA)
  - Executive Master of Business Administration (EMBA)

Faculty of Education

- Department of Education
  - Master of Education (M.Ed.)

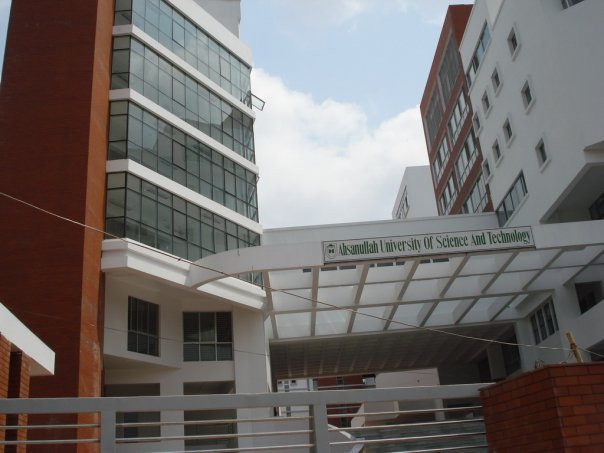
AUST campus entrance

=== Curriculum and academic structure ===
Ahsanullah University of Science and Technology (AUST) follows a semester-based, credit-hour academic system. Its undergraduate engineering programs generally have a duration of four years, divided into eight semesters, while the Bachelor of Architecture program has a duration of five years. The medium of instruction and examination is English.

The engineering curricula incorporate courses in mathematics, basic sciences, humanities, and discipline-specific engineering subjects, together with practical laboratory work. Individual programs also include project-based components. For example, the Textile Engineering program groups its courses into general education, core engineering, electives, and project and internship requirements.

Academic performance in undergraduate programs is evaluated through a credit-based grading system. Under the university's academic regulations, undergraduate students are required to attend at least 70% of scheduled classes in each course to qualify for the semester final examination.

=== Tuition and fees ===
As a private university, Ahsanullah University of Science and Technology charges tuition and other academic fees, which vary by program. According to its published fee schedule, the total institutional fees for a four-year undergraduate engineering program are Tk 917,950, while the five-year Bachelor of Architecture program has total fees of Tk 1,139,050, excluding additional transportation charges.

The university provides merit-based tuition fee waivers and financial assistance to eligible students, including awards covering 50% or 100% of tuition fees for qualifying engineering and architecture students.

=== Scholarships and financial assistance ===
Ahsanullah University of Science and Technology (AUST) provides merit-based tuition fee waivers and financial assistance to eligible undergraduate students. For engineering and architecture programs, students in the top 5% of each department based on their previous semester's grade point average are eligible for a full tuition fee waiver, while students in the next 5% are eligible for a 50% tuition fee waiver.

The university also provides a 50% tuition fee waiver to one member of an eligible pair of siblings or married students who are enrolled simultaneously, subject to application and institutional requirements. Financial assistance for students experiencing economic hardship is available through the Distressed Students Welfare Fund.

Students enrolled in the Bachelor of Business Administration program may receive tuition fee waivers based on their academic results in the Secondary School Certificate (SSC) and Higher Secondary Certificate (HSC) examinations. The university also offers tuition fee waivers for eligible students in its Master of Science in Mathematics program, based on their previous academic results.

== Research and innovation ==
=== Research administration and funding ===
Research activities at Ahsanullah University of Science and Technology (AUST) are coordinated through its Research and Publication Office (RPO), which operates under the Office of the Vice-Chancellor. The office administers internal and external research activities, oversees research grant applications, coordinates research ethics clearance, and organizes academic seminars involving researchers and industry professionals.

The university administers two research funding programs: the AUST Internal Research Grant (AIRG), which supports faculty research, and the AUST Student Research Grant (ASRG), which provides research funding opportunities for students. Both programs operate through periodic calls for proposals and evaluation procedures. By 2026, the university had announced the tenth round of AIRG funding and the third round of ASRG funding.

The RPO also coordinates applications for external research grants, industry–academia collaborative projects, and institutional research initiatives. The university maintains provisions for financial support for conference participation and incentives for journal publications by faculty members and students.

=== Research centers ===
The university operates a Center for Nanotechnology (CNT), which focuses on interdisciplinary research in nanoscience and engineering. Its stated research areas include nanophotonics, plasmonic nanoantennas, electromagnetic metasurfaces, terahertz and optical energy harvesting, and bio-optoelectronic sensing. The center includes academic staff from multiple departments, including electrical and electronic engineering, textile engineering, computer science and engineering, architecture, and arts and sciences.

AUST also identifies a Center of Excellence for Innovation, Incubation and Entrepreneurship among its institutional centers.

=== Research publications ===
AUST maintains an institutional research publication database documenting journal articles, conference papers, and other scholarly publications by its academic staff. The database provides bibliographic information, including publication titles, authors, publication years, journal or conference names, and digital object identifiers where available.

== International collaboration ==
Ahsanullah University of Science and Technology (AUST) has established academic and research collaborations with universities, research institutions, and other organizations in Bangladesh and abroad. The university maintains a register of memoranda of understanding (MoUs) covering cooperation in research, education, professional development, and institutional activities.

In November 2022, AUST signed a memorandum of understanding with Kalinga Institute of Industrial Technology (KIIT), India. The agreement covered cooperation in research and education, exchanges of students and academic staff, and institutional development.

On 6 July 2026, AUST signed a memorandum of understanding with the United Nations University Institute for Integrated Management of Material Fluxes and of Resources (UNU-FLORES), based in Dresden, Germany. The agreement established a framework for cooperation in research, education, capacity development, and knowledge exchange.

The university's records also document earlier agreements with Aalborg University in Denmark, Dublin City University in Ireland, and the University of Nice-Sophia Antipolis in France. These agreements were signed in different periods and had specified durations.

== Student life ==
=== Student organizations ===
Student extracurricular and co-curricular activities at Ahsanullah University of Science and Technology (AUST) are coordinated by the Office of the Advisor of Students' Welfare (ASW). The office oversees student organizations and activities involving technical education, cultural events, debating, sports, and community service.

The university's recognized student organizations include the AUST Debating Club, AUST Photography Club, AUST Innovation and Design Club, AUST Cultural Club, AUST Blood Donation Club, AUST Sports Club, AUST Career Development Club, AUST Programming and Informatics Club, AUST Robotics Club, AUST Environmental and Social Welfare Club, AUST Research and Publication Club, and AUST Ahsanullah (R.) Peace Club.

These organizations arrange and participate in debates, technical workshops, seminars, cultural programs, educational visits, sporting competitions, and voluntary activities. The AUST Robotics Club, established in 2021, organizes activities related to robotics and embedded systems, including workshops and competitions.

=== Student welfare and career services ===
The Office of the Advisor of Students' Welfare coordinates student support services, including career counseling, medical assistance, and financial aid. The university operates an on-campus medical center that provides first aid and medical consultation during office hours.

Career development activities are supported through the university's Career Counseling Center, which provides guidance to graduating students and assists with career planning. The university also organizes job fairs, workshops, seminars, and orientation programs for incoming students.

The university administers a welfare fund for students experiencing financial difficulties. The Office of the Advisor of Students' Welfare also coordinates voluntary blood donation activities and other community service initiatives.

== Accreditation and rankings ==
=== Accreditation ===
The academic programs of the university are recognized by the following organizations:

- University Grants Commission (UGC)
- Institution of Engineers, Bangladesh (IEB)
- Institute of Architects, Bangladesh (IAB)
- Institution of Textile Engineers and Technologists (ITET)

Ahsanullah University of Science and Technology (AUST) is recognized by the University Grants Commission of Bangladesh (UGC). Professional accreditation of engineering programs is administered separately through relevant accreditation bodies.

The undergraduate program in Electrical and Electronic Engineering was reaccredited by the Board of Accreditation for Engineering and Technical Education (BAETE), under the Institution of Engineers, Bangladesh, for a six-year period from 1 July 2025 to 30 June 2031. The university announced the reaccreditation on 22 July 2026.

=== Rankings ===
AUST was placed in the 1501+ ranking band in the QS Sustainability Rankings 2026, published by Quacquarelli Symonds (QS).

== Recognition and achievements ==
Bachelor's degrees of AUST are recognized by Bangladesh University of Engineering & Technology (BUET), the leading and one of the oldest universities in the public sector of Bangladesh, for pursuing M.Sc. courses offered by BUET.

Relevant degree programmes at AUST are accredited by the Institution of Engineers, Bangladesh (IEB), the Institute of Architects, Bangladesh (IAB), and the Institute of Textile Engineers & Technologists, Bangladesh (ITET). The University Grants Commission of Bangladesh (UGC) has approved AUST's newly constructed campus, which includes modern educational facilities and infrastructure, as the university's permanent campus.

In 2021, Ahsanullah University of Science and Technology professor Saifur Rahman became the first Institute of Electrical and Electronics Engineers president from South Asia.

== Notable alumni ==
- Munjarin Mahbub Abony – Bangladeshi model and beauty pageant titleholder; winner of Mrs. Bangladesh 2019.
- Md. Walid Bin Quashem – Bangladeshi diplomat and Electrical and Electronic Engineering graduate who ranked first in the national merit list of the 34th Bangladesh Civil Service examination (BCS) in 2015, making him the first person from private universities to rank 1st position nationwide.
