= Rebekah Bruesehoff =

American activist (born 2007)

- Born: January 1, 2007 (age 19); Camden County, New Jersey, United States
- Occupations: Activist; author
- Years active: 2017–present
- Website: www.rebekahbruesehoff.com

Rebekah Bruesehoff (born January 1, 2007) is an American LGBTQ rights activist, social media influencer, and author. As a child, Bruesehoff began attending protests with her mother; she became involved as a prominent supporter of transgender youth in response to the Donald Trump administration rescinding Obama-era protections for trans students.

== Early life ==
Bruesehoff was assigned male at birth and was gender non-conforming by the time she was two or three years old. Bruesehoff suffered from depression as a young child, even attempting suicide. She discovered the concept of gender transition at age eight, and strongly identified with the term "transgender". After informing her parents of her gender identity, they were supportive and allowed her to socially transition.

Before her transition, Bruesehoff tried playing sports, including gymnastics and soccer, but felt out of place on boys' teams. She began playing field hockey on a girls' team when she was 10. She later also began playing clarinet and taking ballet lessons.

== Activism ==
=== Early advocacy and Marvel's Hero Project (2018–2020) ===
As a 10-year-old from Vernon Township, New Jersey, Bruesehoff spoke to a crowd of two hundred people at a Jersey City rally, sharing her experience as a young transgender person. She held up a sign that said, "I'm the scary transgender person the media warned you about". A photo of her with the sign went viral. Around this time, Bruesehoff's household was inspected by the Child Protective Services, due to an anonymous transphobic claim that her parents were "forcing" her to present herself as a girl.

In June 2018, she spoke at a youth gathering at the Evangelical Lutheran Church in America (ELCA) in Houston, Texas. She was the first transgender person to do so, with the intention to set a precedent for transgender participation in the church.

In December 2018, she testified before the state legislature in support of a bill that would require New Jersey schools to include notable contributions made by LGBTQ+ people in the statewide secondary school curriculum across all disciplines . The bill was passed by the Senate and Assembly in 2018, with governor Phil Murphy signing it into law in 2019.

In February 2019, she published her first op-ed in The Philadelphia Inquirer. She wrote in support of the Babs Siperstein Law; the bill was placed into effect, allowing her to modify the gender marker on her birth certificate to match her correct gender identity. In 2019, she became part of Marvel's Hero Project as the first transgender "superhero", named Mighty Rebekah.

=== Recent work and book publishing (2020–present) ===
During the COVID-19 pandemic, Bruesehoff placed as a top-twenty finalist for Time and Nickelodeon's 2020 Kid of the Year award. Live during the special, she shared an original story called An Act of Awesome, with Neil Patrick Harris introducing her and her work. Nickelodeon would go on to employ an advertisement featuring Bruesehoff for Trans Day of Visibility in 2022.

On October 8, 2020, she was a figure of National Coming Out Day, featured on USA Today.

In 2021, Bruesehoff published her first book, A Kids Book About Being Inclusive, in collaboration with fellow activist Ashton Mota and GenderCool.

In 2022, she attended the Tory Burch Foundation's Embrace Ambition Summit in New York City.

In 2023, Human Rights Campaign featured her and her mother in a video and article advocating for transgender rights in sports at the high school level. On May 16, 2023, Brusehoff was awarded "Free to Be You and Me Award" at the Ms. Foundation's Woman of Vision Awards. In October 2023, she was named one of GLAAD's 20 Under 20.

In 2024, she was featured in the graphic novel anthology Becoming Who We Are: Real Stories About Growing Up Trans.

== Personal life ==
Bruesehoff's father is a Lutheran pastor. According to an essay she co-wrote with her Mother on October 11, 2025 for Out, she graduated 2024 as high school valedictorian.
