= Munjarin Mahbub Abony =

Bangladeshi beauty pageant titleholder

Munjarin Abony
- Born: Dhaka, Bangladesh
- Education: Ahsanullah University of Science and Technology
- Beauty pageant titleholder
- Title: Mrs World Bangladesh 2019; World Miss University Bangladesh 2015
- Major competitions: World Miss University Bangladesh 2015 (winner); World Miss University 2016 (Unplaced); Mrs Bangladesh 2019 (winner); Mrs. World 2019 (Unplaced)

Munjarin Mahbub Abony is a Bangladeshi model, Engineer, Entrepreneur, Social worker & dancer, best known for winning the title of Mrs. World Bangladesh 2019. She won the first beauty pageant for married women in Bangladesh, Mrs. World Bangladesh 2019.She later represented Bangladesh at the Mrs. World 2019 pageant in Las Vegas, where she received the prestigious Ambassador Award for her humanitarian work. .

== Education ==
Munjarin Mahbub Abony was born in Dhaka. She completed her Bachelor of Science degree in mechanical engineering under the Ahsanullah University of Science and Technology.

== Career ==
Abony's modeling debut was in an advert for Grameen Phone. She competed at World Miss University 2016 in China as a peace ambassador. In 2019 Abony participated won the first ever Mrs Bangladesh title. She had been the brand ambassador of Walton home appliances.

== Social activities ==
Abony’s passion for social activism goes beyond public speaking. She is a Director of Astha Foundation, a non-profit organization that provides food, education, healthcare, and housing for underprivileged children and the elderly. She has personally participated in humanitarian efforts, such as distributing emergency flood relief in Rangpur. She also launched her own dance school, Abony’s, which includes a special project offering free training to children with disabilities. Drawing from her experience teaching children with Down syndrome, the school focuses on helping students build communication and creative skills through dance. She has worked on a national awareness campaign in collaboration with Save the Children, titled "Stop Unnecessary C-Section", advocating for better maternal healthcare practices in Bangladesh. . As an ambassador of Mrs World organization, she visited many countries to serve underprivileged children and old people.

== Awards and nominations ==
Year	Award	Location	Source
2016	World Miss University Bangladesh	China	
2019	Mrs Bangladesh	Bangladesh	
2020	Mrs World Bangladesh	Las Vegas	
2020	Mrs World Ambassador	Las Vegas	
