= Brooke Guinan =

American firefighter

Brooke Guinan is an American firefighter and trans rights activist. She (Note: Guinan uses both she/her and they/them pronouns, this article uses she/her for consistency) is notable for being the first openly transgender member of the New York City Fire Department.

== Career ==
Guinan joined the New York City Fire Department (FDNY) in 2008. She is a third-generation member of the organization preceded by her father, George V, who was a lieutenant, and her grandfather George IV, who was a captain. In addition to firefighting, she has acted as the FDNY's LGBTQ outreach coordinator.

== Personal life ==
Guinan initially came out as a trans woman in 2011, before later coming out as non-binary. She named herself Brooke after the character Brooke Davis from One Tree Hill.

In 2017, Guinan served as a grand marshal of the 2017 NYC Pride March. She was the first individual transgender public safety employee to be a grand marshal of the March.

== Media appearances ==
In 2014, Guinan participated in a campaign by the Vocal Organization for International Courage and Equality (V.O.I.C.E.), posing for a picture where she wore her fightfighter gear and a shirt reading "So Trans, So What?"

Guinan is the subject of the 2016 documentary Woman on Fire directed by Julie Sokolow. Sokolow was inspired to make the documentary after seeing Guinan's V.O.I.C.E. picture.

She is featured in the 2024 graphic novel anthology Becoming Who We Are: Real Stories About Growing Up Trans.
