= Mohammad Rafiqul Islam (academic) =

Bangladeshi academic

Mohammad Rafiqul Islam (Bengali: মোহাম্মদ রফিকুল ইসলাম) is a Bangladeshi academic who served as vice-chancellor of the Islamic University of Technology, funded by the Organisation of Islamic Cooperation. He is a professor of marine engineering at the Bangladesh University of Engineering and Technology.

== Early life ==
Islam was born on 19 March 1969. He did his bachelor's degree in naval architecture and marine engineering at the Bangladesh University of Engineering and Technology in 1993. He did his master's degree in 1997 in engineering at the Bangladesh University of Engineering and Technology. He did his PhD at the Yokohama National University in 2001.

== Career ==
Islam joined the Department of Naval Architecture and Marine Engineering of Bangladesh University of Engineering and Technology as a lecturer in 1994.

Islam became a full professor in 2009. From 15 December 2011 to 15 December 2013, he was the head of the Department of Naval Architecture and Marine Engineering at the Bangladesh University of Engineering and Technology.

Islam taught at King Abdulaziz University. He was a visiting faculty at the Universiti Malaysia Terengganu and University of Technology Malaysia. He was the director of the Institutional Quality Assurance Cell at the Bangladesh University of Engineering and Technology.

Islam was appointed vice-chancellor of the Islamic University of Technology on 1 September 2020. He was a member of the syndicate board of Bangabandhu Sheikh Mujibur Rahman Maritime University. He was a director of Khulna Shipyard Limited.
