= Kate Stone (engineer) =

British engineer and founder and CEO of Novalia

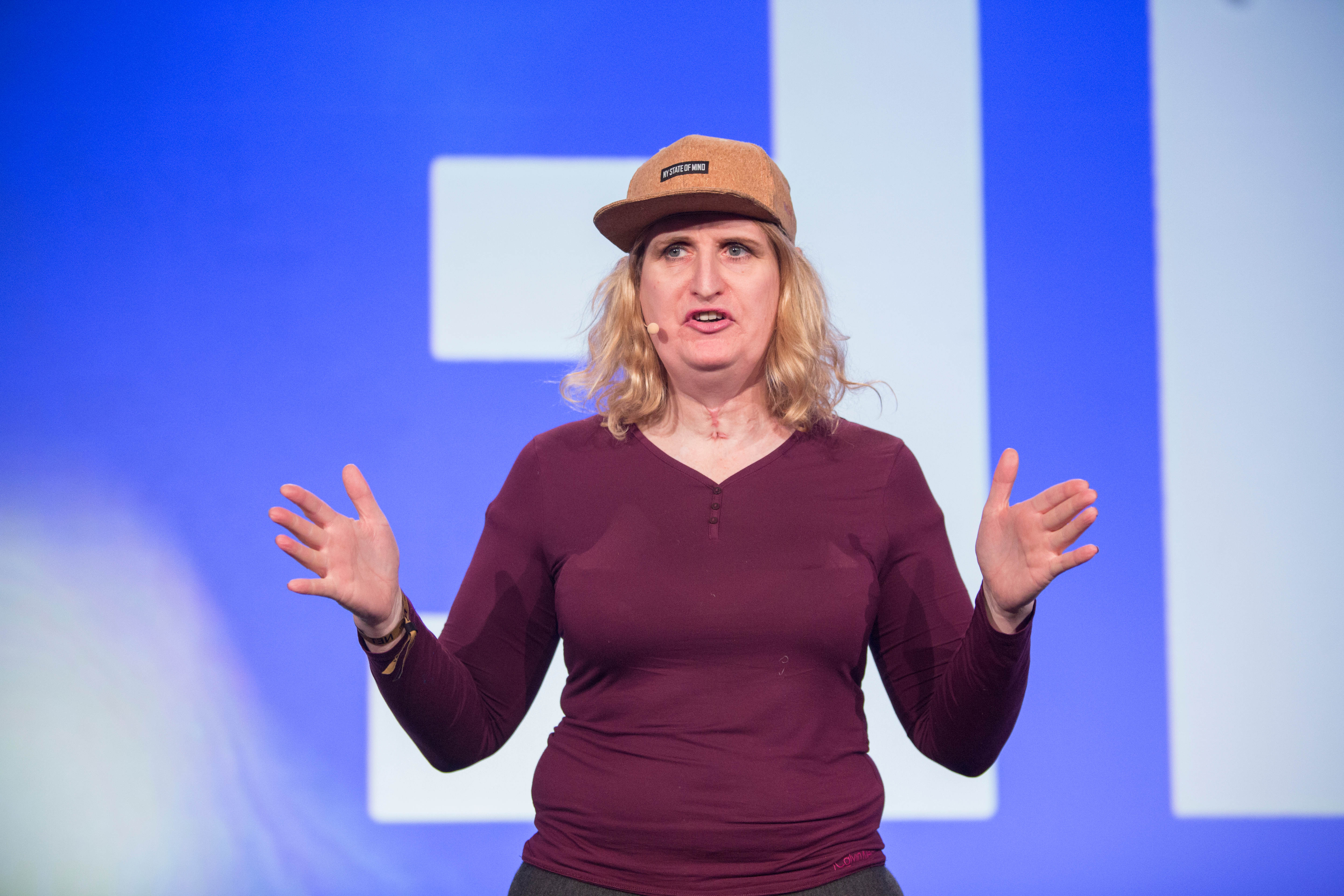
- Stone speaking at re:publica in Berlin, 2016
- Born: Cheshire, England, United Kingdom
- Education: University of Salford; University of Cambridge
- Scientific career
- Workplaces: University of Cambridge; Plastic Logic; Novalia
- Website: www.drkatestone.com

Kate Stone is an English engineer and founder and CEO of the company Novalia which has developed products using "Interactive Printed Media".

== Education ==
Stone has a degree in electronics from University of Salford, and a PhD in physics from University of Cambridge with the Cavendish Laboratory.

== Career ==
Stone founded the company Novalia in 2006. The company has developed the use of ordinary printing presses to produce interactive electronics, with touch-sensitive inks and printed circuits. She has termed these products "Interactive Printed Media" (IPM). The company has worked on advertising campaigns for Bud Light, The Hershey Company, IKEA, Pizza Hut, and McDonald's. She has presented her vision of interactive print at many global forums and conferences, including "DJ decks made of...paper" at TED2013 and "The press trampled on my privacy. Here's how I took back my story" at TED2018, Observer Ideas and Creative Science Sessions. Stone's work on interactive electronics was featured on a television documentary for Sky Arts. She has also contributed to NASA's Space Apps Data Bootcamp in 2016.

She is a member of the Editors Code of Practice committee.

== Personal life ==
Stone was born in Cheshire, England, United Kingdom, but now lives in Woodstock, New York, United States. She is transgender, and transitioned in 2007.

== In popular culture ==
Stone was featured in the 2024 graphic novel anthology Becoming Who We Are: Real Stories About Growing Up Trans.
