= Mahbubur Rahman (architect) =

Mohammed Mahbubur Rahman
- Occupations: Architect, academic, researcher

Academic background
- Education: Bangladesh University of Engineering and Technology, University of Nottingham

Academic work
- Discipline: Architecture, Urban Design
- Institutions: Ahsanullah University of Science and Technology, North South University, Universiti Teknologi Malaysia

Mohammed Mahbubur Rahman is a Bangladeshi architect, academic, and researcher. He is the Pro-Vice Chancellor of Ahsanullah University of Science and Technology.

== Early life and education ==
Rahman studied architecture at the Bangladesh University of Engineering and Technology, where he began his academic career in 1985. He later completed his PhD in Urban Design and Housing at the University of Nottingham, supported by a Commonwealth Scholarship, the Leche Trust Scholarship, and the Sir Ernest Cassel Grant. He was also awarded the prestigious Robert McNamara Fellowship.

== Career ==
Rahman has taught architecture, urban design, and construction-related subjects at universities in Bangladesh, Canada, the United Kingdom, Malaysia, Oman, Bahrain, and Saudi Arabia. He held professorial roles at North South University, Universiti Teknologi Malaysia, Kingdom University, and Alasala University, Saudi Arabia. As a researcher, Rahman has published over 110 scholarly papers and authored or edited seven books. His acclaimed book City of an Architect, which explores Dhaka's architectural heritage, won the BAKU Book Prize.

Rahman led the design of major projects including the Bangladesh Bank Headquarters, Dilkusha Centre, Sabbir Tower, and several educational, religious, and civic buildings across Asia, Africa, and North America. He served as the General Secretary of the Institute of Architects Bangladesh from 2005 to 2006.

Rahman has consulted for numerous national and international organisations, including the World Bank, Asian Development Bank, Commonwealth Foundation, Ford Foundation, and several government ministries. His consultancy work has contributed to national policy documents such as the Dhaka Structure Plan, the National Building Code, housing policies, and planning bylaws.

Rahman was appointed Pro-Vice Chancellor of Ahsanullah University of Science and Technology in November 2021. He was the acting vice-chancellor of Ahsanullah University of Science and Technology in 2024. He offered 40 full scholarships to students from Gaza.
