= Mahbubur Rahman (engineer) =

Bangladeshi engineer

Md. Mahbubur Rahman
- Born: 1 September 1963 (age 62); Shariatpur District, Bangladesh
- Education: Masters
- Alma mater: Bangladesh University of Engineering and Technology, Norwegian University of Science and Technology
- Occupations: Bangladeshi engineer and former chairman of Bangladesh Power Development Board

Md. Mahbubur Rahman is a Bangladeshi engineer and chairman of Bangladesh Power Development Board, the regulatory agency responsible for power stations and distribution systems in Bangladesh.

== Early life ==
Rahman was born on 1 September 1963 in Shariatpur District, East Pakistan, Pakistan. In 1986, he completed his B.Sc. in Engineering from the Bangladesh University of Engineering and Technology. He got a master's degree in Hydropower Development from Norwegian University of Science and Technology.

== Career ==
Rahman joined Siddhirganj Power Station as an Assistant Engineer on 1 September 1986.

Rahman worked at the Shiddhirgonj Thermal power station project as Sub-Divisional Engineer. He served as Chief Engineer of Private Generation.

In 2007, Rahman was the Project Director of Dhaka Tannery Estate Project under the Bangladesh Small and Cottage Industries Corporation responsible for relocating tanneries from Dhaka.

Rahman was the distribution member of the Bangladesh Power Development Board. He was the corporate member of the Bangladesh Power Development Board. He served as Director IPP Cell-1, and Director of IPP Cell-3.

On 31 January 2022, Rahman was appointed the 38th chairman of Bangladesh Power Development Board. He was reappointed chairman in September 2022 for a one year term. He is a director of Northwest Power Generation Company. He is the president of Bangabandhu Prokousholi Parishad unit for Bangladesh Power Development Board. He spoke at the 2022 Gas Turbine Technical Seminar organized by Mitsubishi Power. He oversaw the board signing an agreement with ACWA Power, a Saudi Arabian company, to build 1000 MW solar power plant.

Rahman accompanied Energy Advisor to Prime Minister Sheikh Hasina, Dr Tawfiq-e-Elahi Chowdhury, to S Alam Group's power projects in Chittagong District. On 31 August 2023, his term was extended for one year. He is a director of Bangladesh-China Power Company (Pvt.) Limited. He is a director of the Power Grid Company of Bangladesh Limited.
