= Abdul Matin Patwari =

Bangladeshi academic

4th Vice-Chancellor of Bangladesh University of Engineering and Technology
- In office 24 April 1983 – 25 April 1987
- Preceded by: Wahiduddin Ahmed
- Succeeded by: Musharrof Husain Khan

Director General of Islamic University of Technology
- In office May 1987 – 1998
- Preceded by: Rafiquddin Ahmad
- Succeeded by: M Anwar Hossain

Vice-Chancellor of University of Asia Pacific
- In office 7 September 2004 – 2012
- Preceded by: M. R. Kabir
- Succeeded by: Jamilur Reza Choudhury

Personal details
- Born: 1 January 1935 (age 91) Laksam Upazila, Comilla District, Bengal Presidency, British India
- Education: Ph.D. (electrical engineering)
- Alma mater: Rajshahi College; Ahsanullah Engineering College; Texas A&M University
- Occupation: university academic

Abdul Matin Patwari (Bengali: আব্দুল মতিন পাটোয়ারি; born 1 January 1935) is a Bangladeshi academic. He served as the 4th vice-chancellor of Bangladesh University of Engineering and Technology.

== Education ==
Patwari passed matriculation examination from Matlabganj J. B. Pilot High School in Comilla in 1950 (stood 1st place) and intermediate examination from Rajshahi College in 1952 (Stood 2nd place). He earned his bachelor's in electrical engineering from Ahsanullah Engineering College (now BUET) in 1956, M.S. in electrical engineering in 1961 from the Texas A & M University; M.A. in mathematics in 1963 from University of California, Berkeley and Ph.D. in electrical engineering in 1967 from Sheffield University, U.K.

== Career ==
Patwari joined as a lecturer in Ahsanullah Engineering College in December 1956. He served as the vice-chancellor of Bangladesh University of Engineering and Technology (BUET) from April 1983 until April 1987. He retired from BUET in April 1991. Patwari joined Islamic Centre for Technical and Vocational Training and Research (ICTVTR), now known as Islamic University of Technology (IUT) which is subsidiary organ of Organization of Islamic Cooperation (OIC), as director general (DG) on 1 May 1987. He retired from the university in 1998.

Patwari served as vice-chancellor of University of Asia Pacific in Dhaka from 2004 until 2012.
