= Islamic University of Technology =

University in Bangladesh

Coordinates: 23°56′53″N 90°22′44″E

- ইসলামিক ইউনিভার্সিটি অব টেকনোলজি
- Other name: IUT
- Former names: Islamic Center for Technical, Vocational Training and Research (1978-1995); Islamic Institute of Technology (1995-2001)
- Type: International
- Established: 1978; 48 years ago
- Accreditation: IEB; OIC; IAU
- Affiliations: UGC; AACSB
- Chancellor: Ismail Ould Cheikh Ahmed (Secretary General of OIC)
- Vice-Chancellor: Dr. Md Mamun Bin Ibne Reaz
- Academic staff: 247 (2023)
- Administrative staff: 200+
- Students: 3,067 (2025)
- Undergraduates: 2,865 (2025)
- Postgraduates: 202 (2025)
- Location: Gazipur, Dhaka Division, Bangladesh
- Campus: Suburban, 30 acres (12 ha)
- Language: English
- Colors: Green and White
- Website: iutoic-dhaka.edu
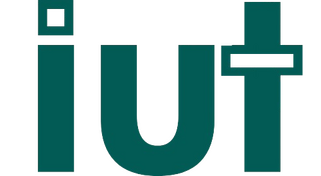

University rankings

Global – Overall
- QS World: 1201-1400 (2026)

Regional – Overall
- QS Asia: 448 (2026)

Islamic University of Technology (IUT; Bengali: ইসলামিক ইউনিভার্সিটি অব টেকনোলজি) is an international engineering technological research university located in Gazipur, Bangladesh. IUT offers undergraduate and graduate programs in engineering and technical education.

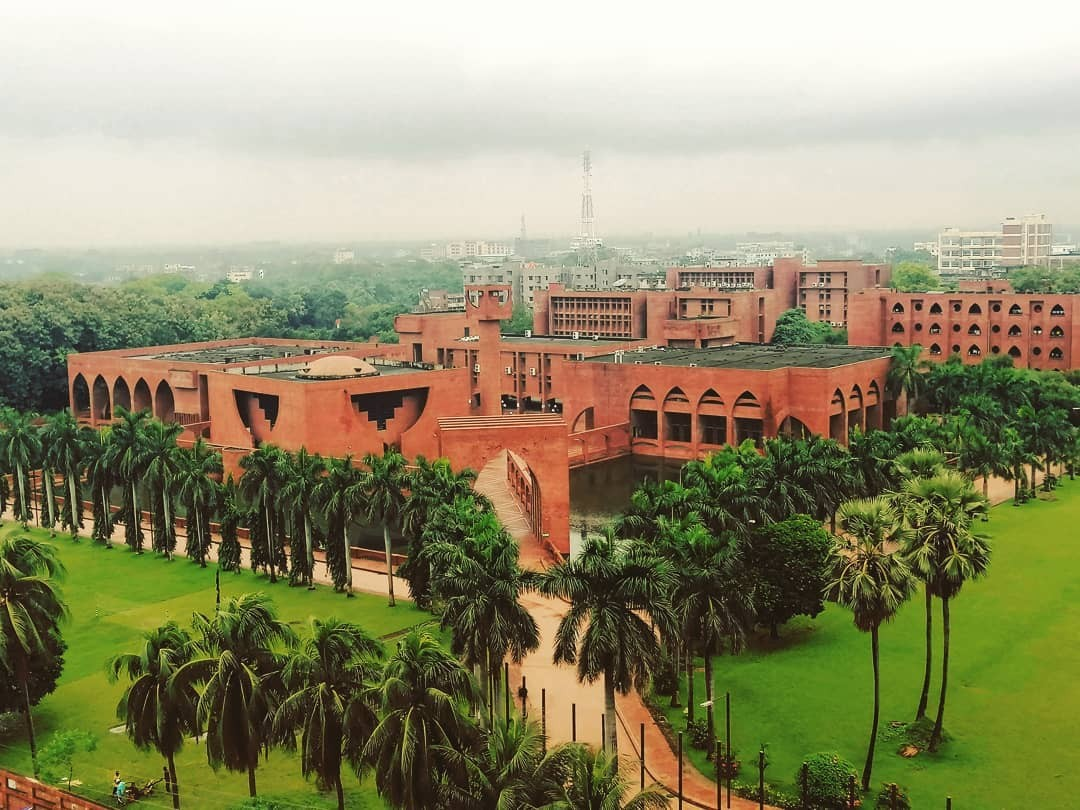
Aerial view of IUT

IUT is a subsidiary organ of the Organisation of Islamic Cooperation (OIC). The university receives endowment from OIC member states and offers scholarships to the allocated number of students in the form of tuition waivers and free accommodation.

The campus was designed by Turkish architect Mehmet Doruk Pamir, an MIT graduate.

== Accreditation/Affiliation ==
IUT is affiliated with / accredited by the following organizations:

- International Association of Universities (IAU)
- Federation of the Universities of the Islamic World (FUMI)
- Institution of Engineers, Bangladesh (IEB)
- University Grants Commission of Bangladesh (UGC)
- Association to Advance Collegiate Schools of Business (AACSB)
IUT Campus
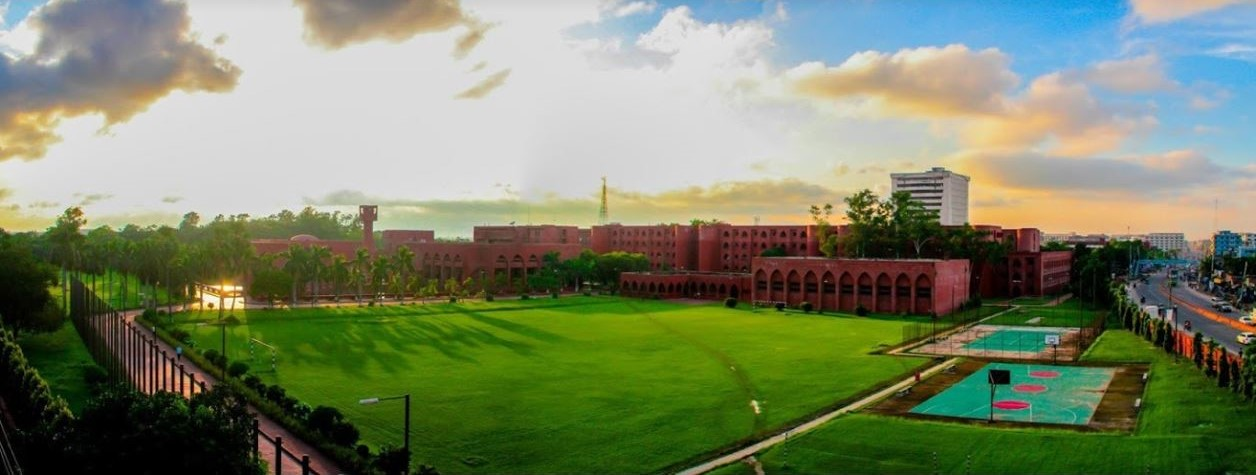
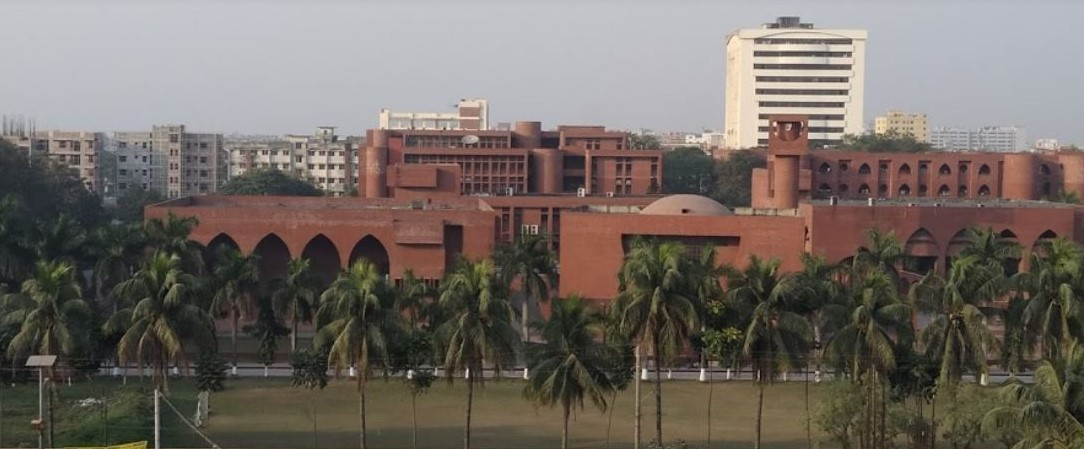

== History ==
Islamic University of Technology, established in 1978, was first known as Islamic Center for Technical, Vocational Training and Research (ICTVTR). It was proposed in the 9th Islamic Conference of Foreign Ministers (ICFM) held in Dakar, Senegal, on 24–28 April 1978. The establishment of IUT in Dhaka, Bangladesh, was then approved by the OIC foreign ministers. All the members of the Organisation of the Islamic Conference (OIC) agreed to co-operate for the implementation of the project.

By June 1979, the government of Bangladesh had acquired a 30-acre parcel of land at Tongi for the center.

The implementation of the infrastructure commenced with the holding of the first meeting of the Board of Governors in June 1979. The foundation stone of ICTVTR was laid by President Ziaur Rahman of Bangladesh on 27 March 1981 in the presence of Yasir Arafat, the then-chairman of the PLO, and Habib Chatty, the then-Secretary General of OIC. The construction of the campus was completed in 1987 at a cost of US$11 million[US$25 million (2019)] . ICTVTR was formally inaugurated by Hossain Mohammad Ershad, president of Bangladesh, on 14 July 1988.

The 22nd ICFM, held in Casablanca, Morocco, on 10–11 December 1994, renamed the ICTVTR as the Islamic Institute of Technology (IIT). IIT was formally inaugurated by Begum Khaleda Zia, prime minister of Bangladesh, on 21 September 1995. The 28th ICFM, held in Bamako, Mali, on 25–29 June 2001, commended the efforts of IIT and decided to rename the IIT as Islamic University of Technology (IUT). IUT was formally inaugurated by Begum Khaleda Zia, prime minister of Bangladesh, on 29 November 2001.

Over the past three decades, IUT has expanded with the construction of new academic buildings, halls of residence, and student facilities.

The university started offering regular courses from December 1986 and completed 38 academic years in 2026.

== Administration and governance ==
=== Administrative structure ===
Joint General Assembly
The Islamic Commission for Economic, Cultural and Social Affairs consisting of all member states of the OIC, acts as the Joint General Assembly of the subsidiary organs, including IUT. This assembly acts as the General Assembly of the university. It determines the general policy and provides general guidance. It examines the activities of the university and submits recommendations to the ICFM. Internal rules and regulations that govern the internal activities are shaped through the decisions of this assembly. It elects the members of the governing body and examines the whole budget for a year. The Finance Control Organ of the university audits the financial possessions of the university and submits it to this assembly.
Governing Board
It is composed of nine members, including a member from the host country, who are selected by the Joint General Assembly. Members are selected as per geographical distribution and importance of the countries and people. The secretary general of OIC or his representative and the vice-chancellor of the university become members of this board by their status. They are included as ex-officio members. This board focuses on the precision activities and programs of IUT and sends recommendations to the Joint General Assembly. This is the body that consults about the promoting measures of IUT with the General Secretariat, and it approves the final curricula of training and research programs. One of its prime jobs is to grant degrees, diplomas, and certificates according to academic regulations.
Executive Committee
This is an organ of the Governing Board and is empowered to deal, between meetings of the board, with any matter that may be referred to it by the vice-chancellor or that may be delegated by the board. All interim actions of this committee are reported to the Governing Board. The executive committee of the board consists of the secretary of the Ministry of Labour and Employment of Bangladesh as the chairman, heads of the diplomatic missions of the member states of OIC in Bangladesh (to be nominated by the Governing Board), and the vice-chancellor of IUT as a general member.
Academic Council
Subject to other provisions, this council advises the Governing Board on all academic matters. It makes the proper conduct of teaching, training, and examinations and distributes the awards of fellowship, scholarship, medals, and prizes.

Some statutory committees are formed to ensure management of programmes and activities in the relevant and related fields. These committees include the Administrative Advisory Committee, Departmental Committee, Disciplinary Committee, Finance Committee, Planning and Development Committee, Research Committee, Selection Committee, Students' Welfare Committee, Syllabus Committee.

=== List of vice-chancellors ===
1. Rafiquddin Ahmad (Director, May 1979 – April 1987)
2. Prof. Dr. Abdul Matin Patwari (Director General, May 1987 – April 1999)
3. Prof. Dr. M Anwar Hossain (May 1999 – Jan 2003)
4. Prof. Dr. Muhammad Fazli Ilahi (January 2003 – March 2008)
5. Prof. Dr. M. Imtiaz Hossain (April 2008 – March 2016)
6. Prof. Dr. Munaz Ahmed Noor (April 2016 – February 2018)
7. Dr. Omar Jah, Acting Vice-Chancellor (February 2018 – August 2020)
8. Prof. Dr. M. Rafiqul Islam (September 2020 – June 2026)
9. Prof. Dr. Md Mamun Bin Ibne Reaz (June 2026 – present)

== Academics ==
The academic year at the university begins in January. Each academic year is composed of two semesters - Winter and Summer. An undergraduate degree takes four years of full-time study to complete, and a master's degree takes two years to complete. The medium of instruction is English. Generally, at the end of every year, academic commencement takes place for the graduating students.

=== Faculties and departments ===
Undergraduate and graduate programmes are offered by six departments under two faculties. The faculties are the Faculty of Engineering and the Faculty of Science & Technical Education.

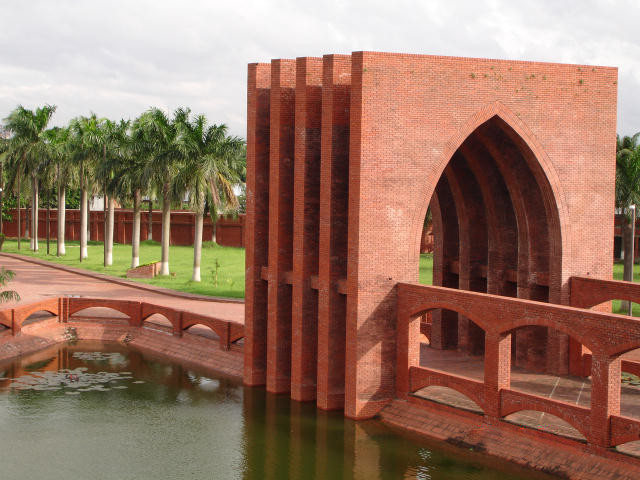
Five Fundamentals Gate

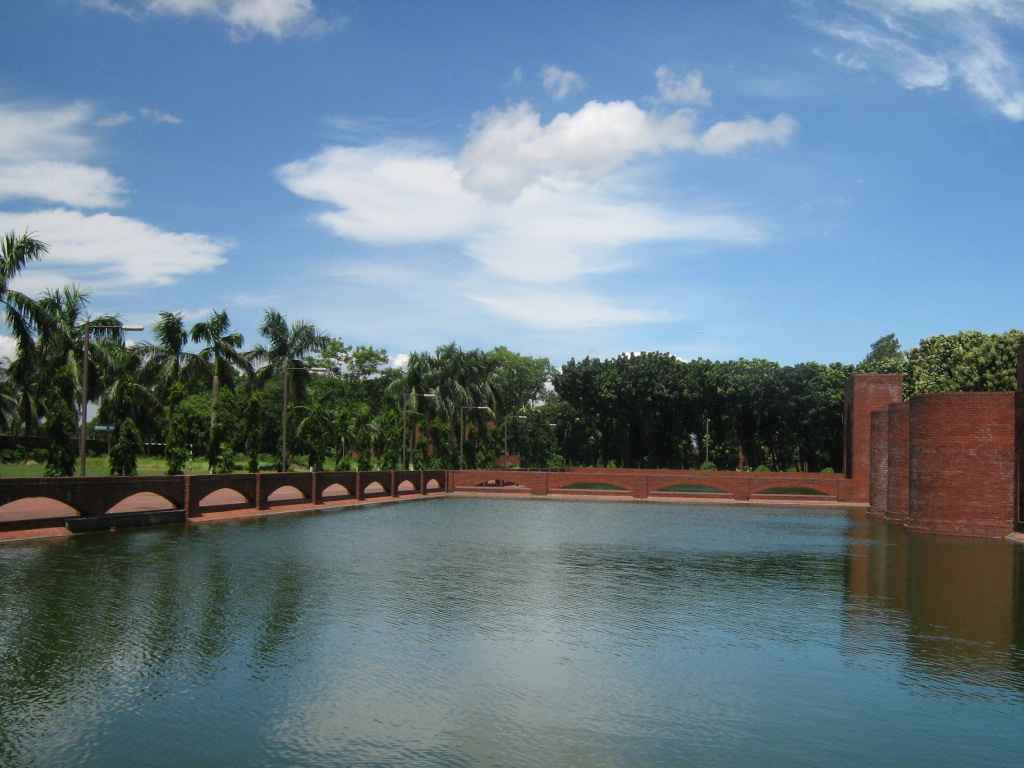
Lake

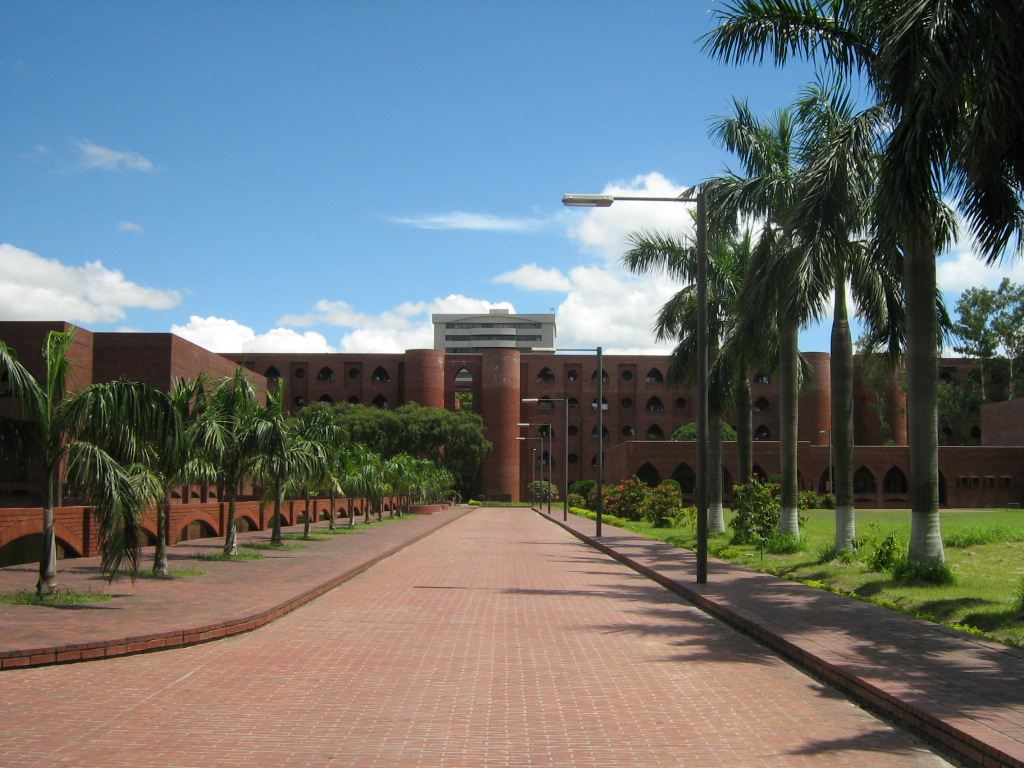
South Hall of Residence and Student Center

==== Faculty of Engineering and Technology ====
- Department of Computer Science & Engineering (CSE)
- Department of Electrical & Electronic Engineering (EEE)
- Department of Mechanical & Production Engineering (MPE)
- Department of Civil & Environmental Engineering (CEE)

==== Faculty of Science & Technical Education ====
- Department of Business and Technology Management (BTM)
- Department of Technical and Vocational Education (TVE)
- Department of Natural Sciences (NSc)

=== Institute ===
- Institute of Energy and Environment (IEE)

=== Rankings ===
In the 2026 edition of QS World University Rankings, the university ranked 1201–1400 in the world ranking and 421-430 among the Asian universities.

== Enrollment ==
IUT was established to support students from the OIC member states. Students from South Asia, the Middle East, and Africa join the university every year. Admissions are highly competitive, with thousands competing for limited, coveted seats. Students are admitted once per academic year. The admission process starts in March and wraps up by June.

=== Undergraduate programmes ===
Every year 720 students are accepted to various undergraduate programmes. Prospective international students from over fifty OIC member states are selected by the nominating authority of the respective member state.

Students from the host country, Bangladesh, are selected based on placement tests conducted by the university. Thousands of initial applicants are screened to select about 8,000 applicants for the placement test based on their secondary and higher-secondary level results (grades in mathematics, physics, chemistry and English). Out of the 8,000 students appearing for the placement test, the top 10% are accepted for admission.

=== Graduate programmes ===
Around 160 students are accepted in various graduate programmes on an annual basis. Postgraduate degrees offered by various departments are Master of Science in engineering, Master of Engineering, and PhD (Doctor of Philosophy). Graduate students are selected by Post Graduate Committee (PGC) of respective departments. Similar to undergraduate admission, international students are selected by the nominating authority of the respective OIC member state. Students from the host country are required to appear for an interview/placement test.

== Engineering and technology programmes ==
=== Graduate programmes ===
==== Doctor of Philosophy (Ph.D.) ====
1. Computer Science and Engineering (CSE)
2. Computer Science and Applications (CSA)
3. Electrical and Electronic Engineering (EEE)
4. Mechanical Engineering (ME)
5. Civil Engineering (CE)

==== Master of Science in Engineering (M.Sc. Engg.) / Master of Engineering (M. Engg.) ====
1. Computer Science and Engineering (CSE)
2. Computer Science and Application (CSA)
3. Electrical and Electronic Engineering (EEE)
4. Mechanical Engineering (ME)
5. Civil Engineering (CE)

==== Doctor of Philosophy (PhD) / Master of Science (MScTE) in Technical Education ====
1. Computer Science and Engineering (CSE)
2. Electrical and Electronic Engineering (EEE)
3. Mechanical Engineering (ME)

=== Undergraduate programmes ===
==== Bachelor of Science in Engineering (B.Sc. Engg.) ====
1. Computer Science and Engineering (CSE)
2. Electrical and Electronic Engineering (EEE)
3. Software Engineering (SWE)
4. Mechanical Engineering (ME)
5. Civil Engineering (CE)
6. Industrial and Production Engineering (IPE)

==== Bachelor of Business Administration (BBA) ====
1. Business & Technology Management (BTM)

==== Bachelor of Science in Technical Education (BScTE) ====
1. Computer Science and Engineering (CSE)
2. Electrical and Electronic Engineering (EEE)
3. Mechanical Engineering (ME)

== Campus ==
=== Academic buildings ===
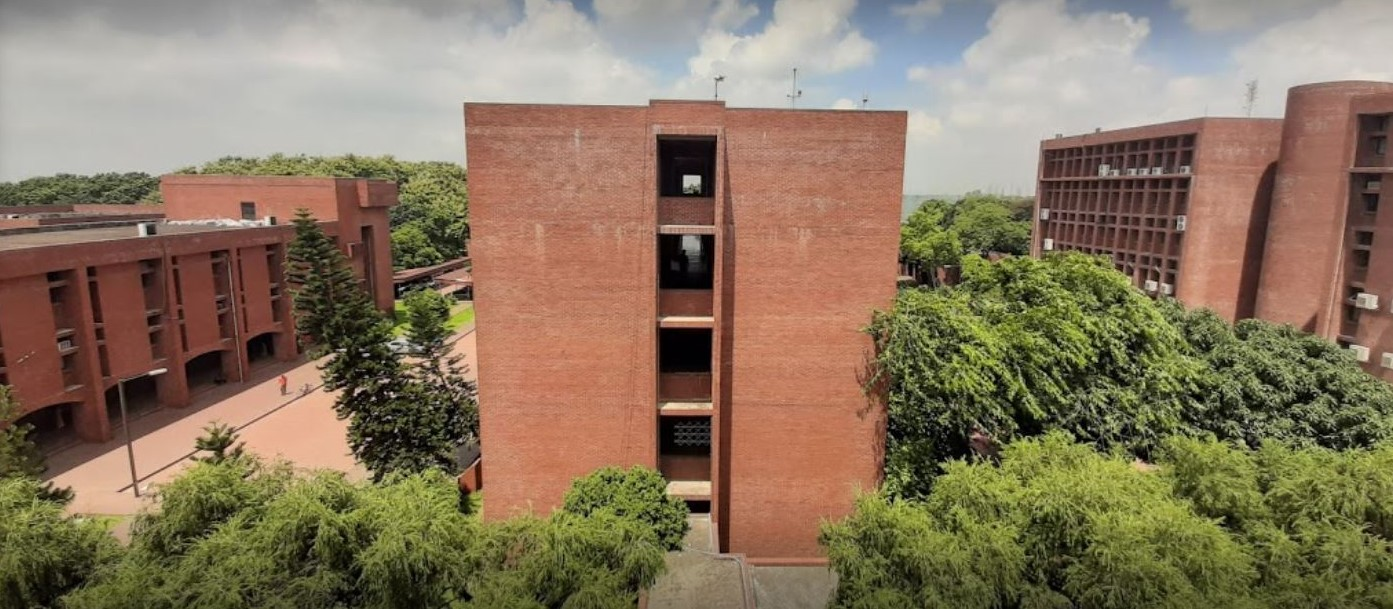
Academic Buildings

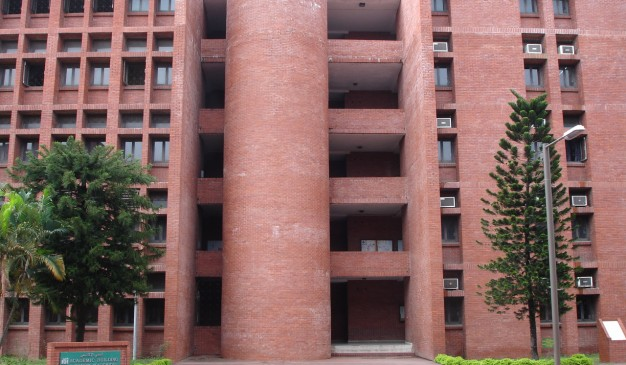
First Academic Building

IUT has three academic buildings and a network of laboratories/workshop buildings.

- First Academic Building
- Second Academic Building
- Third Academic Building

=== Workshop ===
- Southern Workshop
- Middle Workshop
- Northern Workshop

=== Administrative building ===
The administrative building is used for the offices of the vice-chancellor, pro vice-chancellor, registrar, comptroller and other administrative staff.

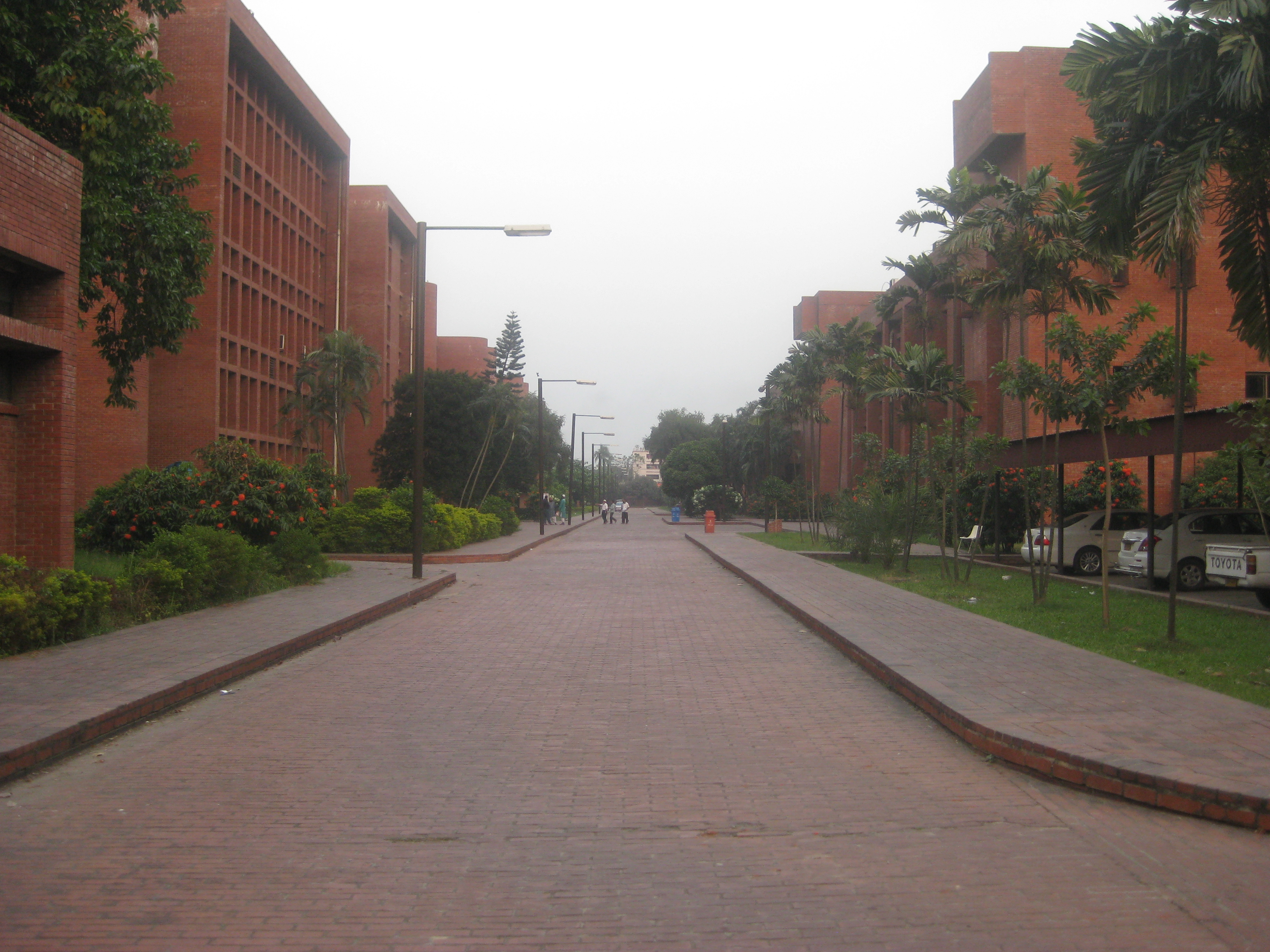
Administrative Building (Right)

=== Library ===
The library is located on the first floor of the Library/Cafeteria building, overlooking the lake on the eastern and western sides. It is divided into two sections: general and research/reference. The library books are on engineering, technical, and vocational subjects. The library subscribes to numerous online and printed technical journals to support research work. An automated library circulation system allows users to borrow books using the bar-code system. The library catalog is available online.

=== Auditorium ===
IUT has an air-conditioned multi-purpose auditorium. The auditorium can accommodate about 600 people. The degree/diploma awarding convocation ceremony, seminars, cultural functions, and examinations are held in the auditorium. The auditorium has a stage, green room, special guest room, and film-projection facilities along with a conference room and balconies along the adjacent lake.

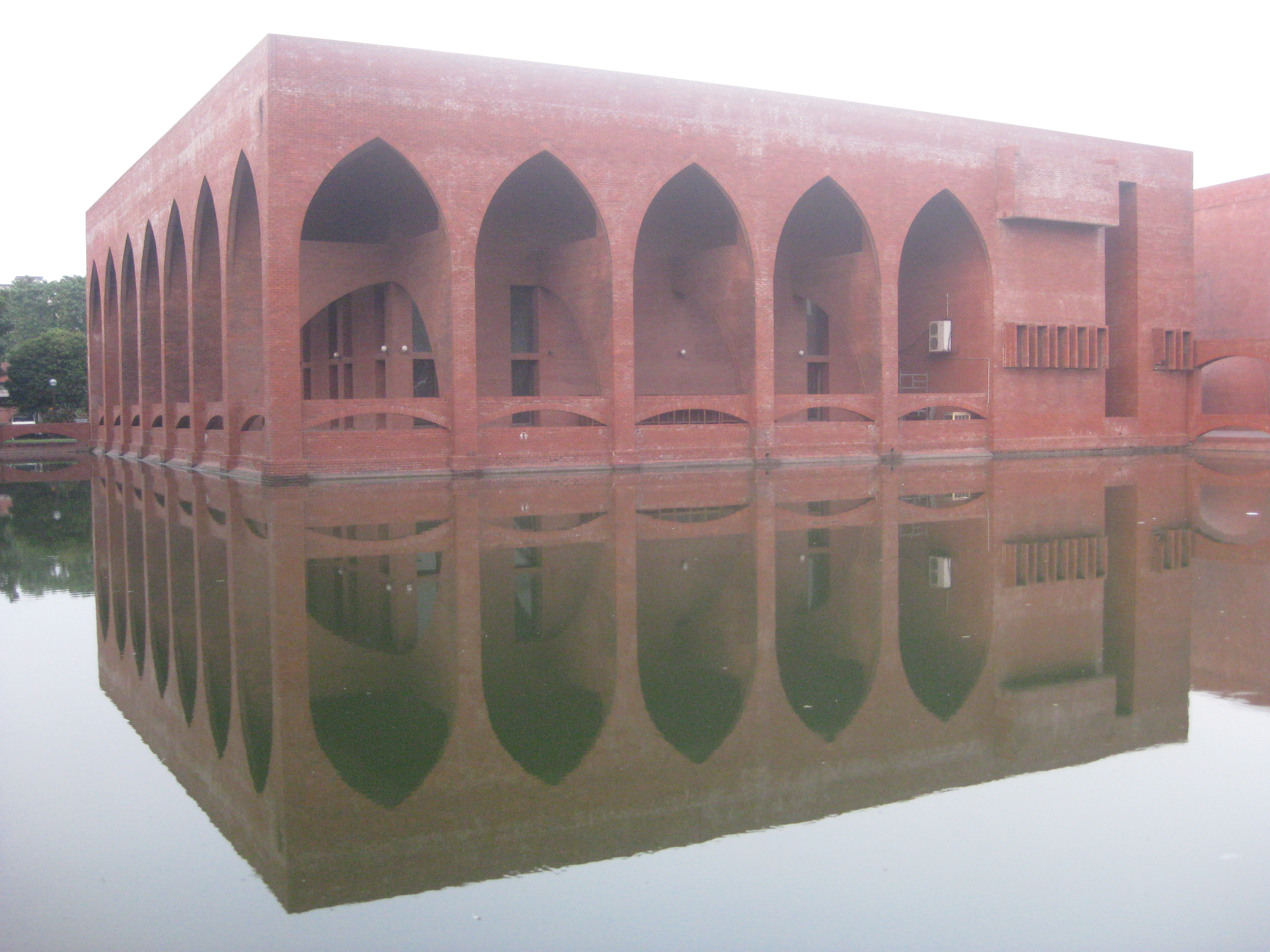
Auditorium

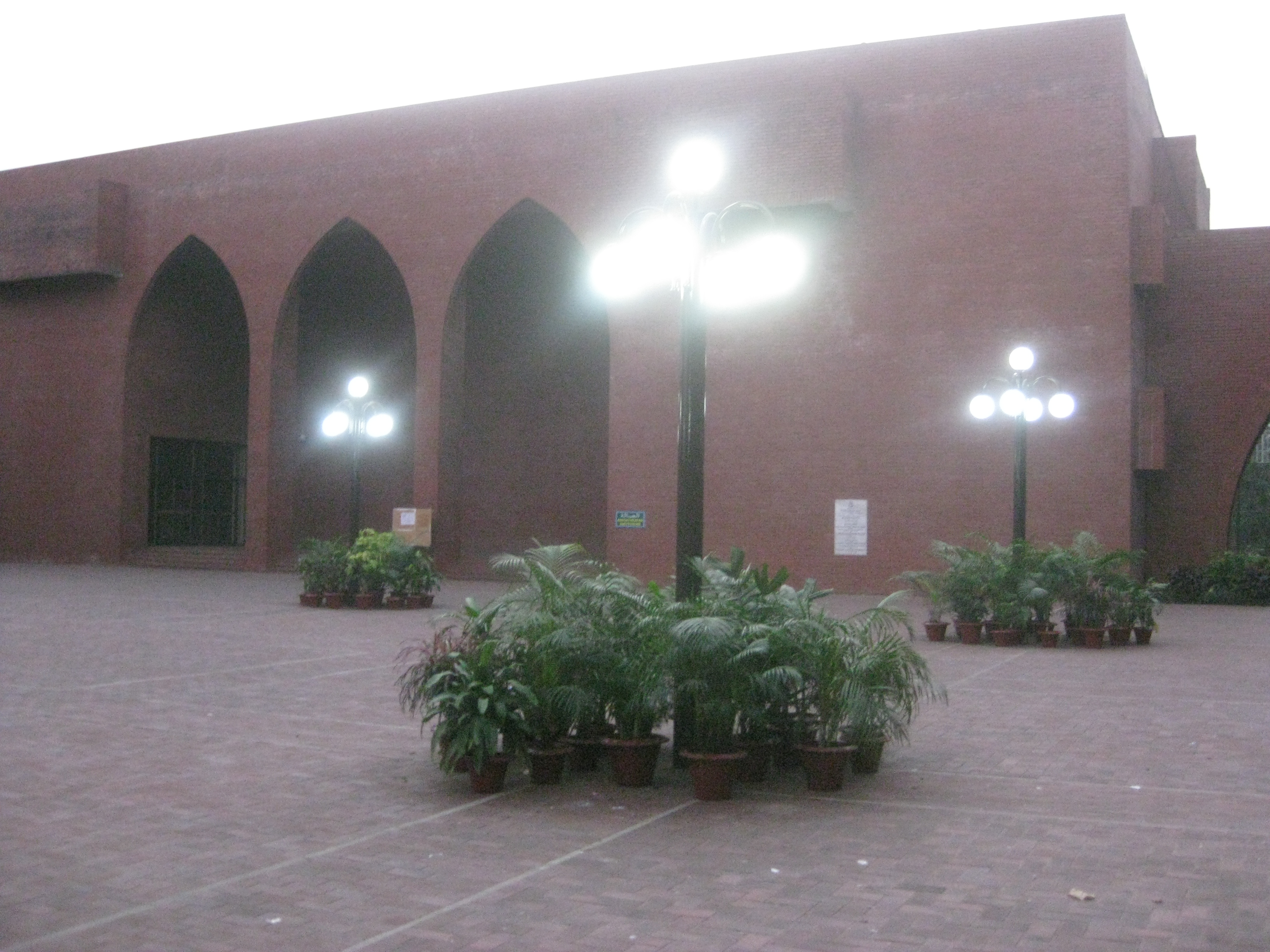
Auditorium Entrance

== Student life ==
=== Student housing ===
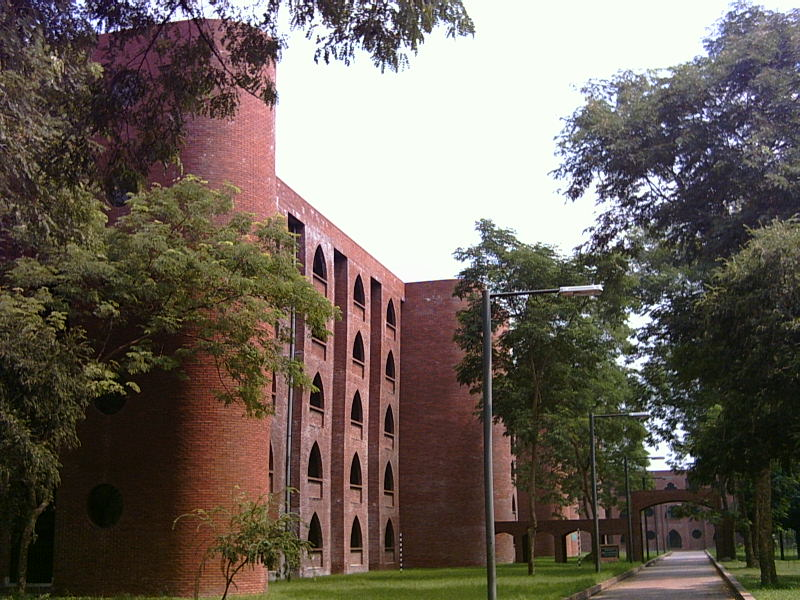
North Hall of Residence

IUT has three halls of residence for on campus accommodation.

- North Hall of Residence
- South Hall of Residence
- Female Hall of Residence

The north hall and the south hall are for male students, while the female hall is for female students. The rooms in the halls are fully furnished. Each room can accommodate up to four students. Two common facilities buildings serve the halls- one serving the north and the south hall, while the other serves the female hall.

The administrative head of a hall of residence is a provost, typically a senior faculty member. The provost is supported by assistant provosts and support staff.

=== Cafeterias ===
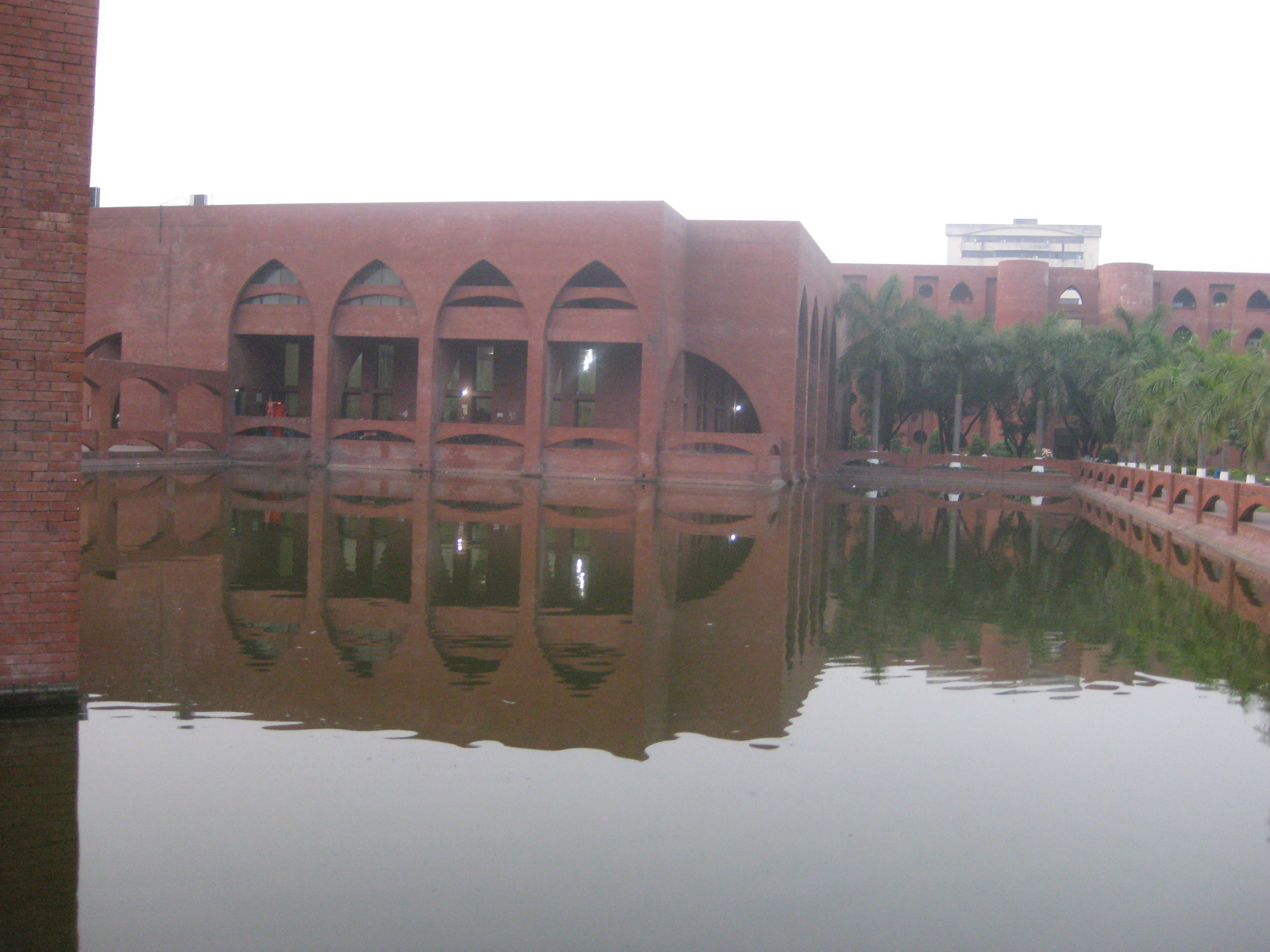
Central Cafeteria

IUT has three self-service cafeterias (Central, North, and Female) where residential students can take their meals. The cafeterias serve breakfast, lunch, evening snacks, and dinner. Non-residential students can purchase meals from the cafeteria using their smart card. The cafeterias are managed by the Cafeteria Committee, composed of faculty members, students, and administrative staff.

=== Mosque ===
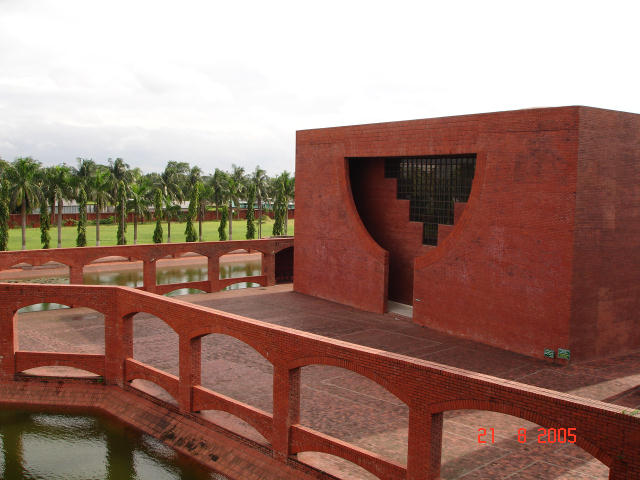
Mosque

There is a mosque right at the heart of the campus. The mosque is two storied and has an adjacent minaret. The mosque is open to the public during the Friday Jumma prayer.

== Athletics ==
The university attaches great importance to co-curricular activities and encourages the students to participate in various games and sports. The Games and Sports Committee, consisting of the student members and a few staff members, looks after the indoor and outdoor games. It also organizes the annual athletic competition.

=== Sports infrastructure ===
==== Student center ====
The university has two student centers with a TV room, a newspaper room, an indoor games room, facilities for board games, chess, and table tennis tables.

==== Gymnasium ====
The university gymnasium is a spacious area with an indoor basketball court and sporting equipment.

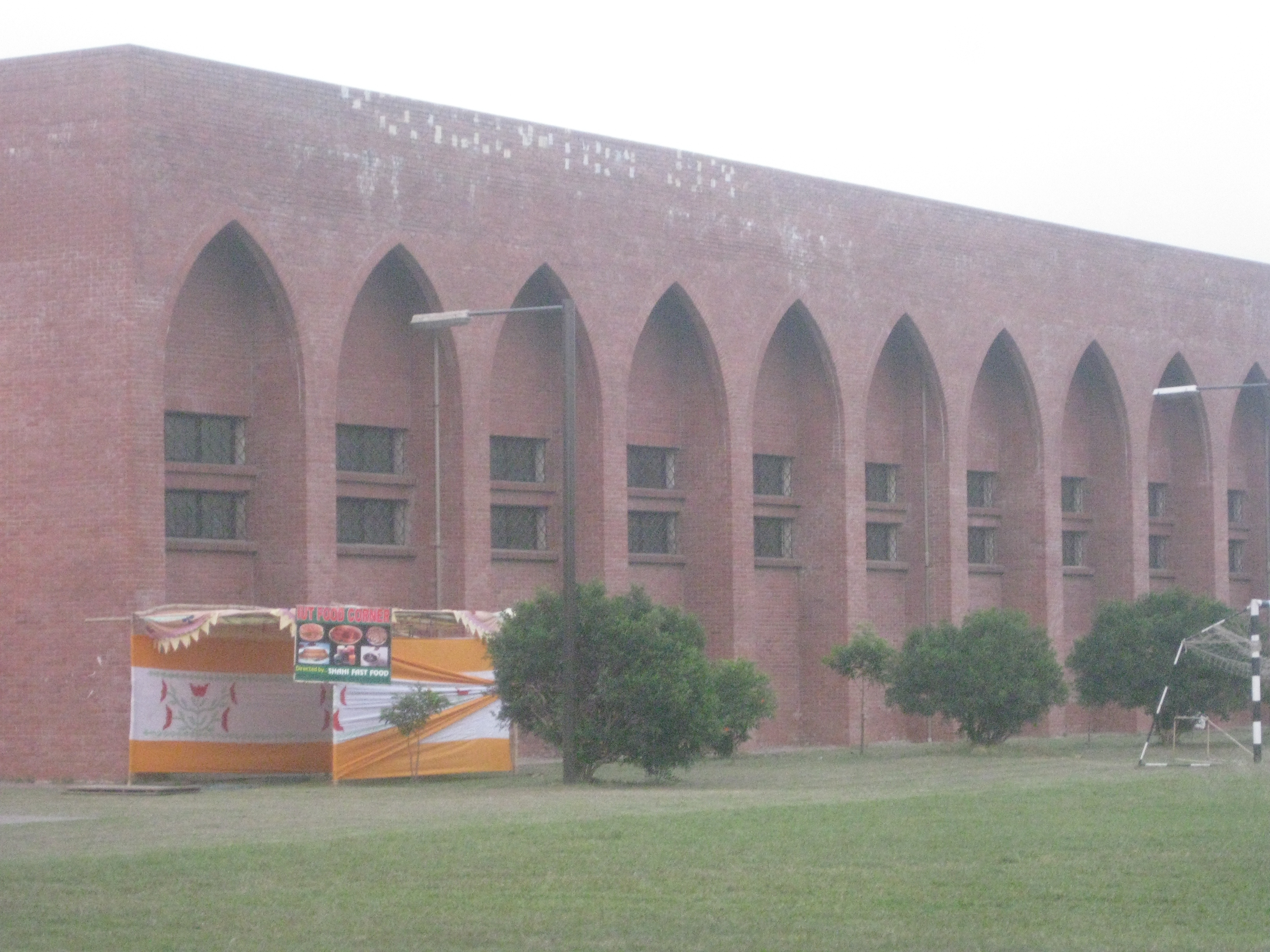
Gymnasium

==== Fitness center ====
The university has a fitness center. This center is equipped with various fitness training equipment, including parallel bars, uneven bars, and weight exercise equipment.

=== Outdoor facilities ===
Outdoor sporting facilities include football grounds, volleyball grounds, basketball courts, a lawn tennis court, a cricket practice pitch, and badminton courts.

== Student organizations ==
=== Student societies ===
==== IUTDS – IUT Debating Society ====
Established in 2002, with the motto 'Debating for Knowledge Dissemination', IUT Debating Society (IUTDS) is a debating club in Bangladesh. IUTDS has had specific achievements both within Bangladesh, by becoming national champions, and internationally, by ranking highly at the World Universities Debating Championship (WUDC). IUTDS has worked to establish a tradition and culture of free speech and exchange of ideas among its members.

==== IUTCS – IUT Computer Society ====
IUT Computer Society (IUTCS) was formed in 2008 by the students of the Department of Computer Science and Information Technology (later renamed to the Department of Computer Science and Engineering). The activities of the society include Programming Classes, Programming Contests, Application Development Classes, Co-curricular Aid and Projects. In addition workshops on current mainstream applications/ technologies as well as seminars with notable personalities and professionals in the ICT sector are a regular part of the calendar events of the IUT Computer Society.

==== IUT CBS – IUT Career and Business Society ====
The Career and Business Society prepares the students for their professional lives by engaging in various career oriented activities like Career Fair and networking events. It creates a platform for the students to develop communication skills and prepare them for professional world through grooming sessions and seminars.

==== IUTPS – IUT Photographic Society ====
Islamic University of Technology Photographic Society (IUTPS) is an on-campus organization aimed to bring together the students who share interest in photography and creativity. Founded in 2010, IUTPS is now a prestigious name among the photography club in the university level. IUTPS arrange classes, organize regular photo walks, and intra photography competition.

==== IUT CADS - IUT CAD Society ====
IUT CAD Society was formed in 2019 with a motto "Design to Dictate" to grow interest in CAD among the students. The society holds weekly tutorial lessons on AutoCAD and SolidWorks for the students. IUTCADS also arranges inter university CAD competition.

==== IUT Model OIC ====
IUT Model OIC was established in 2017 with a vision of providing youth a platform where they can learn more about the OIC and the Muslim world. The club is part of the project of OIC Youth Forum. The motto of IUT MODEL OIC club is "Learners today, Leaders tomorrow". The club helps to improve diplomatic and leadership skills as well as public speaking and critical thinking abilities of the students through various activities.

==== IUT ISC - IUT International Student Community ====
IUT ISC is the oldest student body in the university. The ISC supports international students attending IUT. They organize various cultural programs.

==== IUT SIKS - IUT Society of Islamic Knowledge Seekers ====
The motto of IUT Society of Islamic Knowledge Seekers is "Seeking the true knowledge of Islam". IUTSIKS was established in 2008. Initially it was called IUT Islamic Study Society. In 2016, it was renamed to IUTSIKS.

=== International organization chapters ===
==== IEEE IUT Student Branch ====
Founded in 1963 in the US, The Institute of Electrical and Electronics Engineers (IEEE) is world's largest technical professional organization with over 420,000 members in 160 countries. IEEE IUT Student Branch is a chapter of the Bangladesh Section of IEEE. The branch was founded in 1999 by the students of EEE department.

==== IMechE IUT Student Chapter ====
Founded in 1847 in the UK, Institution of Mechanical Engineers (IMechE) has over 120,000 members in 140 countries. The IMechE IUT Student Chapter was founded by the students of MPE department.

==== ASME IUT Student Section ====
Founded in 1880 as an Engineering society focused on Mechanical Engineering in North America, American Society of Mechanical Engineers (ASME) is now a multidisciplinary global organization with over 110,000 members in more than 150 countries. The ASME IUT Student Section was initiated by the students of MPE department in 2021.

==== ACI IUT Student Chapter ====
Founded in 1904 in USA, the American Concrete Institute (ACI) is a leading authority and resource worldwide for individuals and organizations involved in concrete design, construction, and materials. ACI has over 100 chapters, 200 student chapters, and 30,000 members spanning over 120 countries.
The initiative to start the ACI IUT Student Chapter was taken by students and faculty member of CEE department in April 2020. The Student Chapter started its journey on 4 May 2020.

== Alumni ==
=== IUT Alumni Association (IUTAA) ===
IUT Alumni Association was formed in 2004 by IUT alumni to establish a common platform for social, cultural and professional exchanges among the alumni. IUTAA is run by a thirteen-member executive committee led by the President of the association. The executive committee is elected by the registered graduates through a voting process. The association maintains an office on IUT campus.

=== Notable alumni ===
- Tawfique Hasan, Professor of NanoEngineering at University of Cambridge
- Golam Morshed, Former managing director and CEO of Walton
- Dr. Iqbal Mahmud, Professor and former Dean of the Faculty of Engineering at Mawlana Bhashani Science and Technology University (MBSTU)
- Dr. Mohammad Mehedi Hassan, Professor in the College of Computer and Information Sciences at King Saud University
- Dr. Fahim Kawsar, Director and Research Lead in Pervasive Systems at Nokia Bell Labs (Cambridge, UK) and Visiting Professor at the University of Glasgow
- Dr. Ashfaque Ahmed Chowdhury, Senior academic and engineering researcher at Central Queensland University, Australia

== Festivals and competitions ==
Every year four technology festivals, one business festival and one general competition are organized by six departments of the university. Each departmental festival is organized by the students of the respective department with support from the faculty members. Students from various universities and colleges participate in the competitions of the fests. Competitions are primarily based on engineering, technology, general knowledge and business. The university is open to the public during these festivals.

Technology festivals
Festival	Organizing department
ICT Fest	Dept. of Computer Science & Engineering and IUT Computer Society
ESONANCE	Dept. of Electrical & Electronic Engineering
MECCELERATION	Dept. of Mechanical & Production Engineering
CENNOVATION	Dept. of Civil & Environmental Engineering
Business festivals
Beyond the Metrics	Dept. of Business and Technology Management
General competitions
Skill Innovation Fest	Dept. of Technical and Vocational Education

== See also ==
- List of Islamic educational institutions
- Committee on Scientific and Technological Cooperation, COMSTECH
- List of universities in Bangladesh
- Bangladesh University of Engineering and Technology
- Dhaka University of Engineering & Technology, Gazipur
