= Chittagong University of Engineering & Technology =

Public university in Chattogram, Bangladesh

Chittagong University of Engineering and Technology
- চট্টগ্রাম প্রকৌশল ও প্রযুক্তি বিশ্ববিদ্যালয়
- Other name: CUET
- Former names: Chittagong Engineering College (December 23, 1968-July 1, 1986); Bangladesh Institute of Technology, Chittagong (July 1, 1986-September 1, 2003)
- Motto: A centre of excellence
- Type: Public
- Established: December 23, 1968; 57 years ago
- Accreditation: Institution of Engineers, Bangladesh; Institute of Architects Bangladesh; Bangladesh Institute of Planners
- Affiliations: University Grants Commission
- Chancellor: President Mirza Fakhrul Islam Alamgir
- Vice-Chancellor: Sheikh Shariful Alam
- Academic staff: 455
- Administrative staff: 610+
- Students: 6500+
- Location: Raozan Upazila, Chittagong District, 4349, Bangladesh; 22°27′43.50″N 91°58′22.60″E
- Campus: 171 acres (69 ha); Suburban
- Language: English
- Colors: Navy Blue and Golden Brown
- Website: www.cuet.ac.bd

Residence
- Hall: 9
- Types: Male:6, Female:3

University rankings

Global – Overall
- QS World: 1401+ (2026)
- THE World: 1201-1500 (2026)

Global – Science and engineering
- THE Computer Science: 601-800 (2025)
- THE Engineering: 801-1000 (2025)
- THE Physical Sciences: 601-800 (2025)

Regional – Overall
- QS Asia: 385 (2026)

Chittagong University of Engineering & Technology (Bengali: চট্টগ্রাম প্রকৌশল ও প্রযুক্তি বিশ্ববিদ্যালয়), commonly referred to as CUET, is a public engineering and technological research university located in Raozan in Chittagong District, Bangladesh. Established in 1968 as the Chittagong Engineering College and gained University status in 1986, this university is a state funded institution, maintaining special emphasis on teaching and research of engineering, technology, architecture and planning under five faculties and seventeen academic departments. CUET is one of the five PhD granting engineering research universities of Bangladesh along with BUET, KUET, RUET, and DUET. Number of present students including undergraduate, graduate and post-graduate is around 4,500 with 900 students graduating each year.

== Location ==
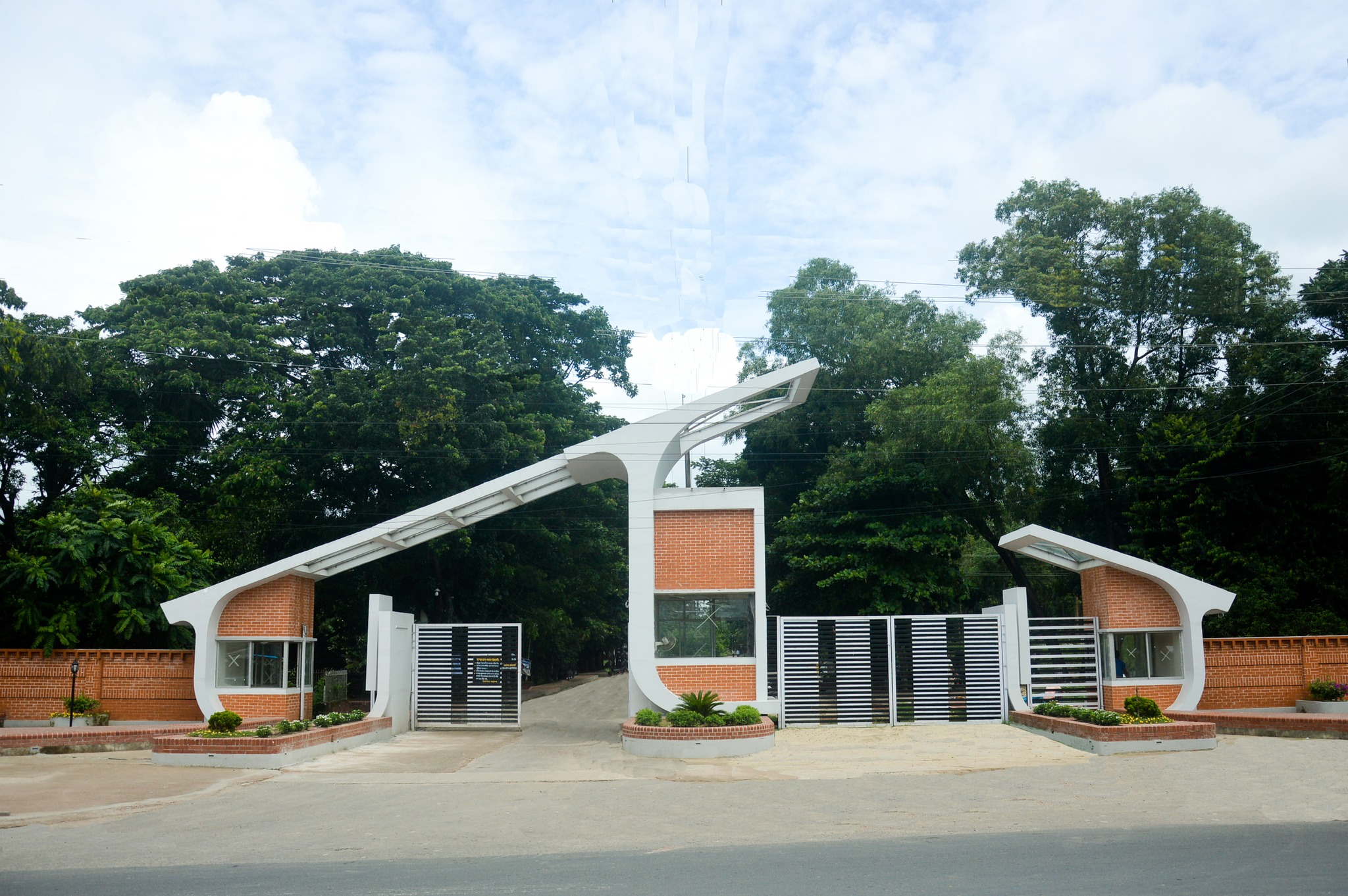
Entrance of CUET

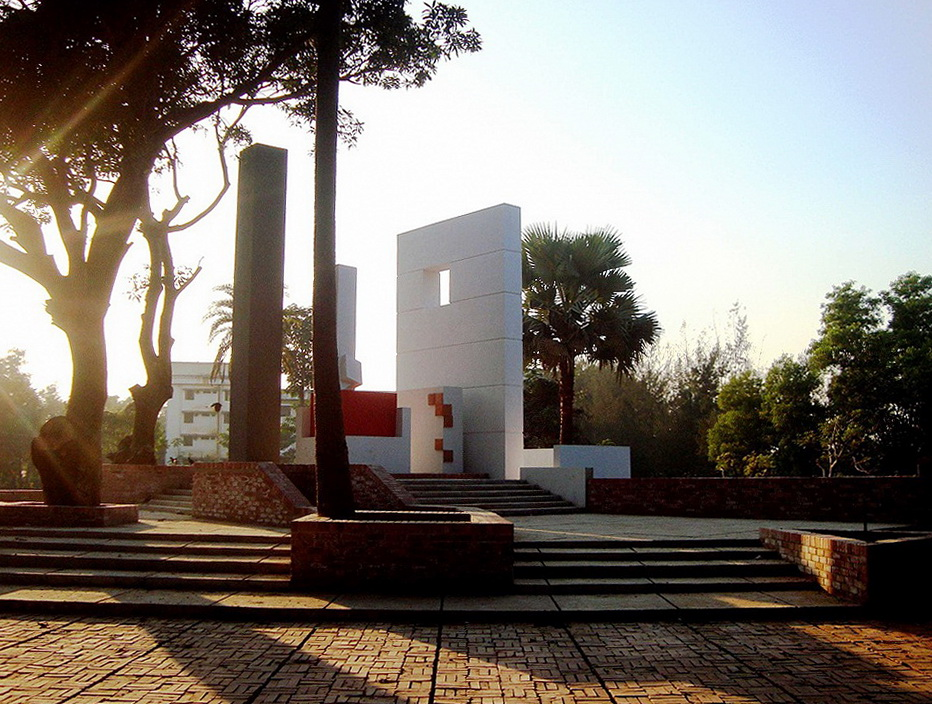
Language Movement Monument

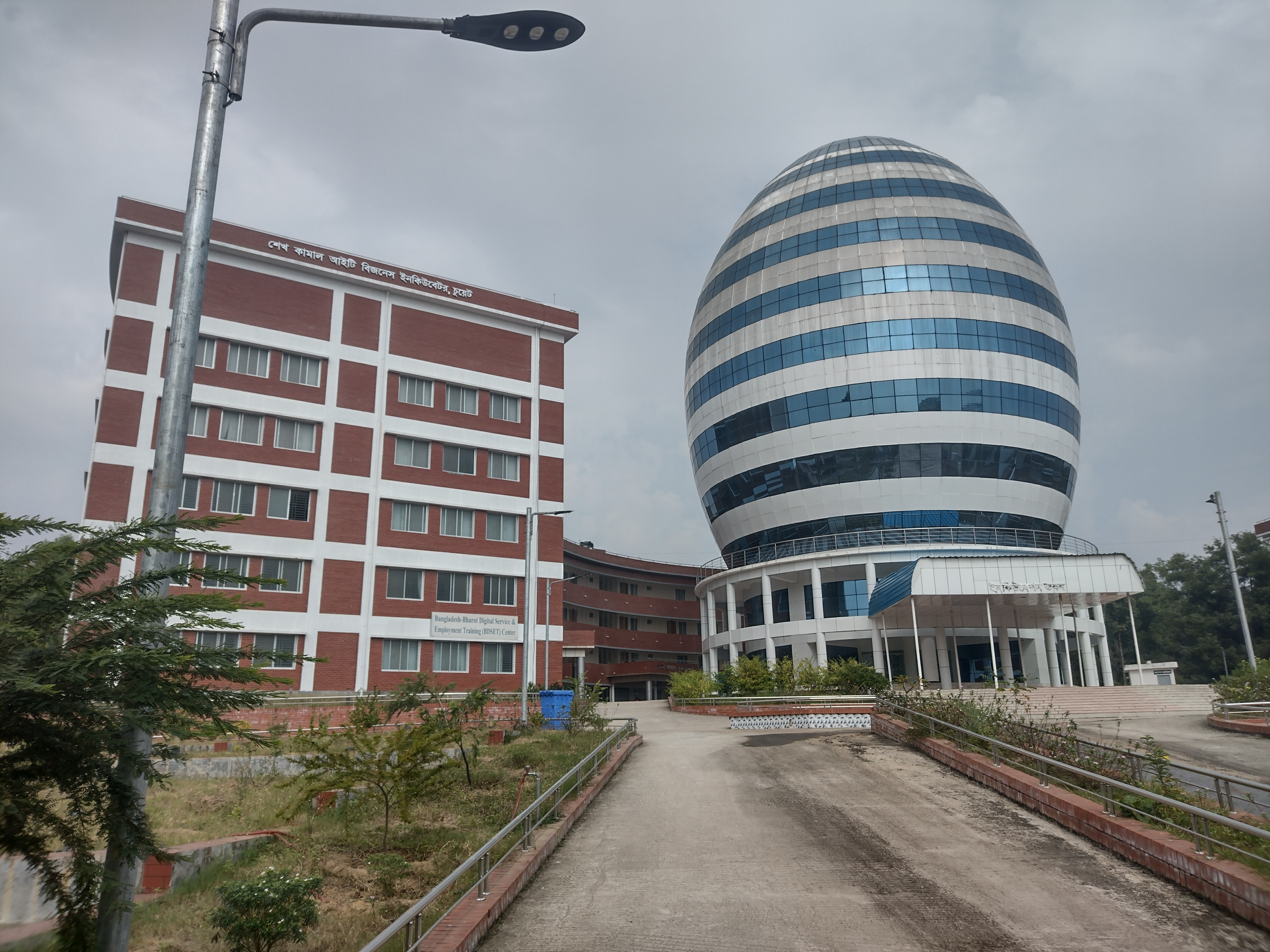
CUET IT Business Incubator

CUET is situated in the Chittagong District under Chittagong Division. It is in the Pahartali union under Raozan upazilla, by the north side of the Chittagong–Kaptai highway about 20 kilometers from the center of Chittagong. The 420 Megawatt Raozan Thermal Power Plant is situated opposite to the campus. Karnaphuli Hydroelectric Power Station, the largest source of hydroelectricity of the country, is situated in Kaptai, about 25 kilometers from CUET.

== History ==
To meet the increasing demand of professional engineers for the national development, the National Economic Council of the Government of Pakistan decided to establish The Engineering College, Chittagong on 28 August 1962. The Engineering College, Chittagong started functioning on 28 December 1968 by admitting 120 students in its first academic session under the faculty of Engineering, University of Chittagong. On 1 July 1986, through a Government Ordinance (No. XXI, 1986) the college was converted into an autonomous institution called Bangladesh Institute of Technology (BIT), Chittagong. There were three other similar BITs in Khulna, Rajshahi and Dhaka. The president of Bangladesh was the visitor of these institutes. A Board of Governors headed by a chairman appointed by the president was the policy-making and administrative authority which had its head office at Tejgaon, Dhaka. Though the BIT, Chittagong was said to be an autonomous institution there was various complexity in the administration, control, budget, admission, development and other processes of the institution. On 1 September 2003, the BIT, Chittagong was converted into a fully autonomous public university and named Chittagong University of Engineering and Technology or CUET for short, after the teachers and students of BIT, Chittagong started huge movement demanding university status for all four BITs. BIT, Khulna; BIT, Rajshahi and BIT, Dhaka had been converted to Khulna University of Engineering and Technology (KUET), Rajshahi University of Engineering and Technology (RUET), and Dhaka University of Engineering and Technology (DUET) respectively at the same time. The first day of September is celebrated as CUET day or University day by the university. The president of Bangladesh was made the chancellor of the University.

At present, the university is a fully autonomous statutory organization of the Government of Bangladesh which awards degrees itself to the graduates. There are various statutory bodies like syndicate, academic council, finance committee, planning, and development committee, academic committees, etc. for policy and decision-making on aspects of the university under the framework of the Act.

== Campus ==
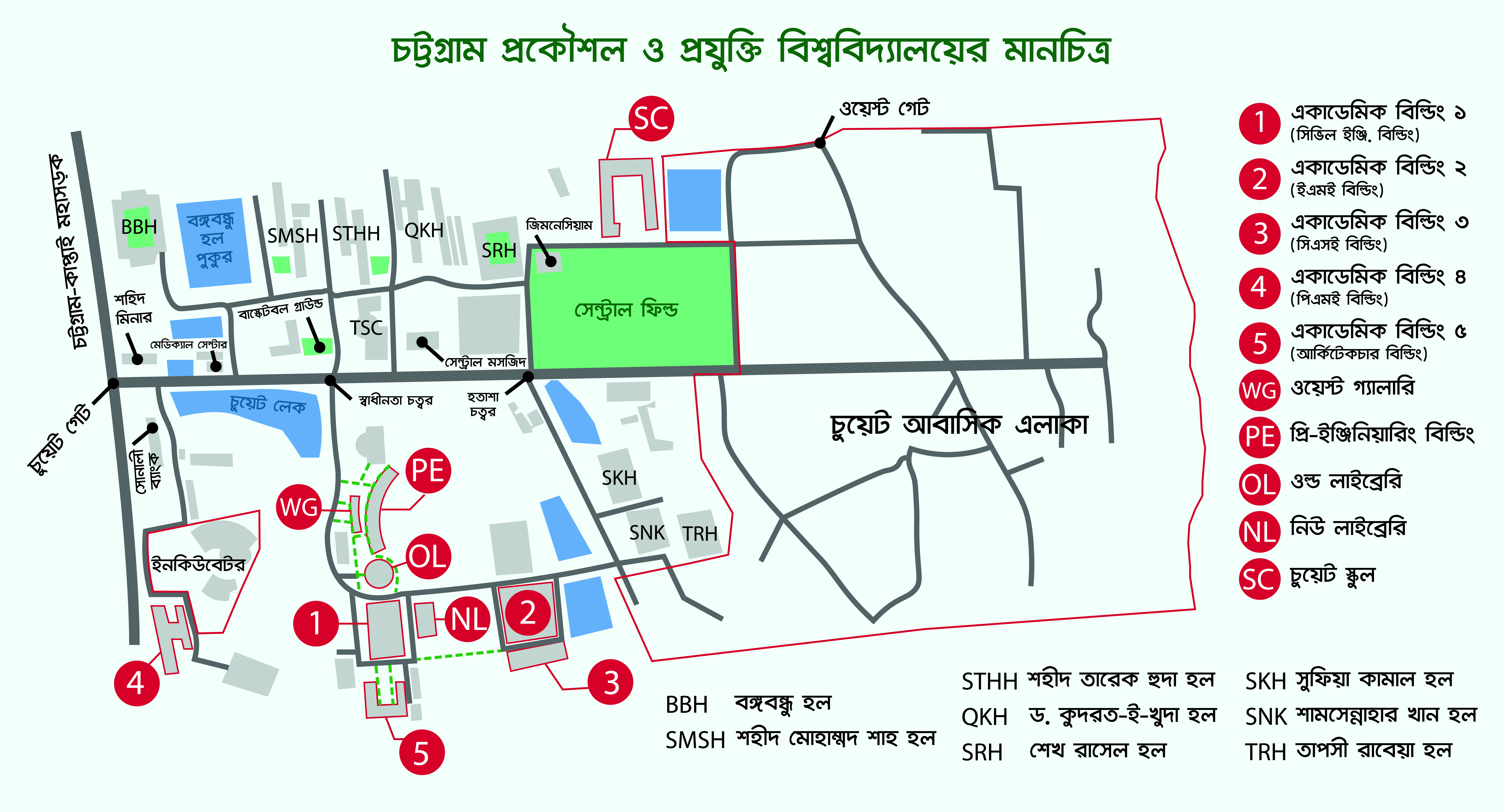
Map of CUET

The university campus covers an area of 188 acres. The campus of CUET is landscaped around a valley with hilly areas and plant varieties making the campus a natural arboretum. Facilities include academic buildings, administration building, auditorium, library, computer center, teachers-students center, ICT Business incubator, workshops, research laboratories, halls of residence, teachers' quarter, canteens and central mosque. The university has inside its boundaries a bank, a post office, three canteens, two galleries for holding conference, a two-storied central mosque having a floor area of 560 square meters, and two mini-mart for general needs.

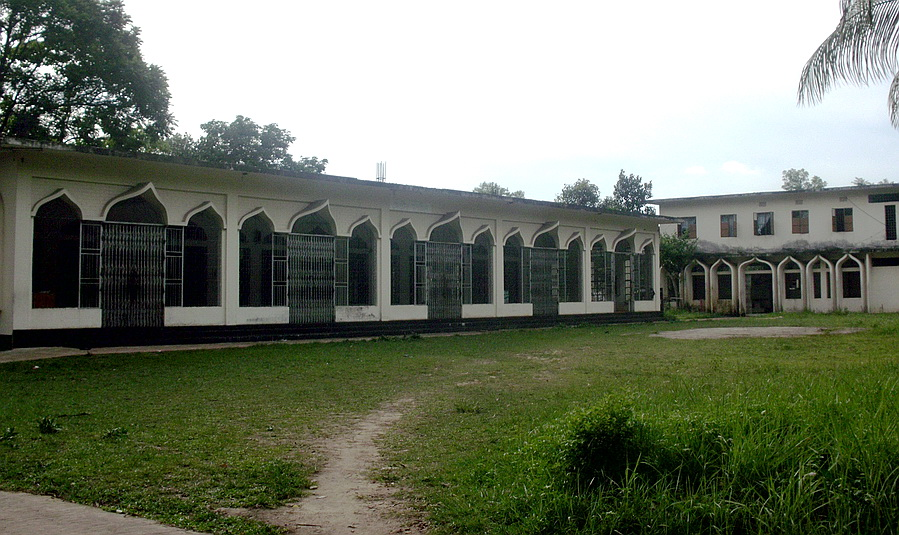
Central Mosque

=== Medical Center ===
The University Medical Center is equipped for primary care, quarantine, sickbed exam appearance, few diagnostics but serious cases are referred to a local hospital 10 kilometers away or to the city hospital. At present, construction of a new building for the medical center is underway.

=== Transportation ===
The university runs its own regular bus service to and from the city for benefit of the students residing there, every office day. Friday and Saturday are weekly holidays. Currently, 11 buses are available for students and staffs of the university.

=== Sports and entertainment ===
The university provides facilities for football, hockey, cricket, volleyball, basketball, table tennis etc. The students play tennis, badminton and other games as well. Sports meets and games competitions are features of campus life. The students arrange debate, cultural show, indoor games competition etc.

=== Library ===
There are two libraries in CUET. Multiple copies of textbooks are available. The library has more than 52,000 books and thousands of journals and periodicals in its collection. The daily newspaper and monthly magazines are also available.

=== Halls of residence ===
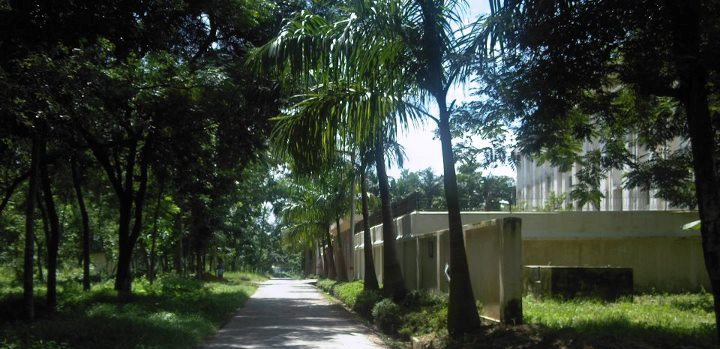
Sufia Kamal Hall

There are 6 men's and 3 women's dormitories.

Halls of residence
Male resident halls
Image	Name of Hall		Year of establishment	No. of resident students
	Dr. Qudrat-E-Khuda Hall	QKH		
	Kabi Kazi Nazrul Islam Hall	KKNIH	2006	
	Muktijoddha Hall	MJH	2025	
	Shaheed Abu Sayeed Hall	SASH		
	Shaheed Mohammad Shah Hall	SMSH		
	Shaheed Tareq Huda Hall	STHH		
Female resident halls
	Sufia Kamal Hall	SKH		
	Shamsennahar Khan Hall	SNK		
	Taposhi Rabeya Hall	TRH		

=== University School and College ===
CUET has a university school and college named Chittagong Engineering University School and College inside its campus, intended to provide secondary and higher secondary education for the children of university staff which also receives general students.

== Administration ==
=== Chancellor ===
- President of Bangladesh

=== Vice-Chancellor ===
- Sheikh Shariful Alam

=== Registrar ===
- Sheikh Muhammad Humayun Kabir (Additional Charge)

== List of vice-chancellors ==
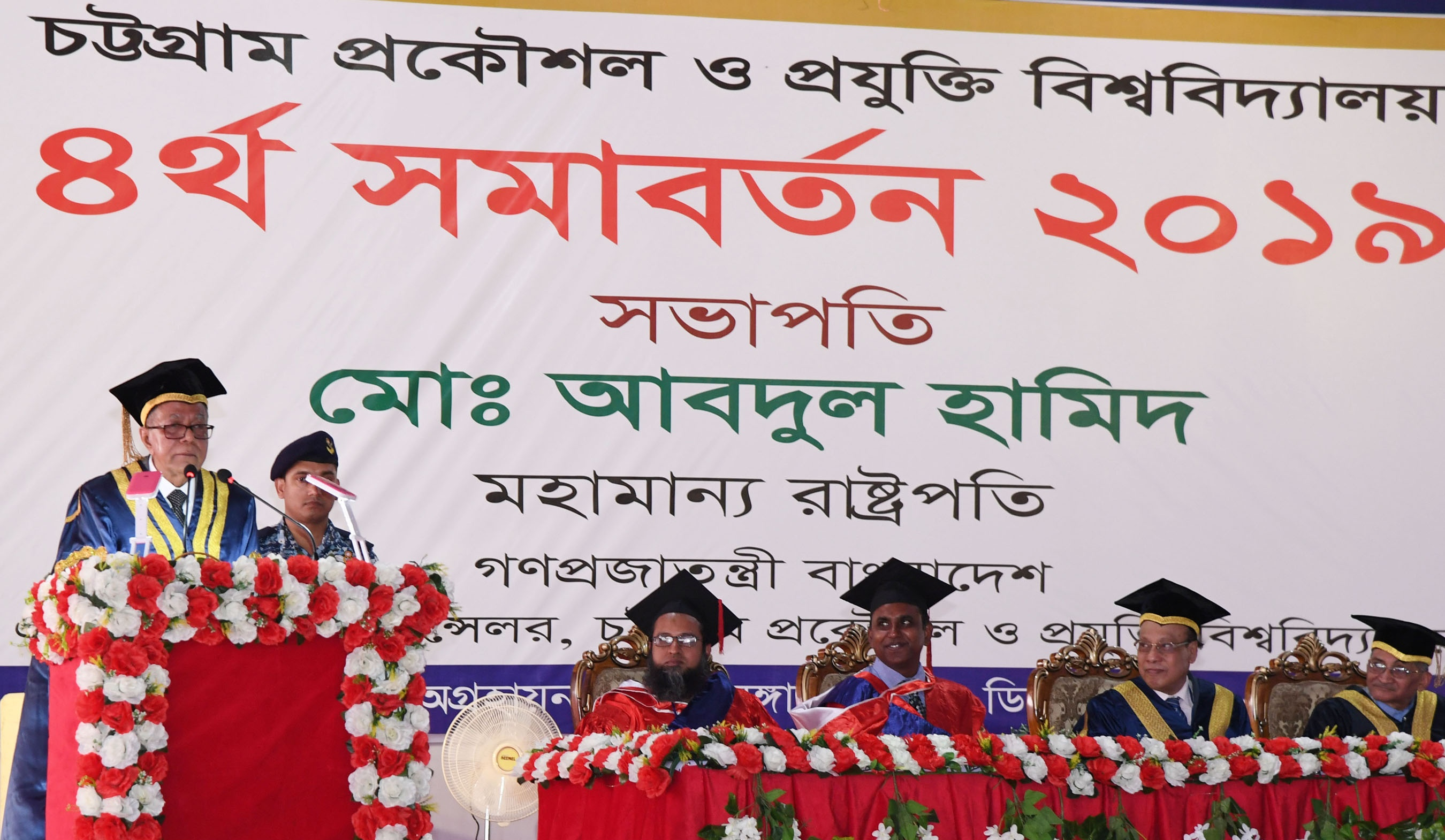
Former President and Chancellor of the university, Mohammad Abdul Hamid, delivering a speech at the 4th Convocation.

1. Sheikh Shariful Alam
2. Abu Shadat Muhammad Sayem
3. Mahmud Abdul Matin Bhuiyan
4. Mohammad Rafiqul Alam
5. Md. Jahangir Alam
6. Shyamol Kanti Biswas
7. Mir Shahidul Islam
8. Mohammad Mozammel Haque

== Academics ==
=== Academic programs ===
The university offers degrees in engineering disciplines in undergraduate and post-graduate levels and also conducts research and provides degrees in basic sciences in post-graduate level.

Name of Faculties	Departments	Abbrev.	Undergraduate	Graduate	Postgraduate
Faculty of Electrical & Computer Engineering	Electrical and Electronic Engineering	EEE	check	check	check
Faculty of Electrical & Computer Engineering	Computer Science and Engineering	CSE	check	check	check
Faculty of Electrical & Computer Engineering	Electronic & Telecommunication Engineering	ETE	check	check	check
Faculty of Electrical & Computer Engineering	Biomedical engineering	BME	check		
Faculty of Civil and Environment Engineering	Civil Engineering	CE	check	check	check
Faculty of Civil and Environment Engineering	Water Resources Engineering	WRE	check		
Faculty of Civil and Environment Engineering	Disaster Engineering & Management	DEM		check	check
Faculty of Mechanical and Manufacturing Engineering	Mechanical Engineering	ME	check	check	check
Faculty of Mechanical and Manufacturing Engineering	Petroleum & Mining Engineering	PME	check		
Faculty of Mechanical and Manufacturing Engineering	Mechatronics and Industrial Engineering	MIE	check		
Faculty of Mechanical and Manufacturing Engineering	Materials and Metallurgical Engineering	MME	check		
Faculty of Architecture & Planning	Architecture	ARCH	check		
Faculty of Architecture & Planning	Urban & Regional Planning	URP	check		
Faculty of Architecture & Planning	Humanities	HUM			
Faculty of Science & Technology	Physics	PHY		check	check
Faculty of Science & Technology	Mathematics	MATH		check	check
Faculty of Science & Technology	Chemistry	CHEM		check	check
Faculty of Science & Technology	Nuclear Engineering	NE		check	

=== Institutes and centers ===
Institutes		Centers	
Name of Institutes	Abbrev.	Name of Centers	Abbrev.
Institute of Information and Communication Technology	IICT	Center for River, Harbor and Landslide Research	CRHLSR
Institution of Energy Technology	IET	Center for Industrial Problems Research	CIPR
Directorate of Research and Extension	DRE	Center for Environmental Science and Engineering Research	CESER
Institute of Earthquake Engineering Research	IEER	Language Center	LC
Sheikh Kamal IT Business Incubator	Incubator	Bureau of Research, Testing and Consultation	BRTC

=== Rankings ===
Chittagong University of Engineering and Technology (CUET) ranks between #1001-1200 in Times Higher Education (THE) World University Rankings 2025. Also, it ranks #1201-1400 in the Quacquarelli Symonds (QS) World University Rankings 2025 and between #101-150 for QS WUR by subject. It holds a position of #125 in the Southern Asia rankings and falls within the #451-500 range in the overall Asian university rankings.

=== Research and publication ===
The university has a motto to make itself as 'A center of excellence'. For promoting research, the university established a distinct institute namely 'Research and Extension'. International Conferences organized by CUET: International Conference on Advances in Civil Engineering (ICACE) organized by Department of Civil Engineering, CUET International Conference on Mechanical Engineering and Renewable Energy (ICMERE) organized by Department of Mechanical Engineering, CUET International Conference on Electrical, Computer and Communication Engineering (ECCE) organized by faculty of Electrical and Computer Engineering (ECE)

=== Calendar ===
After the publication of admission test result, selected students are admitted in Level-1 (academic year). Each Level is divided into three terms. Term-I and Term-II are composed of 18 weeks and Short Term composed of 3 weeks. Each week consists of five working days. A student can register for the next Level after completion of all three Terms. A Bachelor course in Engineering consists of four Levels and a Bachelor of Architecture course consists of five Levels. A Term final examination is held at the end of Term-I and II besides class tests examination for continuous assessment of progress.

Students can clear any backlog or incomplete courses in the Short Term exam. At least 155 credit hours must be earned to be eligible for a bachelor's degree in engineering. The candidate is awarded Honors if he/she obtains CGPA above 3.75 or higher and awarded Chancellor's award if CGPA is 4.0.

=== Medium of instruction ===
The language of instruction is English, which is the official language for examinations.

== Admissions and costs ==
=== Admissions ===
The Undergraduate admission test is one of the most intensive written examinations in Bangladesh. After completion of higher secondary education or A level, a student can submit her or his application for undergraduate admission if he/she fulfills the minimum requirements. According to the admission process till 2019, students with the best grades in Mathematics, Physics, and Chemistry of their higher secondary examination were allowed to sit in the admission test. The screening process used to allow 10,000 students to sit for the admission test, based on the cumulative sum of grade points in these four subjects. Students had to sit only for the written test in admission. They had to seat for an additional free-hand drawing test in order to get admitted in architecture. After the admission test, only about 890 students got admitted. From 2020, three public engineering universities in Bangladesh, CUET along with KUET and RUET took a combined admission test to select students for all three of them. Around 30,000 students competed in the admission test for 3201 seats in three universities combined.

For admission to Masters and Postgraduate programs, candidates are required to appear in interviews and/or written tests.

=== Expenses ===
For international students, $500 is to be paid per semester as registration fees. The university also provides scholarship on the basis of their merit.

== IT Business Incubator, CUET ==
The Bangladesh Hi-Tech Park Authority (BHTPA) established an ICT business incubator inside Chittagong University of Engineering and Technology. 25 acres of land was provided to the Ministry of Posts, Telecommunications and Information Technology and BHTPA inside the university campus by CUET authority. The project was approved by the economic department of BHTPA on 8 November 2012.

The IT incubator was inaugurated on 6 July 2022 by Prime Minister Sheikh Hasina.

The IT Business Incubator war formerly known as Sheikh Kamal IT Business Incubator. Recently, Bangladesh Hi-Tech Park Authority changed the name.

== See also ==
- Bangladesh University of Engineering and Technology
- Bangladesh University of Textiles
- University of Dhaka
- Khulna University of Engineering & Technology
- Rajshahi University of Engineering & Technology
- Dhaka University of Engineering & Technology
- List of Universities in Bangladesh
- Debjani Ghosh
- Ayub Chowdhury
