= Mohd. Rafiqul Alam Beg =

Bangladeshi academic

- মোহম্মদ রফীকুল আলম বেগ

Vice-chancellor of Rajshahi University of Engineering and Technology
- In office 28 May 2014 – 29 July 2018
- Succeeded by: Md. Rafiqul Islam Sheikh

Personal details
- Born: 7 January 1959 (age 67)
- Education: University of Rajshahi; Bangladesh University of Engineering and Technology; Jadavpur University

Mohd. Rafiqul Alam Beg (Bengali: মোহম্মদ রফীকুল আলম বেগ; born 7 January 1959) is a Bangladeshi professor of mechanical engineering and academic administrator. He served as the vice-chancellor of Rajshahi University of Engineering and Technology (RUET) from 2014 to 2018.

== Early life and education ==
Beg completed his B.Sc. Engineering from the University of Rajshahi in 1979. He later earned an M.Sc.Eng. from the Bangladesh University of Engineering and Technology (BUET) in 1987, and a Ph.D. from Jadavpur University, Kolkata, in 1997.

== Academic career ==
Beg joined the University of Rajshahi as a lecturer in 1984. He continued his academic career through institutional transitions when the engineering colleges under the university were reorganized into the Bangladesh Institute of Technology (BIT) in 1986 and later upgraded to RUET in 2003.

At RUET, he served:

- Four terms as Head of the Department of Mechanical Engineering
- Dean of the Faculty of Mechanical Engineering (2008–2010)

== Research ==
Beg’s research focuses on internal combustion engines, particularly:

- Combustion behavior
- Emission and pollution control
- Use of alternative fuels
- Ceramic-coated diesel engine technology

== Vice-chancellorship ==
Beg was appointed vice-chancellor of RUET on 28 May 2014 for a four-year term.

During his tenure, RUET experienced a major student protest in early 2017 regarding the introduction of the “33 credit system”. The policy required students to complete a minimum of 33 credits per academic year to avoid repeating the year.

Students began boycotting classes on 28 January 2017, and on 4 February, Beg and several faculty members were confined by protesting students.

Following negotiations, the academic council decided to withdraw the policy, after which the vice-chancellor was released and students resumed classes.

Subsequently, the RUET Teachers Association called a strike protesting the treatment of faculty members, which continued for nearly two weeks.
