= Rajshahi University of Engineering & Technology =

Public engineering university in Rajshahi, Bangladesh

- রাজশাহী প্রকৌশল ও প্রযুক্তি বিশ্ববিদ্যালয়
- Crest of RUET
- Other name: RUET
- Former names: Rajshahi Engineering College (1964–1986), Bangladesh Institute of Technology (BIT), Rajshahi (1986–2003)
- Motto: ঐশী জ্যোতিই আমাদের পথ প্রদর্শক
- Motto in English: Heaven's Light is Our Guide
- Type: Public Engineering Research University
- Established: 1964; 62 years ago
- Accreditation: IEB; IAB; IEEE; IAU; ACU; BIP; APSIA
- Affiliations: University Grants Commission (UGC)
- Budget: ৳100.17 crore (US$8.2 million) (2024-2025)
- Chancellor: President Mirza Fakhrul Islam Alamgir
- Vice-Chancellor: S. M. Abdur Razzak
- Academic staff: 430
- Administrative staff: 525
- Students: 7409
- Undergraduates: 6150
- Postgraduates: 1,053
- Doctoral students: 206
- Location: 6204 Rajshahi – Dhaka Highway, Rajshahi, Rajshahi, Bangladesh; 24.3635°N 88.6280°E
- Campus: Urban, 152 acres (0.615 km²)
- Language: English
- Colors: Navy Blue, Golden Yollow and Green
- Nickname: RUETian
- Website: www.ruet.ac.bd
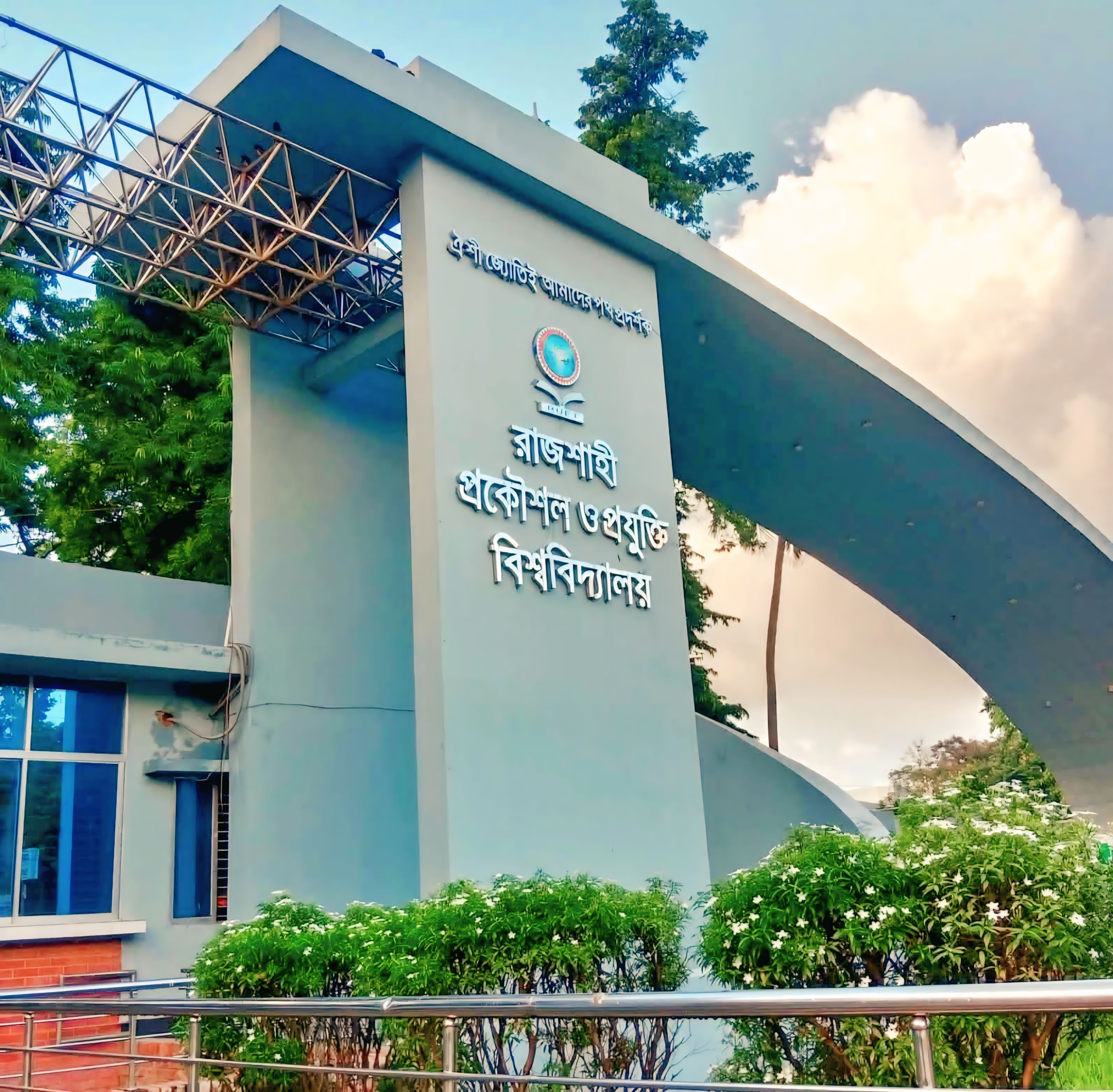

University rankings

Global – Overall
- QS World: 1401+ (2026)
- THE World: 1201-1500 (2025)

Global – Science and engineering
- THE Computer Science: 801-1000 (2025)
- THE Engineering: 801-1000 (2025)
- THE Physical Sciences: 601-800 (2025)

Regional – Overall
- QS Asia: 470 (2026)
- THE Asia: 501-600 (2025)

Rajshahi University of Engineering & Technology, commonly known by the acronym RUET, is a PhD granting, 2nd oldest public engineering and technological research university in Bangladesh. It specialises in the fields of applied sciences, engineering, technology, architecture, and urban planning. RUET is one of the five PhD granting engineering research universities of Bangladesh along with BUET, KUET, CUET, and DUET.

== History ==
=== Establishment (1964–1971) ===
Before the independence of Bangladesh, the Government of East Pakistan established Rajshahi Engineering College (REC) in 1964 as a faculty of engineering under the University of Rajshahi. It was the second engineering college in then East Pakistan and was founded to meet the growing demand for professional engineers.

The college began its academic activities with three departments: Mechanical Engineering, Electrical & Electronic Engineering, and Civil Engineering. The first batch of approximately 120 students was admitted in the 1964–65 academic session, and the institution initially had 19 faculty members.

=== Post-independence restructuring (1971–1986) ===
After the Bangladesh Liberation War in 1971, the administrative structure of the college became complex, with different authorities controlling administration, academics, and infrastructure. To resolve these issues, several committees and commissions were formed from 1973 onward.

Based on their recommendations, in 1986 the college was restructured as the Bangladesh Institute of Technology (BIT), Rajshahi, aiming to improve technical education and administrative efficiency.

=== University status (2003) ===
In September 2003, BIT Rajshahi was upgraded to a full-fledged public university and renamed Rajshahi University of Engineering & Technology (RUET). This transformation was carried out under the "Rajshahi University of Engineering & Technology Act, 2003", granting the institution full academic and administrative autonomy.

=== Expansion and modern development (2003–present) ===
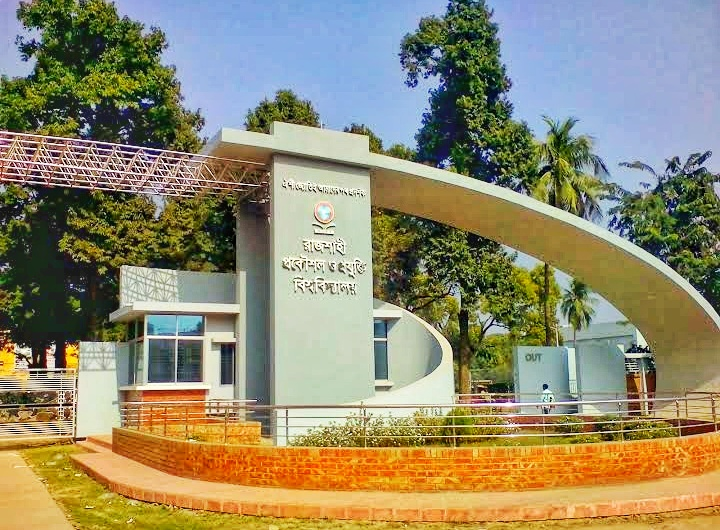
RUET campus main gate

Following its upgrade, the university expanded its academic programs and infrastructure. The Architecture department was established in 2013, marking an important addition to design-oriented and interdisciplinary education.

In subsequent years, RUET introduced additional modern and interdisciplinary disciplines such as Mechatronics engineering, Materials science, and Urban and regional planning, reflecting the evolving demands of engineering education and industry.

Currently, the university comprises 14 departments under several faculties and offers undergraduate and postgraduate programs. Each year, several hundred students are admitted through a competitive admission process, with thousands of students enrolled across different levels.

At the graduate level, programs such as M.Sc. Engg., M. Engg., M.Phil, and PhD are offered. The university also enrolls international students, and the medium of instruction is English.

== Campus ==
Rajshahi University of Engineering and Technology (RUET) is situated in the northern part of Bangladesh, in the city of Rajshahi—the educational center of North Bengal. The campus has been described as representing a "spectacular harmony of architecture and natural beauty".

The present campus covers approximately 152 acres and includes academic buildings, laboratories, workshops, residential halls, faculty housing, administrative offices, and recreational facilities.

=== Historical development of the campus ===
RUET originated as Rajshahi Engineering College in 1964 under the University of Rajshahi. During its early years, the campus infrastructure was limited, consisting of a few academic buildings and basic residential facilities.

After the independence of Bangladesh in 1971, gradual expansion of the campus began with the construction of new academic buildings, laboratories, and student halls. In 1986, when the institution was upgraded to Bangladesh Institute of Technology (BIT), Rajshahi, further infrastructural development took place, including workshops and modern laboratory facilities.

Following its transformation into a full-fledged university in 2003, the campus underwent significant modernization and expansion. New departments, research laboratories, residential halls, and support facilities were established, shaping the present RUET campus into a comprehensive engineering education hub.

=== Library ===
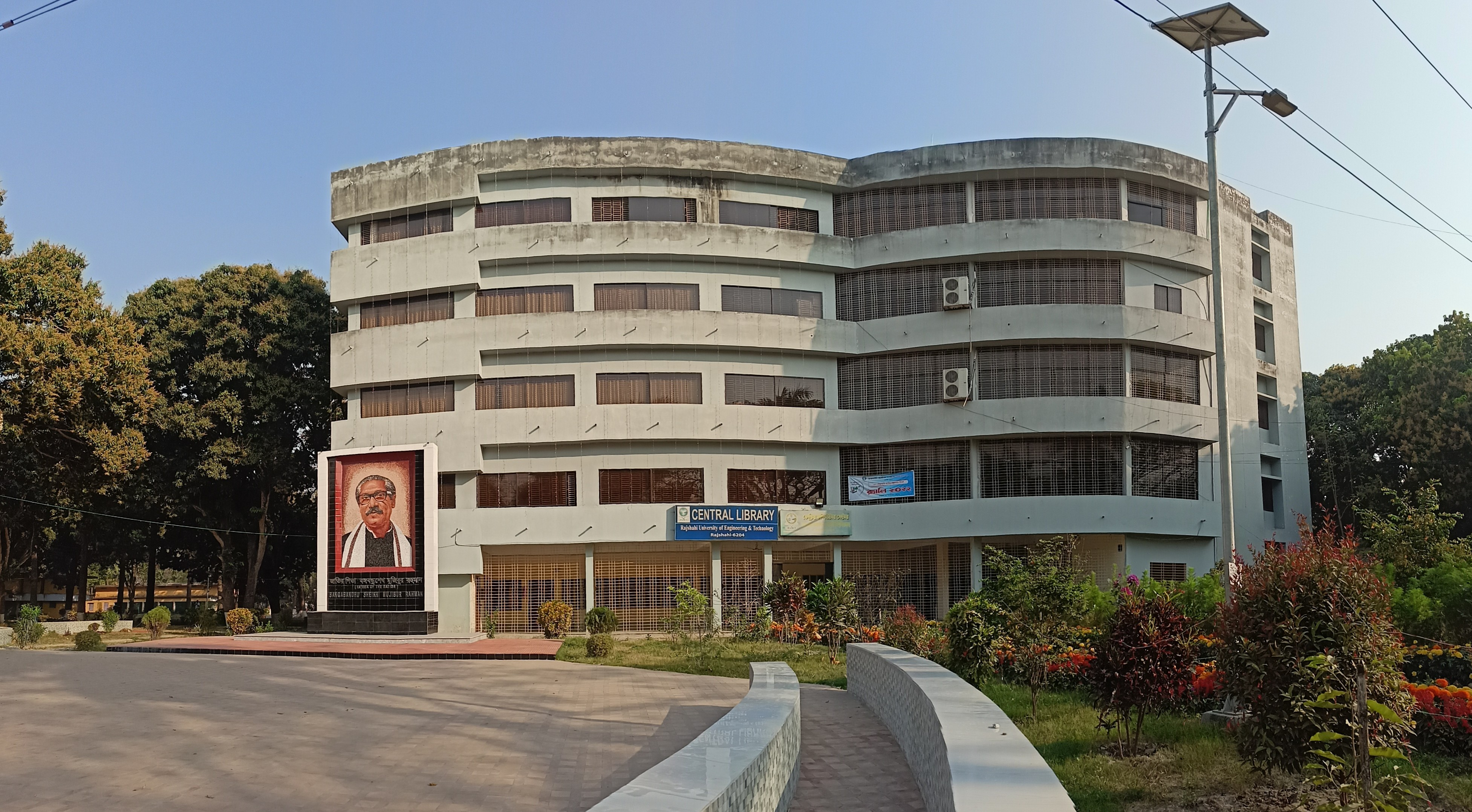
Central library of RUET

The Central Library of Rajshahi University of Engineering and Technology (RUET) serves as the primary academic library of the university and supports teaching, learning, and research activities across different disciplines.

The library houses collections related to engineering, science, architecture, urban planning, and technology. Its holdings include textbooks, reference books, journals, newspapers, theses, dissertations, and digital resources.

RUET Central Library uses the KOHA Integrated Library System (ILS) for cataloguing and circulation services. Students and faculty members can access the online public access catalogue (OPAC) to search for books and other materials.

The library also provides access to several online databases and academic platforms, including:

- IEEE Xplore
- ACM Digital Library
- JSTOR
- SpringerLink
- Taylor & Francis Online
- Oxford Scholarship Online
- UGC Digital Library (UDL)
- BAS-LiCoB consortium resources

The central reading room has seating facilities for around 150 students, along with a separate reading space for faculty members. The library is equipped with Wi-Fi connectivity, internet facilities, and digital search services for academic use.

In addition to the central library, departmental seminar libraries and hall libraries operate in various academic departments and residential halls of the university.

== List of vice-chancellors and earlier heads ==
The following table lists all heads of Rajshahi University of Engineering and Technology (RUET) from its establishment in 1964 as Rajshahi Engineering College (REC), through Bangladesh Institute of Technology (BIT), Rajshahi, to its present status as a university.

| No. | Name | Designation | Term of office |
Rajshahi Engineering College (REC) – Principals (1964–1986)
| 1 | Abul Mohsin Ahmed | Principal | 17 August 1964 – 1 December 1967 |
| 2 | Kazi Harun-Or-Rashid | Principal | 1 December 1967 – 1 March 1968 |
| 3 | Md. Kabir Uddin | Principal | 1 March 1968 – 1 August 1970 |
| 4 | Md. Rais Uddin Ahmed | Principal | 2 August 1970 – 20 September 1971 |
| 5 | Wahid Uddin Ahmed | Principal | 24 September 1971 – 12 November 1972 |
| 6 | Abul Kalam Azad | Principal | 13 November 1972 – 10 March 1973 |
| 7 | Md. Rais Uddin Ahmed | Principal | 11 March 1973 – 8 March 1977 |
| 8 | K. M. Waliuzzaman | Principal | 9 March 1977 – 6 July 1978 |
| 9 | A. H. M. Haider Azam | Principal | 7 July 1978 – 6 February 1980 |
| 10 | Kazi Harun-Or-Rashid | Principal | 6 February 1980 – 18 December 1981 |
| 11 | G. M. Habibullah | Principal | 18 December 1981 – 28 February 1983 |
| 12 | K. M. Waliuzzaman | Principal | 1 March 1983 – 30 June 1986 |
Bangladesh Institute of Technology (BIT), Rajshahi – Directors (1986–2003)
| 13 | K. M. Waliuzzaman | Director | 1 July 1986 – 4 March 1987 |
| 14 | G. M. Habibullah | Director | 5 March 1987 – 12 March 1989 |
| 15 | K. M. Waliuzzaman | Director | 13 March 1989 – 24 July 1991 |
| 16 | Md. Matlab Ali Khan | Director | 21 January 1992 – 3 September 1993 |
| 17 | A. M. Rezaul Karim Talukder | Director | 4 September 1993 – 3 July 1996 |
| 18 | G. M. Habibullah | Director | 4 July 1996 – 17 June 1997 |
| 19 | A. K. M. Rezaul Karim | Director | 18 June 1997 – 9 July 1997 |
| 20 | G. M. Habibullah | Director | 12 July 1998 – 29 April 2001 |
| 21 | Md. Keramat Ali Molla | Director | 30 April 2001 – 31 August 2003 |
Rajshahi University of Engineering and Technology (RUET) – Vice-Chancellors (2003–present)
| 22 | Md. Keramat Ali Molla | Vice-Chancellor | 1 September 2003 – 8 May 2004 |
| 23 | A. F. M. Anwarul Haque | Vice-Chancellor | 9 May 2004 – 6 September 2008 |
| 24 | Muhammad Fazlul Bari | Vice-Chancellor | 7 September 2008 – 27 September 2009 |
| 25 | Sirajul Karim Choudhury | Vice-Chancellor | 27 September 2009 – 5 March 2013 |
| 26 | Md. Mortuza Ali | Vice-Chancellor | 6 March 2013 – 28 May 2014 |
| 27 | Mohd. Rafiqul Alam Beg | Vice-Chancellor | 28 May 2014 – 28 May 2018 |
| 28 | Rafiqul Islam Sekh | Vice-Chancellor | 30 July 2018 – 30 July 2022 |
| 29 | Md. Sazzad Hossain | Acting Vice-Chancellor | 3 August 2022 – 27 May 2023 |
| 30 | Md. Jahangir Alam | Vice-Chancellor | 20 August 2023 – 31 August 2024 |
| 31 | S. M. Abdur Razzak | Vice-Chancellor | 28 October 2024 – incumbent |

== Faculties and departments ==
Rajshahi University of Engineering and Technology has a total of 14 degree-awarding departments under four faculties.

| Faculty | Department | Seats |
|---|---|---|
| Faculty of Civil Engineering | Department of Civil Engineering | 180 |
| Faculty of Civil Engineering | Department of Urban and Regional Planning | 60 |
| Faculty of Civil Engineering | Department of Architecture | 30 |
| Faculty of Civil Engineering | Department of Building Engineering and Construction Management | 30 |
| Faculty of Mechanical Engineering | Department of Industrial and Production Engineering | 60 |
| Faculty of Mechanical Engineering | Department of Mechanical Engineering | 180 |
| Faculty of Mechanical Engineering | Department of Ceramics and Metallurgical Engineering | 60 |
| Faculty of Mechanical Engineering | Department of Mechatronics | 60 |
| Faculty of Mechanical Engineering | Department of Materials Science and Engineering | 60 |
| Faculty of Mechanical Engineering | Department of Chemical Engineering | 30 |
| Faculty of Electrical and Computer Engineering | Department of Electrical and Electronic Engineering | 180 |
| Faculty of Electrical and Computer Engineering | Department of Computer Science and Engineering | 180 |
| Faculty of Electrical and Computer Engineering | Department of Electrical and Computer Engineering | 60 |
| Faculty of Electrical and Computer Engineering | Department of Electronic and Telecommunication Engineering | 60 |
| Faculty of Applied Science and Humanities | Department of Mathematics | Postgraduate only |
| Faculty of Applied Science and Humanities | Department of Physics | Postgraduate only |
| Faculty of Applied Science and Humanities | Department of Chemistry | Postgraduate only |
| Faculty of Applied Science and Humanities | Department of Humanities | Postgraduate only |

== Student life ==
=== Residential system ===
Newly constructed male student residential hall of RUET

RUET operates as a predominantly residential university, with accommodation facilities forming a central component of student life. The university has eleven residential halls, including nine for male students and two for female students. These halls collectively accommodate a significant portion of undergraduate students.

| Hall | Type | Approx. capacity |
|---|---|---|
| Shahid President Ziaur Rahman Hall | Male | ~480 |
| Shahid Lt. Selim Hall | Male | ~350 |
| Sher-e-Bangla A K Fazlul Huq Hall | Male | ~450 |
| Shahid Abdul Hamid Hall | Male | ~225 |
| Shahid Shahidul Islam Hall | Male | ~225 |
| Tin Shed Hall | Male | ~100 |
| Male Hall-1 | Male | ~500 |
| Male Hall-2 | Male | ~500 |
| Female Hall-1 | Female | ~500 |
| Female Hall-2 | Female | ~500 |
| Male Hall-3 | Male | ~500 |

== Professional Accreditation ==
In May 2026, the B.Sc. programs in Civil Engineering (CE), Electrical and Electronic Engineering (EEE), and Computer Science and Engineering (CSE) were granted a six-year accreditation (valid from January 2026 to January 2032) by the Board of Accreditation for Engineering and Technical Education (BAETE). BAETE operates under the Institution of Engineers, Bangladesh (IEB), which achieved full signatory status of the Washington Accord in June 2024.

Under the Washington Accord framework, degrees from these accredited departments are recognized as substantially equivalent to engineering degrees from other signatory nations.

=== Further development ===
In February 2017, the Executive Committee of National Economic Council (ECNEC) approved 3.40 billion taka to implement a mega project for the RUET, aiming to well decorate and development the whole campus and its education and research. The ECNEC approved the project in the name of "Further Development Project of RUET".

== Organisations and clubs ==
=== Political organisations ===
RUET banned all forms of political activity on campus on 10 August 2024 after an emergency syndicate meeting. According to the university’s notice, teachers, officers, staff, and students are barred from involvement in political organisations or political activities on campus, and violations are subject to disciplinary action.

The decision followed student demands for an end to party politics on campus. The university also issued separate notices for students and officials on the same date.

In April 2026, the issue remained contentious on campus. One group of students demanded a referendum on student politics, while another group associated with Bangladesh Jatiyatabadi Chhatra Dal opposed the ban. The protests led to class and examination boycotts and renewed tensions on campus.

In February 2025, RUET also imposed disciplinary measures on 48 students in a separate case, including the expulsion of the president and general secretary of the RUET unit of Bangladesh Chhatra League. Students of Rajshahi University of Engineering and Technology (RUET) are actively involved in a wide range of academic, technical, cultural, and professional organisations. These student-led clubs organise seminars, workshops, competitions, social campaigns, and various co-curricular activities that contribute to leadership development, technical skills, and community engagement.

== Achievements ==
The university has been included in global rankings. In the Times Higher Education Impact Rankings 2024, RUET was placed within the 601–800 band globally and ranked 101–200 for Quality Education (SDG-4).

In the QS World University Rankings 2026, RUET was ranked 1401+ globally and 121st in Southern Asia.

== Notable alumni ==
- Engr. Md. Tareque Anwar Zahedee – Chief Engineer of the Education Engineering Department (EED).
- Engr. Md. Ahsan Jabir – Chief Engineer (West Zone), Bangladesh Railway.
- Engr. Md. Belal Hossain – Chief Engineer (Grade-1), Local Government Engineering Department (LGED).
- Engr. Md. Afzal Hossain – Director General, Bangladesh Railway.
- Faruk Ahmed – Additional Inspector General of Bangladesh Police and Director General of the SRB.
- Banaj Kumar Majumder – Retired Additional Inspector General of Bangladesh Police and former Chief of the Police Bureau of Investigation.

== Gallery ==
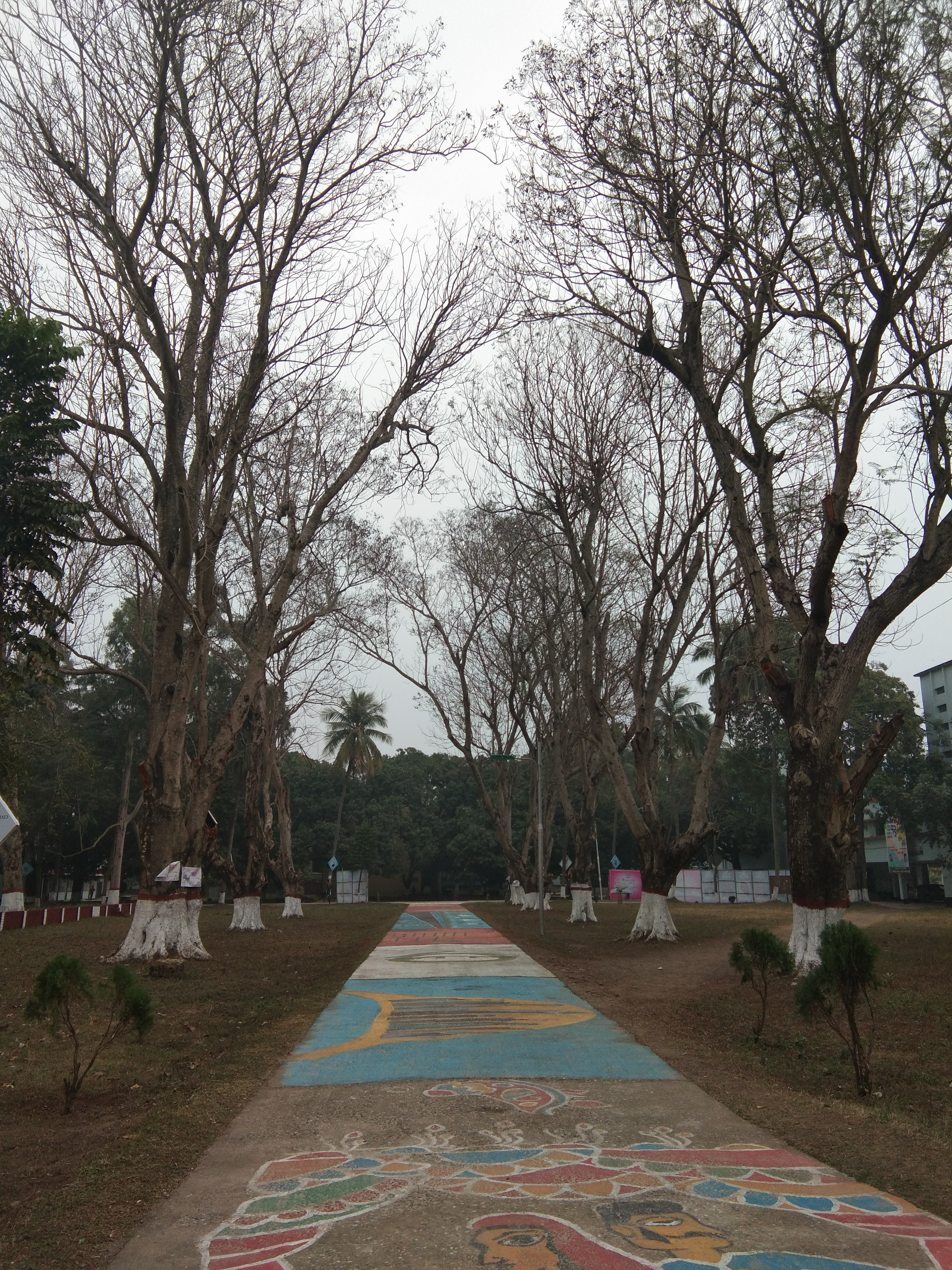
A panoramic view of the green RUET campus

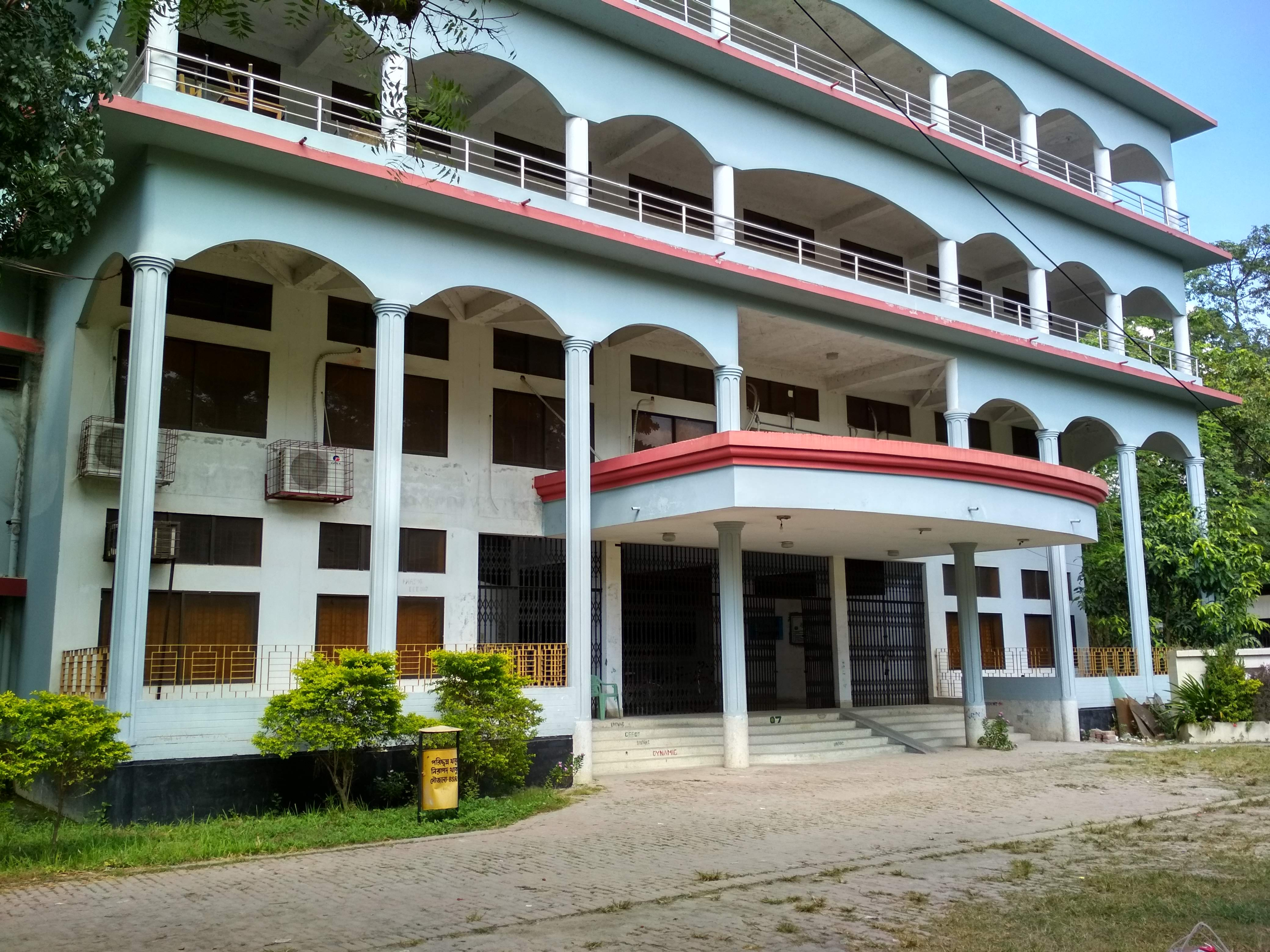
Front view of Academic Building I

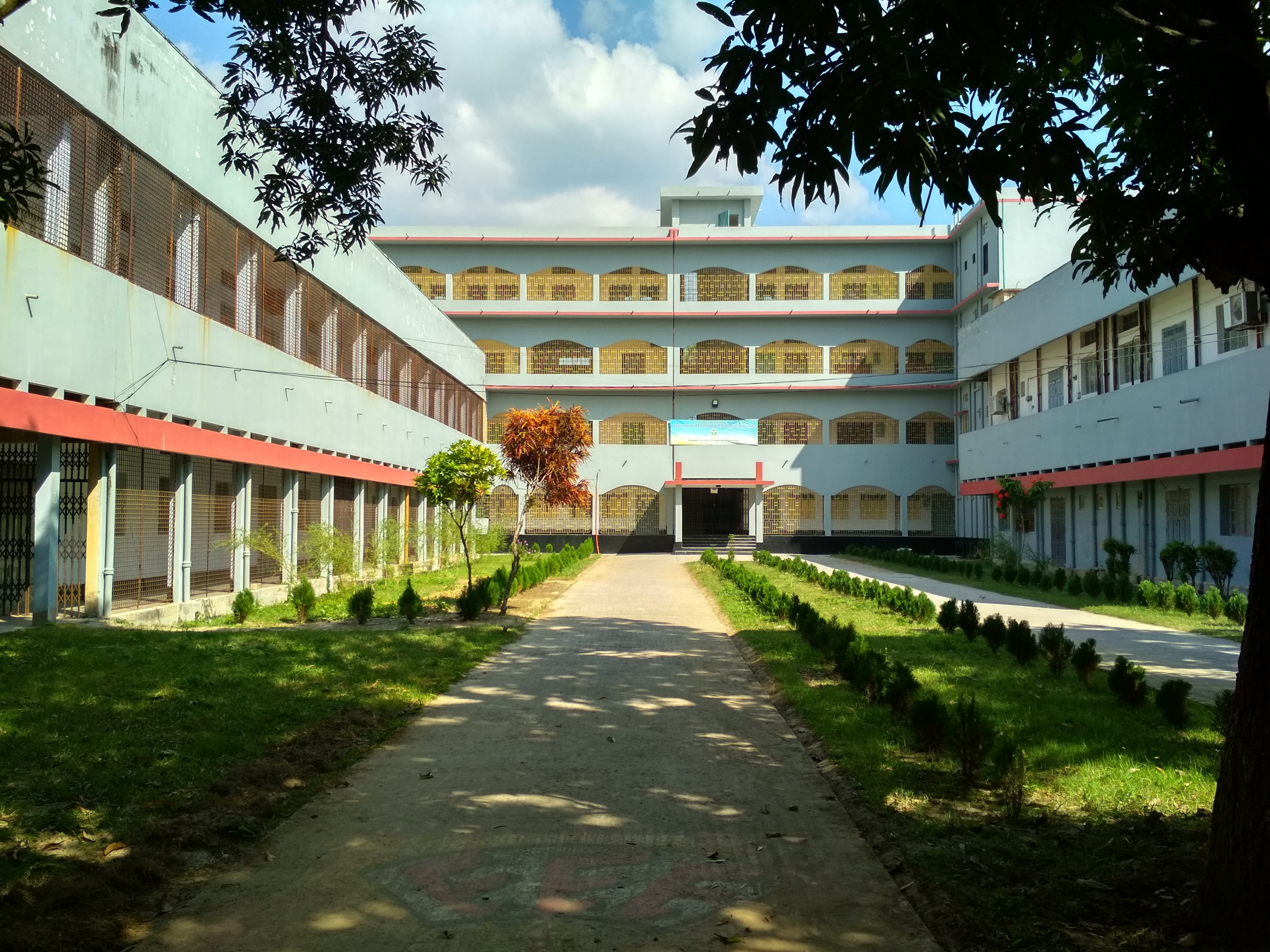
Academic Building II and surrounding landscape

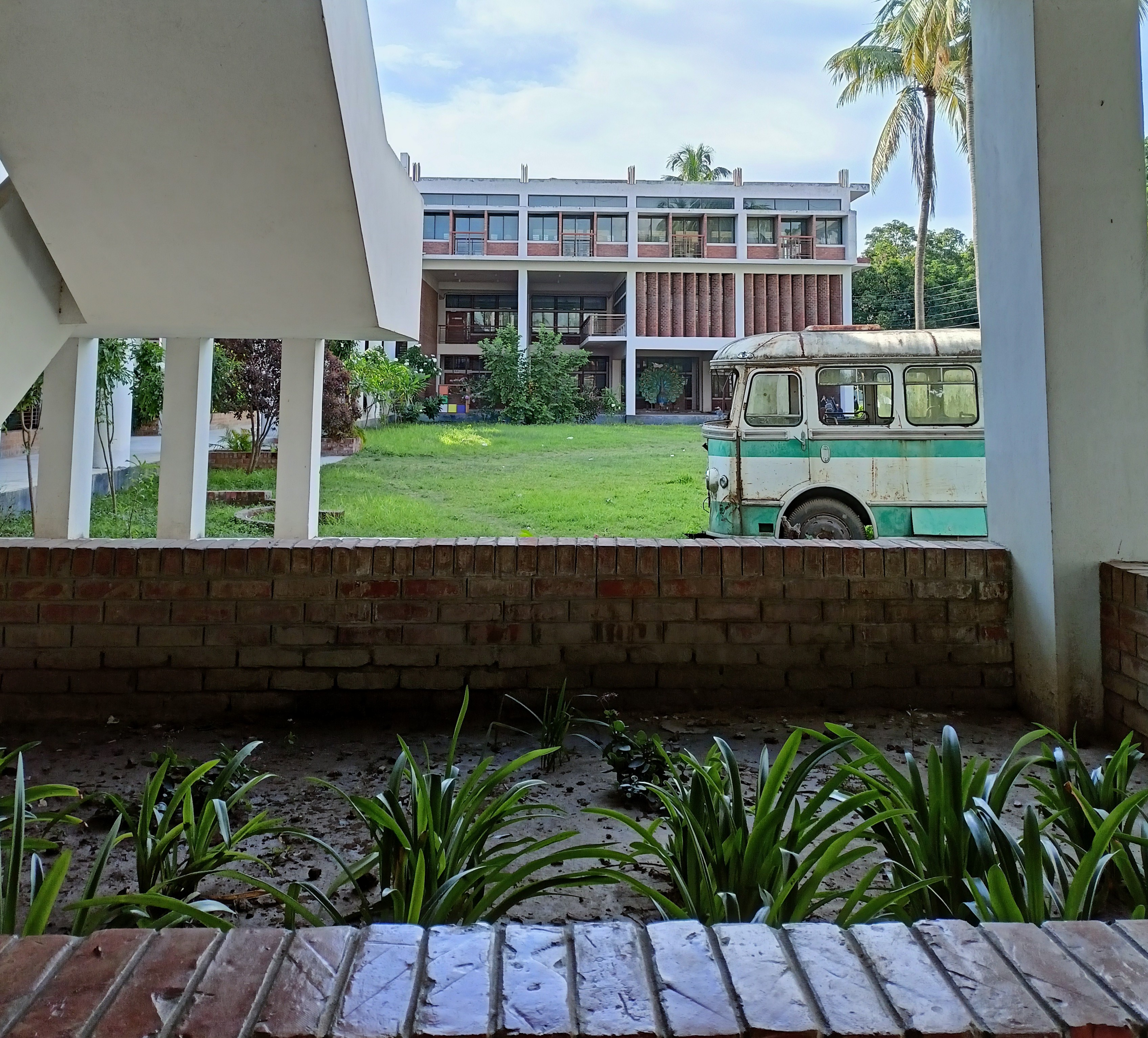
Department of Architecture building at RUET

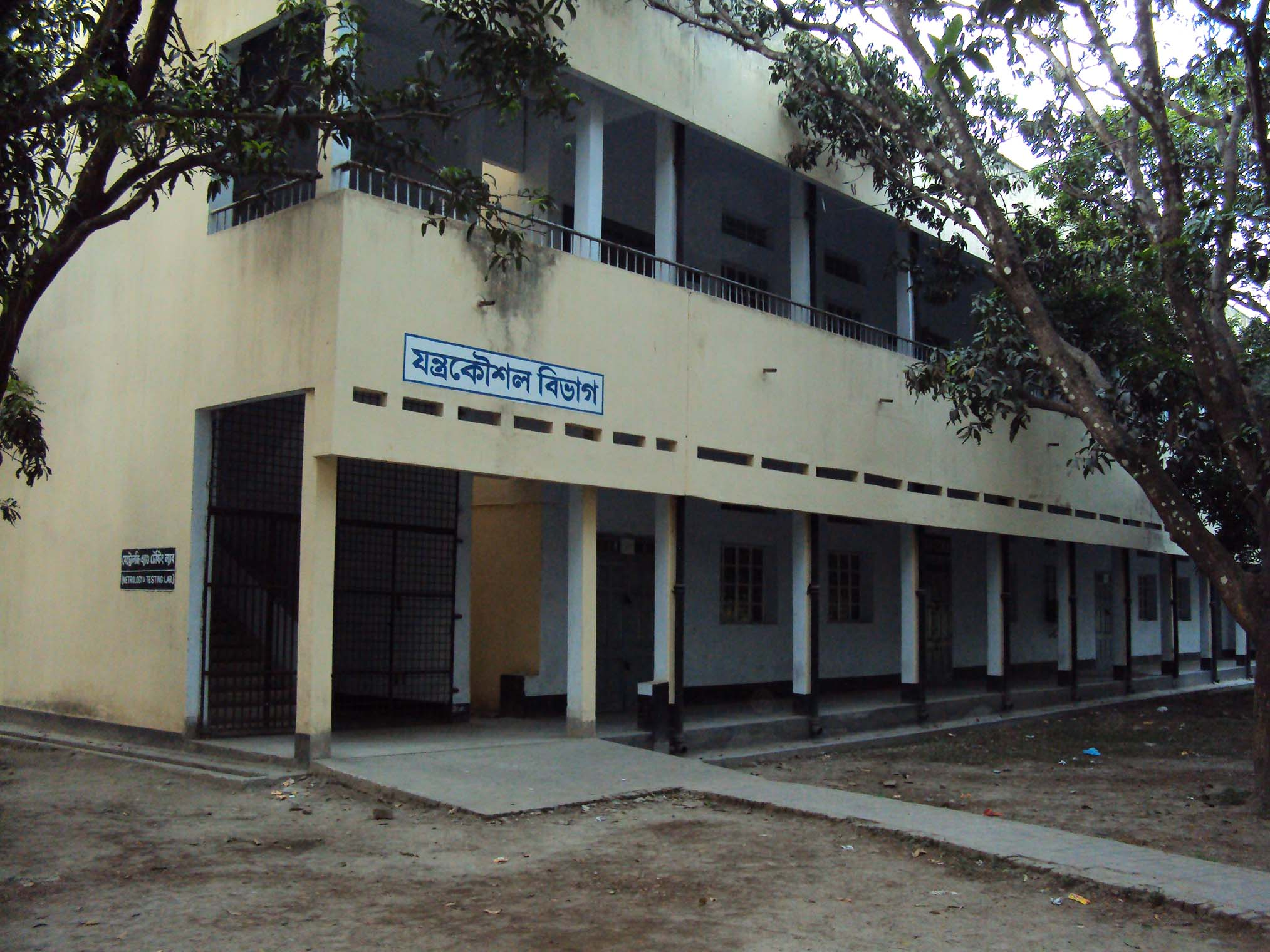
Department of Mechanical Engineering building

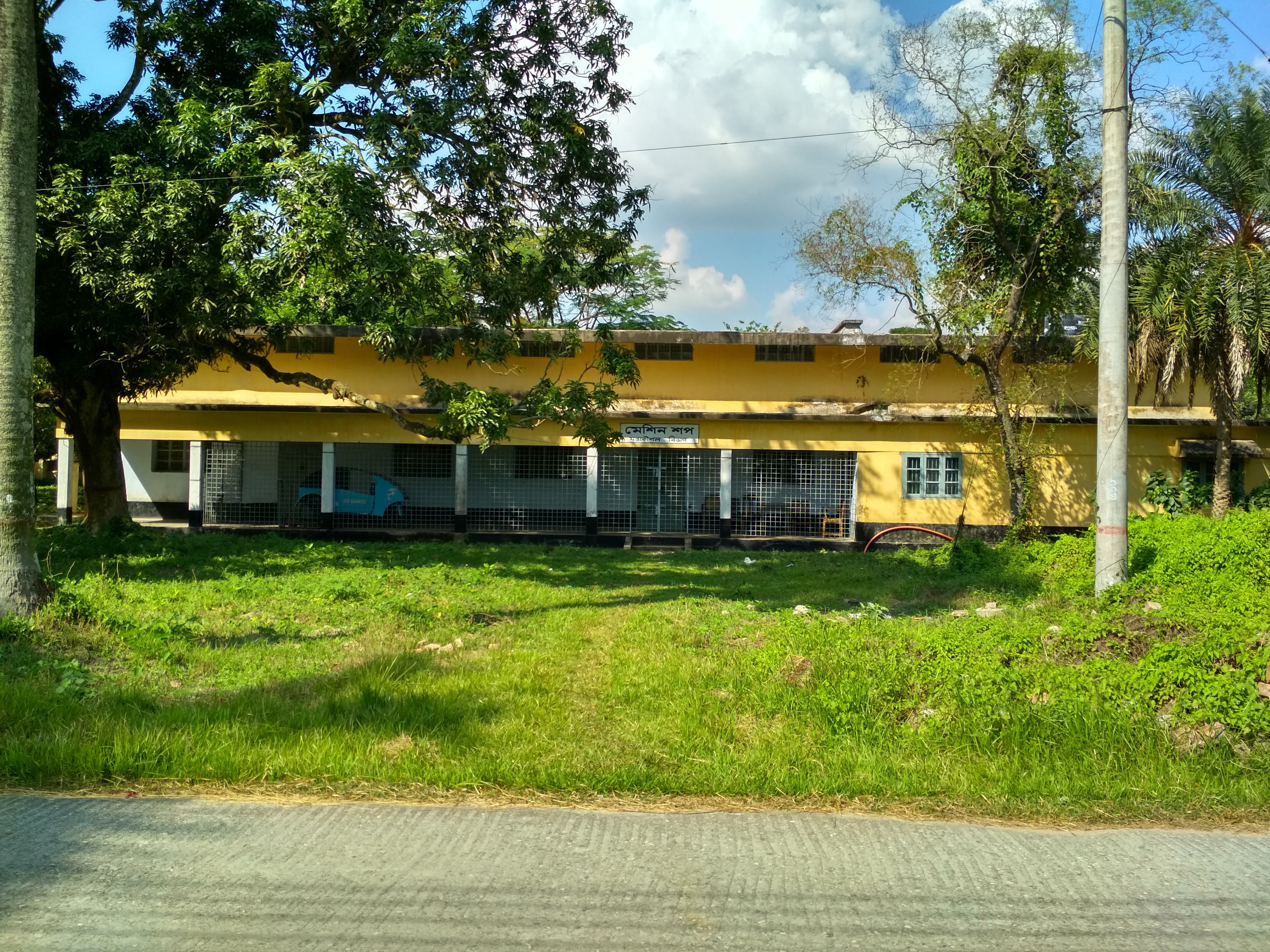
Machine shop used for engineering practical training

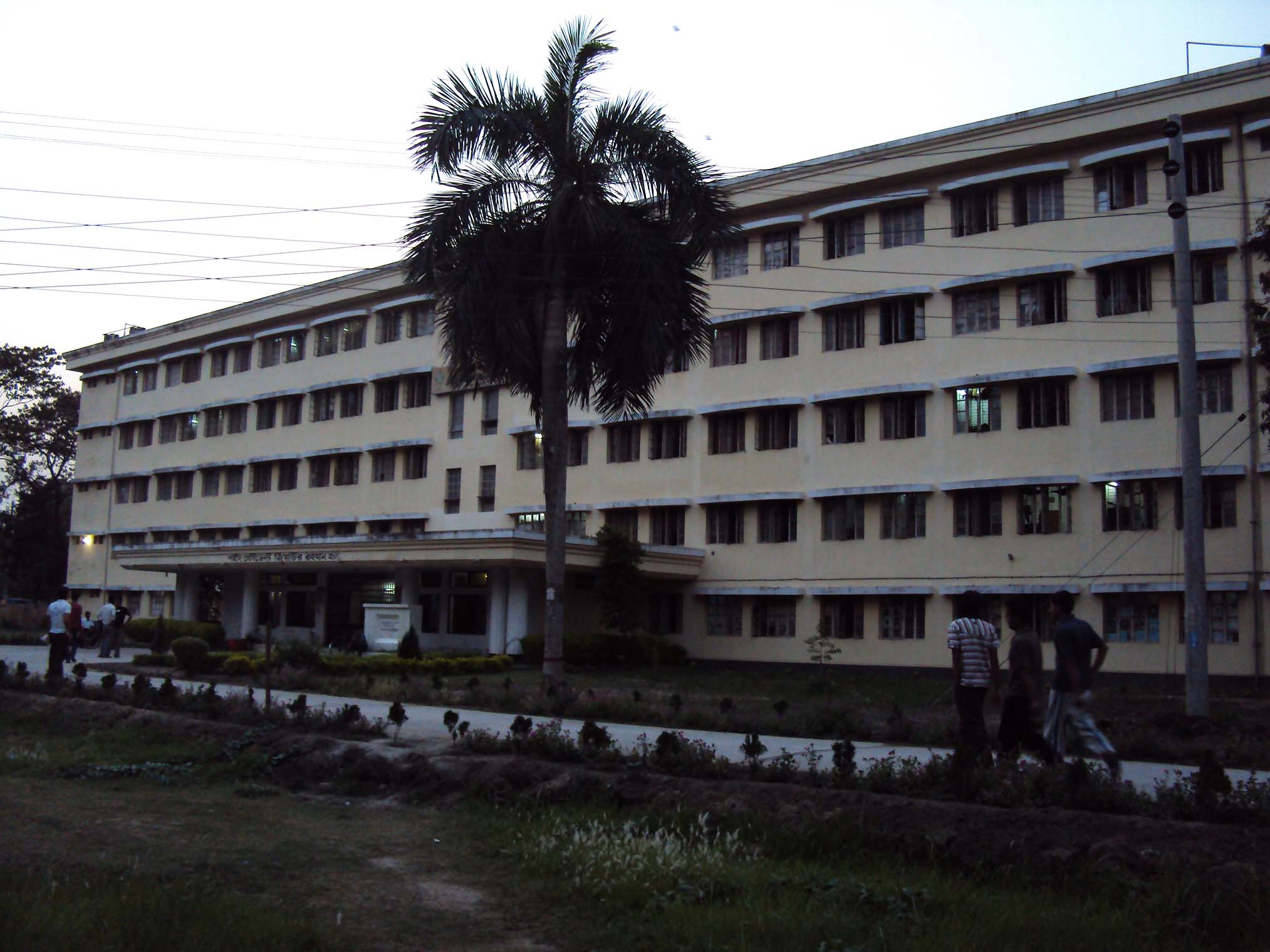
Shahid President Ziaur Rahman Hall, a residential hall for students

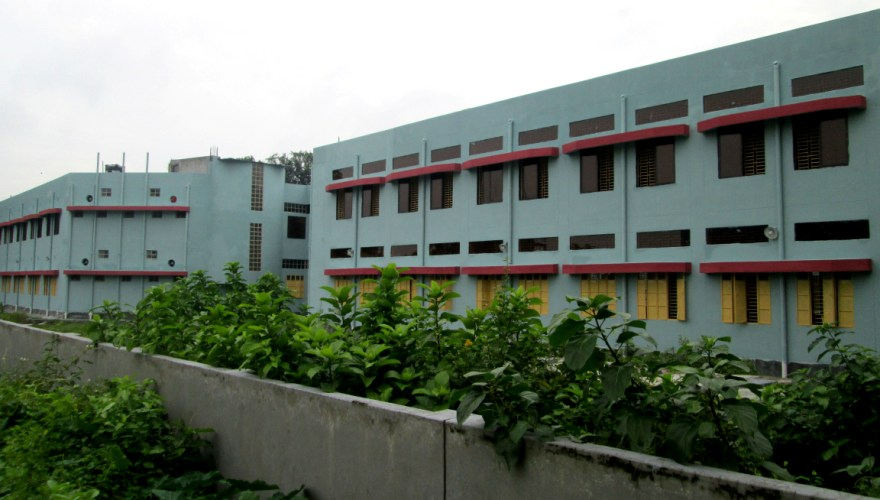
Bangabandhu Sheikh Mujibur Rahman Hall

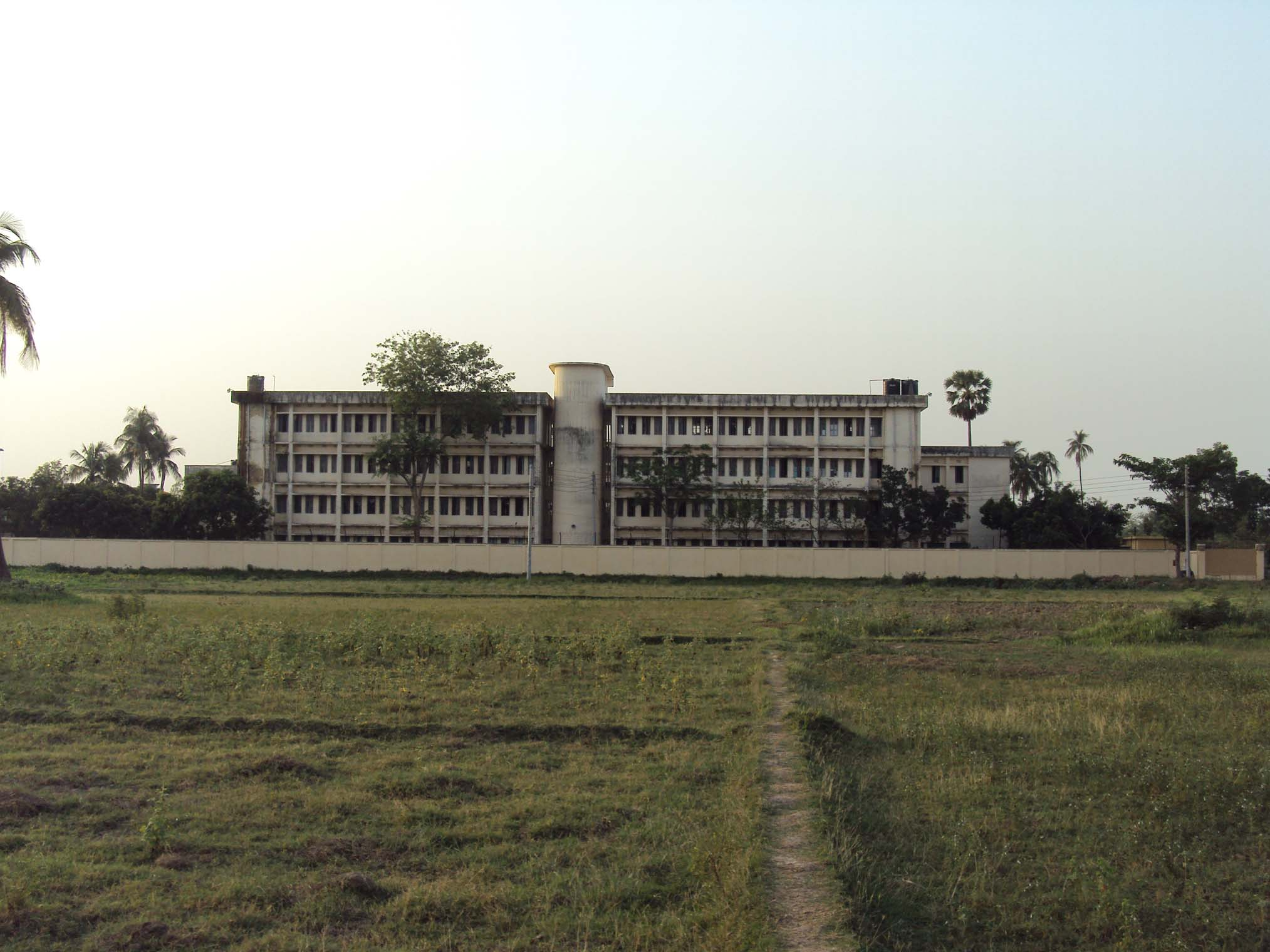
Deshratna Sheikh Hasina Hall, the female residential hall

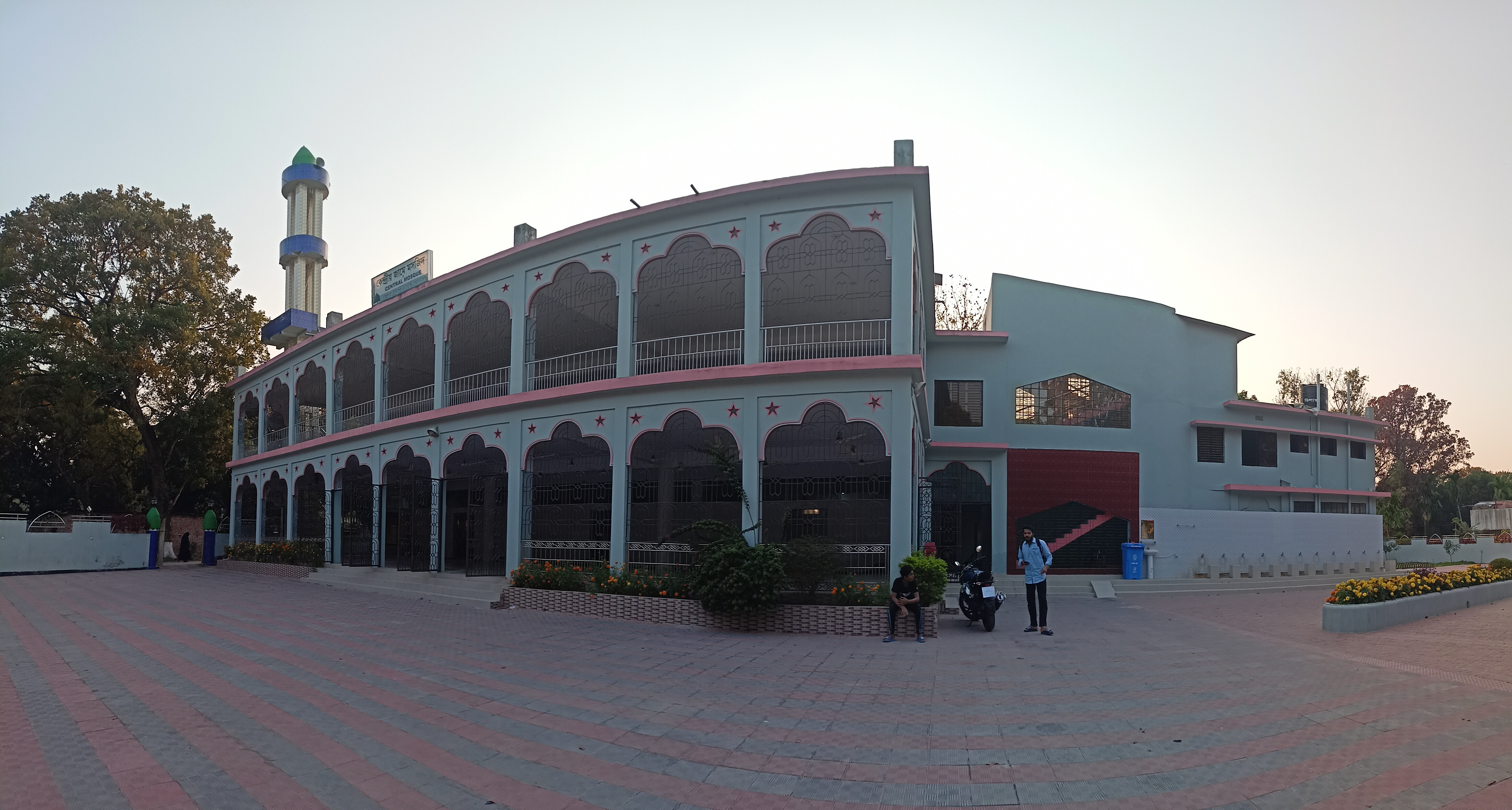
Central mosque located inside the RUET campus

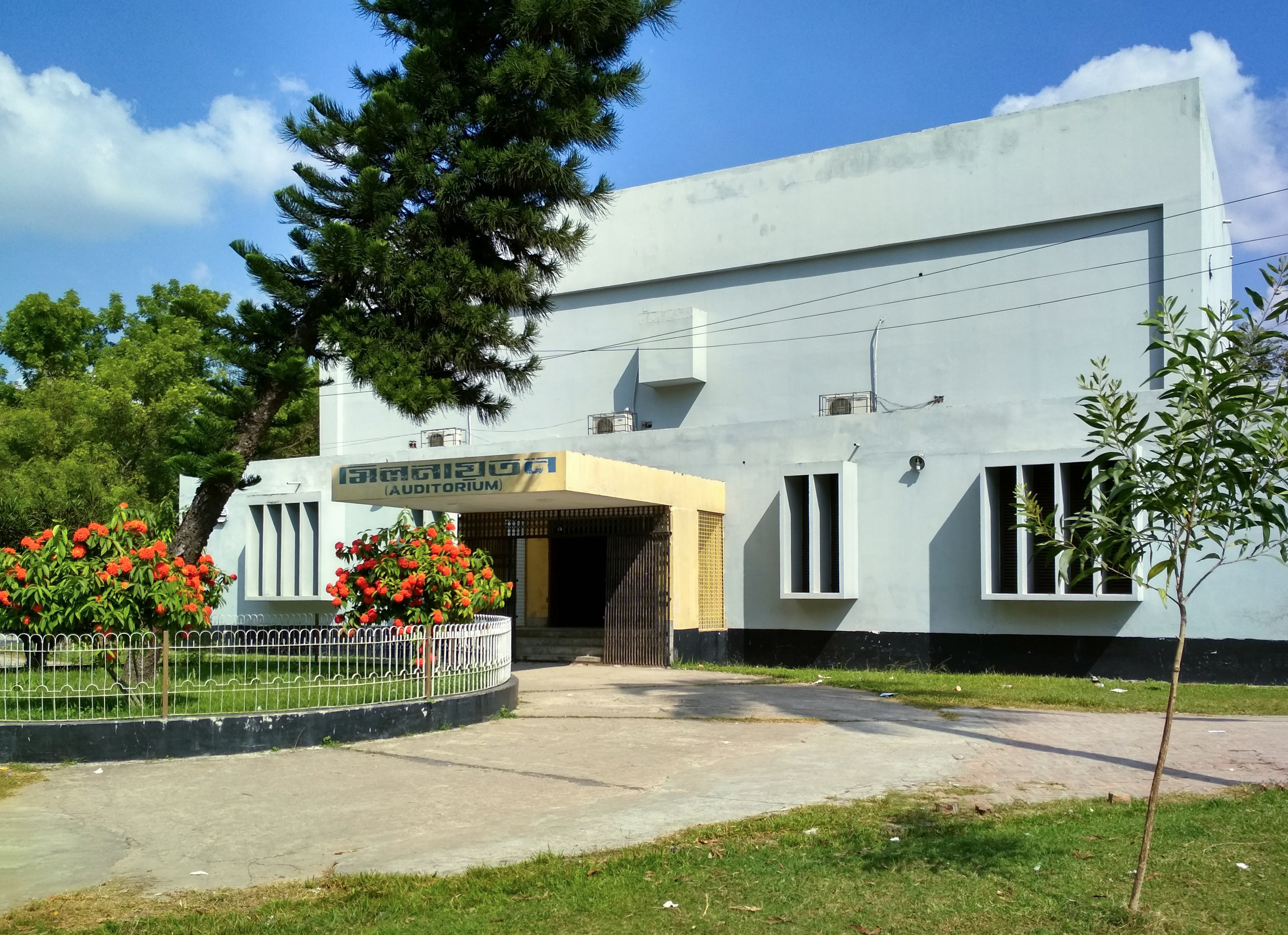
RUET central auditorium and event venue

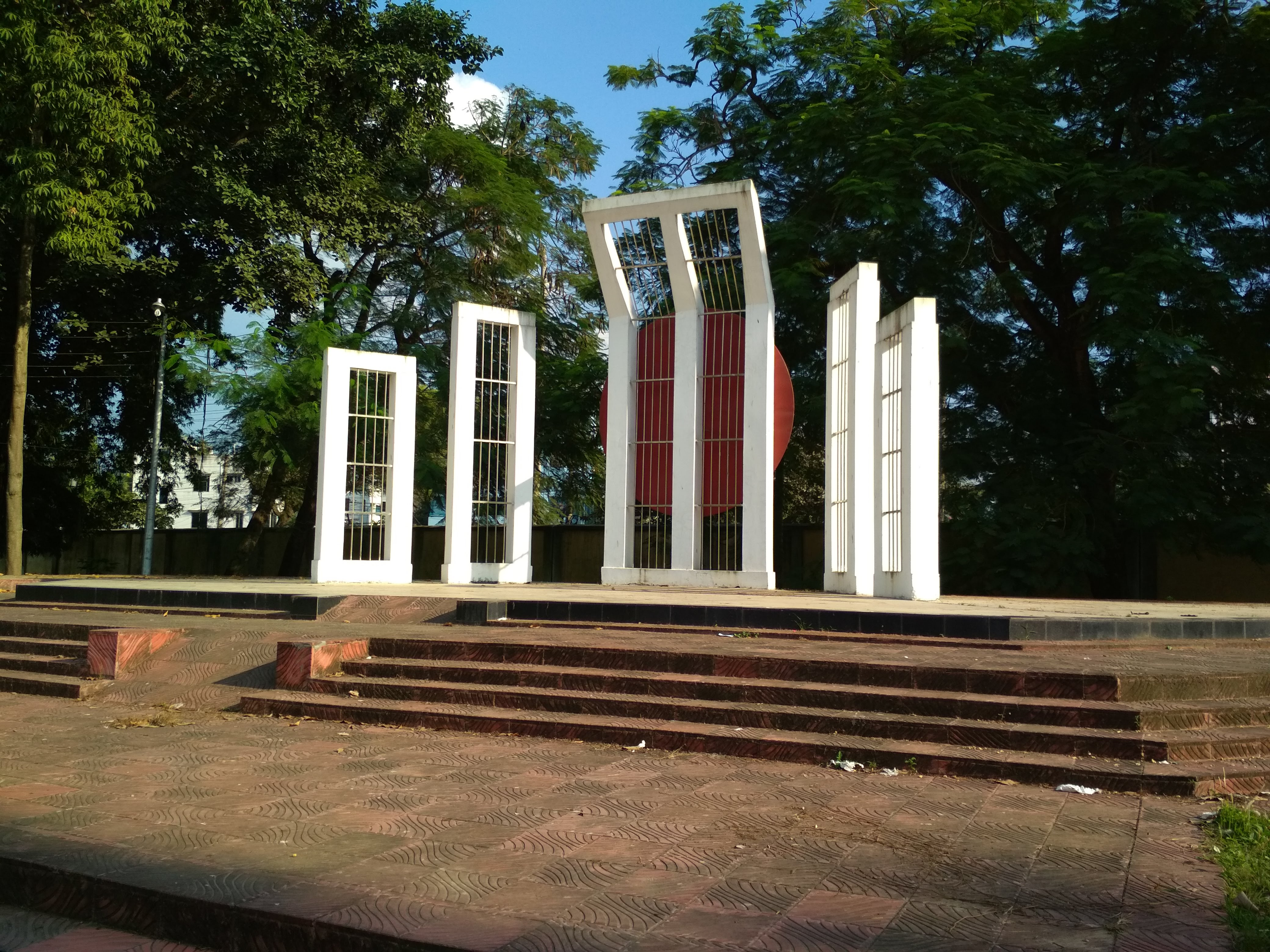
Campus Shaheed Minar commemorating the Language Movement martyrs

== See also ==
- List of Universities in Bangladesh
- BUET
- BUTEX
- CUET
- KUET
- DUET
- University Grants Commission
