= Debjani Ghosh =

- দেবযানী ঘোষ
- Born: 30 October 1988 (age 37); Chittagong, Bangladesh
- Education: University of Ulm; Chittagong University of Engineering & Technology
- Known for: HY4 Project Research Team Member
- Parent(s): Dipok Kumar Ghosh (father) and Indira Gosh (mother)

Debjani Ghosh (born 30 October 1988) is a Bangladeshi-born researcher of the University of Ulm. Currently she is researching on how to create a new hybrid system of Zero emission of electric airliners. She is also working on the power generation management of the next generation of HY4. aircraft. She is the Asst. Lecturer of Power Electronics in University of Ulm in Germany. As fundamental research is very rare in Bangladesh, her research work is highly appreciated in a Bangladeshi leading news portal Prothom Alo.

== Early life and education ==
She was born to Dipok Kumar Ghosh and Indira Ghosh on October 30, 1988. She went to Aparnacharan school and Chittagong Cantonment Public College. She completed her BSc in electrical and electronics engineering (EEE) from Chittagong University of Engineering & Technology and MSc in electrical power engineering from RWTH Aachen University.

== Career ==
She started her career as a lecturer in Premier University, Chittagong. Then went to Germany and did internship in Infineon Technologies. From the very beginning, her intention was to work with environment-friendly technology and renewable energy. So after completing M.Sc. from RWTH she joined the research team of Hy-4 project. Josef Kallo. is the chief researcher of this project.

On 29 September 2016, the HY4 aircraft took off its first official flight. from Stuttgart Airport. The HY4 is the world's first four-seat passenger aircraft powered solely by a hydrogen fuel cell system. A successful flight of a four-seat passenger plane, at the Stuttgart Airport in Germany, was completed on that day. Being a member of this research team, she became part of the history of civil aviation in the world.

She also runs a web portal German Probashe. She is the vice-president (culture), editor of German Probashe. This portal win Deutsche Welle The BOBs Award, People's Choice Winner of User Award Bengali. in 2016.
