= Mahmud Abdul Matin Bhuiyan =

Bangladeshi academic

- মাহমুদ আব্দুল মতিন ভূইয়া

Vice-Chancellor of Chittagong University of Engineering & Technology
- In office 30 October 2024 – 27 July 2026
- Preceded by: Mohammad Rafiqul Alam
- Succeeded by: Dr. Abu Sadat Muhammad Sayem

Personal details
- Education: Ph.D (Electrical and Electronic Engineering)
- Alma mater: National University of Malaysia

Mahmud Abdul Matin Bhuiyan is an academic. He is the former vice-chancellor of Chittagong University of Engineering & Technology.

== Early life ==
Bhuiyan completed his bachelor's degree in Electrical Engineering from the Bangladesh Institute of Technology, Chittagong. He pursued a master's degree from University of Technology Malaysia and later earned his Ph.D. from the National University of Malaysia.

== Career ==
Bhuiyan began his academic career in October 1996 as a lecturer in the Department of Electrical and Electronic Engineering at CUET. Over the years, he progressed through various academic ranks and was promoted to professor in June 2013.

On 30 October 2024, Bhuiyan was appointed as the 6th vice-chancellor of CUET. His appointment was announced through a notification issued by the Secondary and Higher Education Division of the Ministry of Education. Prior to his appointment as vice-chancellor, he served as the head of the Department of Nuclear Engineering at CUET.

== Controversy ==
In 2026, allegations of serious irregularities and nepotism were raised against Mahmud Abdul Matin Bhuiya in the teacher recruitment process. It was alleged that, in an attempt to secure a university teaching position for his daughter, he deliberately and tactfully excluded the candidate who had secured first place on the merit list.
