= Mohammad Rafiqul Alam =

Bangladeshi academic

- মোহাম্মদ রফিকুল আলম
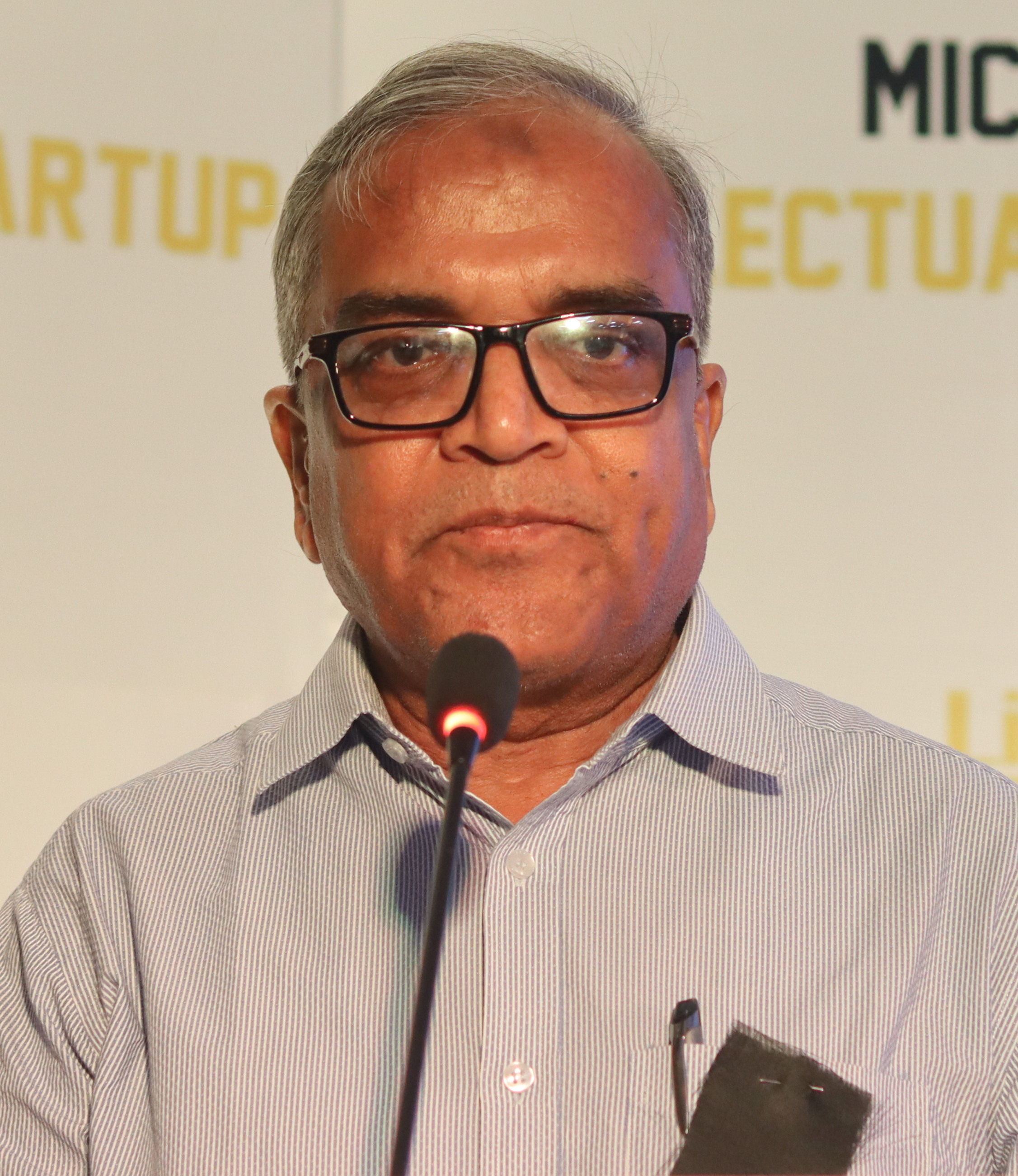
- Mohammad Rafiqul Alam in 2023

Vice-Chancellor of Chittagong University of Engineering & Technology
- In office 27 April 2016 – 16 August 2024
- Preceded by: Md. Jahangir Alam
- Succeeded by: Mahmud Abdul Matin Bhuiyan

Personal details
- Born: 1958 (age 67–68) Chittagong District, East Pakistan, Pakistan
- Education: Chittagong Engineering College
- Occupation: Professor, university administrator

Mohammad Rafiqul Alam is a Bangladeshi academic and former vice-chancellor of the Chittagong University of Engineering & Technology. He is the president of the Association of Universities of Bangladesh (Bangladesh Bishwabidyalaya Parishad).

== Early life ==
Alam was born in 1958 in Mariam Nagar, Rangunia, Chittagong District, East Pakistan, Pakistan (now in Rangunia Upazila, Bangladesh). His father was Abdul Hossian and his mother was Khairunessa. He did his bachelor's degree in electrical and electronic engineering at the Chittagong Engineering College (now Chittagong University of Engineering & Technology) in 1979. He did his master's degree in engineering and his PhD.

== Career ==
Alam joined the Chittagong Engineering College in 1982 as a lecturer. He was promoted to assistant professor in 1986.

Alam served as the dean of the Department of Electrical & Electronic Engineering. He is the president of the Chittagong University of Engineering & Technology Library Committee. Alam was promoted to associate professor in 2007.

In March 2013, Alam was appointed the pro-vice chancellor of the Chittagong University of Engineering & Technology. He was the first pro-vice chancellor of the university since it was founded in 2003.

On 27 April 2016, Alam was appointed the vice-chancellor of the Chittagong University of Engineering & Technology. He was reappointed vice-chancellor of the Chittagong University of Engineering & Technology in August 2020. He is the president of the Association of Universities of Bangladesh (Bangladesh Bishwabidyalaya Parishad), a grouping of vice-chancellors of vice-chancellors of public universities in Bangladesh.

Alam voiced support for the re-election of Prime Minister Sheikh Hasina at an event of the Bangladesh Chhatra League at the Chittagong University of Engineering & Technology in October 2023. He said Islam was the "perfect way of life" at an event marking the birth of the Islamic prophet Mohammad at the Chittagong University of Engineering & Technology.
