= Md. Jahangir Alam =

Bangladeshi academic

Mohammad Jahangir Alam
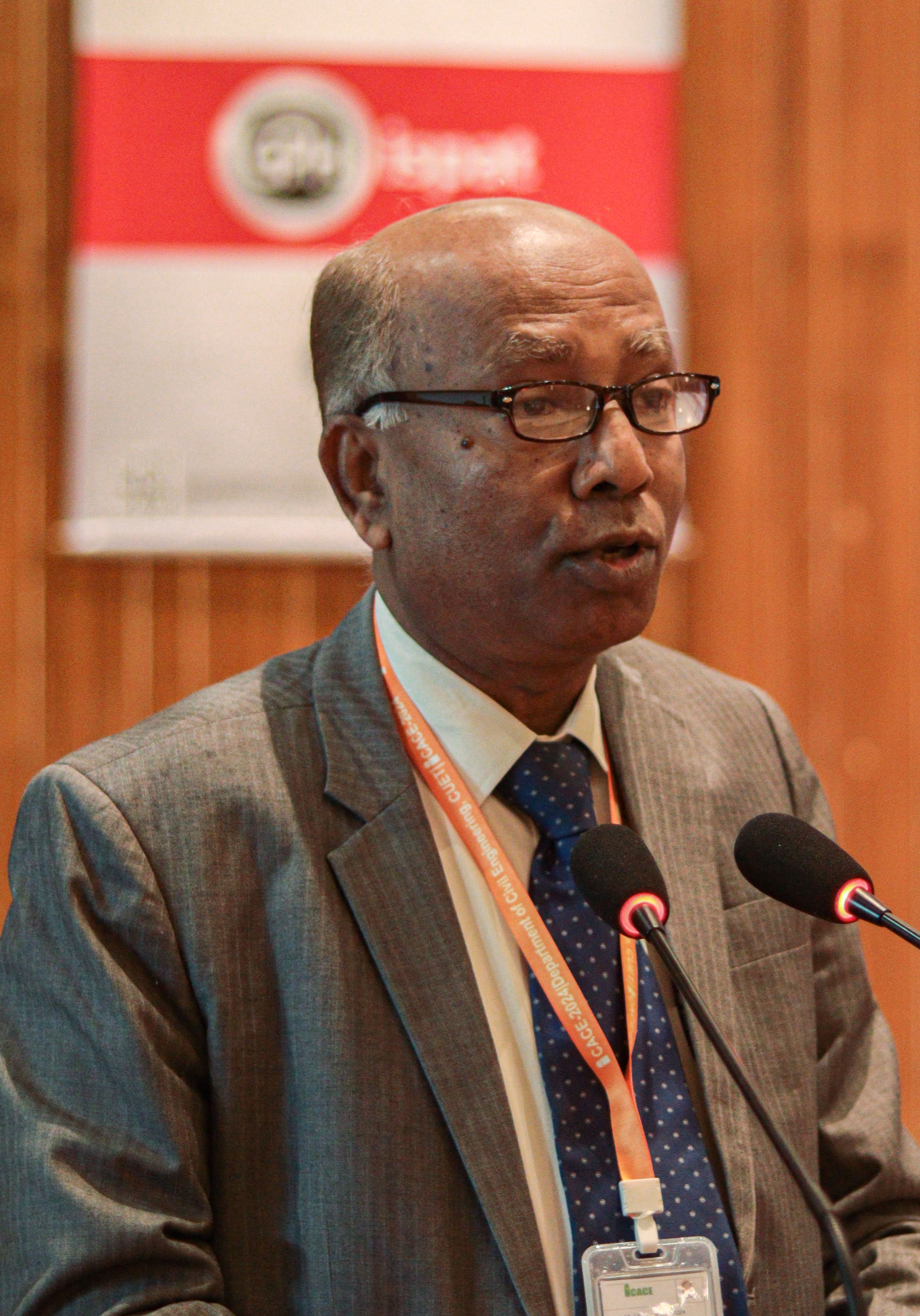
- Alam in 2024

Vice-Chancellor of Rajshahi University of Engineering & Technology
- In office 13 August 2023 – 31 August 2024
- Preceded by: Md. Sazzad Hossain (acting)
- Succeeded by: S. M. Abdur Razzak

Chairman of Chattogram WASA
- Incumbent
- Assumed office 14 January 2020
- Preceded by: S. M. Nazrul Islam

Vice-Chancellor of Chittagong University of Engineering & Technology
- In office 28 January 2012 – 15 April 2016
- Preceded by: Shyamal Kanti Biswas
- Succeeded by: Mohammad Rafiqul Alam

Personal details
- Born: 30 November 1960 (age 65) Chandanaish, Chittagong District, East Pakistan, Pakistan
- Education: Chittagong Engineering College; Asian Institute of Technology; University of Madras
- Occupation: Professor, university administrator

Md. Jahangir Alam is a Bangladeshi academic, earthquake expert, and former vice-chancellor of Rajshahi University of Engineering & Technology.

Alam is also a former vice-chancellor of Chittagong University of Engineering and Technology and of University of Science and Technology Chittagong.

== Early life ==
Alam was born on 30 November 1960 in Chittagong District, East Pakistan. He graduated from Gasbaria NG High School and Chittagong College in 1976 and 1978 respectively. He did his bachelor's degree in engineering at Chittagong Engineering College. In 1991, he completed his master's degree in engineering in Structural Engineering. He completed his PhD in 1994. He completed a diploma degree at the Asian Institute of Technology on Finite Element.

== Career ==
From 2012 to 2014, Alam was the vice chancellor of Chittagong University of Engineering and Technology.

Alam was the vice chancellor of University of Science and Technology Chittagong from 2019 to 2023. On 20 August 2023, Alam was appointed the vice-chancellor of Rajshahi University of Engineering & Technology. He replaced Md. Rafiqul Islam Sheikh one year after his term ended.
