= Shyamal Kanti Biswas =

Bangladeshi academic (1948–2019)

- শ্যামল কান্তি বিশ্বাস

Vice-Chancellor of Chittagong University of Engineering & Technology
- In office 14 August 2007 – 28 January 2012
- Preceded by: Mohammad Mozammel Haque
- Succeeded by: Md. Jahangir Alam

Personal details
- Born: 1 November 1948
- Died: 1 December 2019 (aged 71)
- Education: PhD
- Alma mater: Bangladesh University of Engineering and Technology; Kyushu University

Shyamal Kanti Biswas (1 November 1948 – 1 December 2019) was a Bangladeshi academic. He served as the vice-chancellor of Chittagong University of Engineering and Technology (CUET).

== Biography ==
Biswas was born on 1 November 1948 in Biswas Para, Pekua, Cox's Bazar. He graduated from Bangladesh University of Engineering and Technology and completed his PhD studies at Kyushu University.

Biswas served as the acting vice-chancellor of Chittagong University of Engineering and Technology from 14 August 2007 to 28 January 2008. Later, he served as the vice-chancellor of Chittagong University of Engineering and Technology from 29 January 2008 to 28 January 2012. After retirement he served as a guest professor at Ahsanullah University of Science and Technology in Dhaka for around four years.

Biswas was married to Mira Biswas. Together they had a son and two daughters.

Biswas died on 1 December 2019 at the age of 71 at St. Joseph Regional Medical Center in Lewiston.
