= S. M. Abdur Razzak =

Bangladeshi electrical engineer (born 1974)

Vice-Chancellor
- Incumbent
- Assumed office 28 October 2024
- Preceded by: Md. Jahangir Alam

Personal details
- Born: 1974 Natore District, Bangladesh
- Education: Rajshahi University of Engineering and Technology; University of the Ryukyus
- Occupation: Professor, Electrical Engineer, Academic Administrator

S. M. Abdur Razzak (born 1974) is a Bangladeshi electrical engineer, academic and university administrator. He is a professor in the Department of Electrical and Electronic Engineering at Rajshahi University of Engineering and Technology (RUET) and has been serving as the vice-chancellor of the university since 28 October 2024.

== Early life and education ==
Razzak was born in 1974 in Bhulbariya village of Singra Upazila, Natore District, Bangladesh. He completed his Secondary School Certificate in 1989 from Kaligram Rathindranath Institution in Atrai, Naogaon and Higher Secondary Certificate in 1991 from Government Azizul Haque College, Bogura.

Razzak obtained his Bachelor of Science in Electrical and Electronic Engineering in 1995 from Bangladesh Institute of Technology, Rajshahi (now RUET) and later completed his Master of Science in Engineering in the same field from RUET in 2005. He earned a Master of Engineering degree in 2007 and a PhD in 2010 from the University of the Ryukyus, Japan. In 2011, he completed postdoctoral research at the same institution as a JSPS fellow.

== Career ==
Razzak joined the Department of Electrical and Electronic Engineering at RUET as a lecturer in 1999. He was promoted to assistant professor in 2003, associate professor in 2011, and professor in 2013. In addition to his academic duties, he has served as: head of the Department of Electrical and Electronic Engineering and dean of the Faculty of Electrical and Computer Engineering. He has also been involved in academic research, postgraduate supervision and administrative development activities within the university.

On 27 October 2024, Razzak was appointed as the vice-chancellor of Rajshahi University of Engineering and Technology for a four-year term by the Government of Bangladesh, and officially assumed office on 28 October 2024.

In January 2026, Razzak was elected President of the Bangladesh University Council.
