= Ayub Chowdhury =

Bangladeshi retired major general

Mohammad Ayub Chowdhury
- Military career
- Allegiance: Bangladesh
- Branch: Bangladesh Army
- Service years: – 2022
- Rank: Major General
- Commands: Director General of Department of Immigration & Passports
- Awards: Sena Gourab Padak(SGP); President Border Guard Medal Service(PBGMS)

Mohammad Ayub Chowdhury (Note: SGP, PBGMS, ndc, psc) is a retired major general of the Bangladesh Army who served as the director general of the Department of Immigration and Passports of the Ministry of Home Affairs.

== Career ==
Major General Ayub Chowdhury is a decorated veteran of the Bangladesh Army. He was appointed as the director general of the Department of Immigration & Passports on 29 July 2020, replacing the incumbent, Major General Shakil Ahmed. He retired from active service in October 2022.
