= List of vice-chancellors of Bangladeshi universities =

This is the current list of the vice-chancellors of the universities in Bangladesh. The chancellor is the ceremonial head, the position which is held by the incumbent President of Bangladesh, currently President Mohammed Shahabuddin . The vice-chancellor is the chief academic officer and the chief executive of the university appointed by the chancellor for a four-year term.

University	Vice-chancellor	Since
Ahsanullah University of Science and Technology	Md. Ashraful Hoque	5 September 2024; 21 months ago
American International University-Bangladesh	Saiful Islam	23 May 2024; 2 years ago
Asian University for Women	Rubana Huq	15 February 2022; 4 years ago
Atish Dipankar University of Science and Technology	Md Zahangir Alam	20 January 2022; 4 years ago
Aviation and Aerospace University, Bangladesh	Air Vice Marshal M Mustafizur Rahman	21 January 2026; 5 months ago
Bangladesh Agricultural University	A K Fazlul Haque Bhuiyan	19 September 2024; 21 months ago
Bangladesh Islami University	Md Aminul Haque Bhuyan	18 April 2022; 4 years ago
Bangladesh Maritime University	Mohammad Musa	31 January 2023; 3 years ago
Bangladesh Medical University	Md. Shahinul Alam	4 December 2024; 18 months ago
Bangladesh Open University	ABM Obaidul Islam	12 September 2024; 21 months ago
Bangladesh University	Md. Jahangir Alam	6 February 2025; 16 months ago
Bangladesh University of Business and Technology	A B M Shawkat Ali	1 October 2024; 20 months ago
Bangladesh University of Engineering and Technology	A. B. M. Badruzzaman	12 September 2024; 21 months ago
Bangladesh University of Textiles	Md. Zulhash Uddin	28 October 2024; 20 months ago
Begum Rokeya University, Rangpur	Md. Showkat Ali	18 September 2024; 21 months ago
BRAC University	Syed Ferhat Anwar	11 September 2024; 21 months ago
Canadian University of Bangladesh	HM Jahirul Haque	21 April 2022; 4 years ago
Chandpur Science and Technology University	Payer Ahmed	6 November 2024; 19 months ago
Chittagong University of Engineering & Technology	Mahmud Abdul Matin Bhuiyan	30 October 2024; 19 months ago
Chittagong Veterinary and Animal Sciences University	ASM Lutful Ahasan	1 January 2023; 3 years ago
Comilla University	Md Haider Ali	19 September 2024; 21 months ago
Daffodil International University	M. R. Kabir	10 July 2025; 11 months ago
Dhaka Central University	Md. Nurul Islam	16 March 2026; 3 months ago
Dhaka University of Engineering & Technology	Mohammad Zoynal Abedin	21 October 2024; 20 months ago
Eastern University	Professor Dr Farid Ahammad Sobhani	25 May 2025; 13 months ago
East West University	Shams Rahman	18 October 2023; 2 years ago
European University of Bangladesh	Md. Alim Dad	25 June 2021; 5 years ago
Exim Bank Agricultural University Bangladesh	ABM Rashedul Hassan	1 September 2022; 3 years ago
First Capital University of Bangladesh	M. Mofazzal Hossain	As of 17 May 2025
Gazipur Agricultural University	GKM Mustafizur Rahman	27 October 2024; 20 months ago
Gopalganj Science and Technology University	Hossain Uddin Shekhar	29 October 2024; 20 months ago
Green University of Bangladesh	Mohammad Shorif Uddin	16 May 2024; 2 years ago
Hajee Mohammad Danesh Science & Technology University	Mohammed Enamullah	21 September 2024; 21 months ago
Independent University, Bangladesh	Tanweer Hasan	23 February 2022; 4 years ago
International Islamic University Chittagong	Mohammad Ali Azadi	5 February 2025; 16 months ago
International University of Business Agriculture and Technology	Abdur Rab	3 January 2018; 8 years ago
Islamic Arabic University	Mohammad Abdur Rashid	7 April 2023; 3 years ago
Islamic University, Bangladesh	Nakib Muhammad Nasrullah	21 October 2024; 20 months ago
Islamic University of Technology	Mohammad Rafiqul Islam	2 September 2020; 5 years ago
Jagannath University	Md. Rezaul Karim	18 September 2024; 21 months ago
Jahangirnagar University	Mohammad Kamrul Ahsan	5 September 2024; 21 months ago
Jamalpur Science and Technology University	Mohammad Raknuzzaman	As of 17 May 2025
Jashore University of Science and Technology	Md. Abdul Majid	As of 17 May 2025
Jatiya Kabi Kazi Nazrul Islam University	Md Jahangir Alam	18 September 2024; 21 months ago
Khulna Agricultural University	Shahidur Rahman Khan	September 2018; 7 years ago
Khulna University	Md Rezaul Karim	18 October 2024; 20 months ago
Khulna University of Engineering & Technology	Md. Maksud Helali	24 July 2025; 11 months ago
Khwaja Yunus Ali University	Hossain Reza	1 March 2015; 11 years ago
Mawlana Bhashani Science and Technology University	Md. Anwarul Azim Akhand	21 September 2024; 21 months ago
National University, Bangladesh	A. S. M. Amanullah	28 August 2024; 22 months ago
Netrokona University	Khandaker Md. Ashraful Mumin	As of 17 May 2025
Noakhali Science and Technology University	Muhammad Ismail	5 September 2024; 21 months ago
North South University	Abdul Hannan Chowdhury	12 September 2024; 21 months ago
Northern University, Bangladesh	Anwar Hossain	3 April 2017; 9 years ago
Pabna University of Science and Technology	S M Abdul Awal	23 September 2024; 21 months ago
Patuakhali Science and Technology University	Swadesh Chandra Samanta	17 May 2021; 5 years ago
People's University of Bangladesh	Md Alauddin	11 April 2024; 2 years ago
Primeasia University	Suvamoy Datta	
Rabindra University, Bangladesh	Md Shah Azam	7 December 2021; 4 years ago
Rajshahi University of Engineering & Technology	SM Abdur Razzaq	28 October 2024; 20 months ago
Rangamati Science and Technology University	Atiar Rahman	9 January 2025; 17 months ago
Royal University of Dhaka	M. Abul Kashem Mozumdar	6 December 2023; 2 years ago
Shahjalal University of Science and Technology	AM Sarwaruddin Chowdhury	18 September 2024; 21 months ago
Sher-e-Bangla Agricultural University	Md Abdul Latif	5 September 2024; 21 months ago
Sonargaon University	Md. Abul Bashar	31 July 2019; 6 years ago
Southeast University	Yusuf Mahbubul Islam	19 May 2024; 2 years ago
Stamford University Bangladesh	Ali Naqi	7 August 2017; 8 years ago
State University of Bangladesh	Md. Akhter Hossain Khan	
Sylhet Agricultural University	Md. Alimul Islam	17 October 2024; 20 months ago
Teesta University	Abul Kashem	24 November 2023; 2 years ago
United International University	Md. Abul Kashem Mia	9 August 2018; 7 years ago
University of Asia Pacific	Qumrul Ahsan	16 February 2022; 4 years ago
University of Barishal	Mohammad Taufiq Alam (interim)	14 May 2025; 13 months ago
University of Chittagong	Muhammad Yeahia Akhter	18 September 2024; 21 months ago
University of Development Alternative	Rafiqul Islam Sharif	13 September 2017; 8 years ago
University of Dhaka	Niaz Ahmed Khan	27 August 2024; 22 months ago
University of Frontier Technology, Bangladesh	Mohammad Mahfuzul Islam	20 November 2022; 3 years ago
University of Liberal Arts Bangladesh	Imran Rahman	2 November 2021; 4 years ago
University of Rajshahi	Saleh Hasan Naqib	5 September 2024; 21 months ago
University of Scholars	Enamul Bashar	23 December 2023; 2 years ago
University of Science and Technology Chittagong	Mohammad Solaiman	22 May 2017; 9 years ago
Uttara University	M Azizur Rahman	25 February 2015; 11 years ago
World University of Bangladesh	Abdul Mannan Choudhury	2003; 23 years ago
