= Maqsud =

Maqsud (also spelled Maqsood and Maksud) (مقصود) is a given name of Arabic origin. Notable people with the name include:

- Maqsood Ahmed (1925–1999), Pakistani cricketer
- Sayed Maqsood Hashemi (born 1984), Afghan footballer
- Maqsood Hussain (field hockey) (born 1962), Pakistani field hockey player
- Maqsood Rana (born 1972), Pakistani cricketer
- Ala Abdel Maqsud Muhammad Salim (born 1967), citizen of Egypt who was held in extrajudicial detention in Guantanamo Bay
- Maqsud Shah (1864–1930), Uyghur Khan or Prince of the Kumul Khanate from 1908 to 1930
- Maqsud-Ali Tabrizi, Iranian physician
- Maqsudullah (1883–1961), Bengali Islamic scholar
- Md. Maksud Helali, vice-chancellor of Khulna University of Engineering & Technology, Bangladesh
- A. S. Mohammad Maksud Kamal, 29th Vice-Chancellor of the University of Dhaka, Bangladesh
- Maksud Hossain, Bangladeshi writer, director, and producer
- Maksud Sadikov (1963–2011), Dagestani professor in international relations and Islamic economics
- Maksud Alikhanov-Avarsky (1846–1907), Dagestani military general
- Maksud Syundyukle (1904–1981), Tatar and Bashkir peot
- Maksud Ibragimov (born 1977), Tajik politician
- Maksud Karimov (born 1985), Uzbek footballer
- Maqsud Mahsudov (born 2007), Azerbaijani gymnast

== Abul Maqsud ==
- Abul Maqsud Harun-ar-Rashid (1933–2021), Bangladeshi physicist
- Syed Abul Maksud (1946–2021), Bangladeshi journalist, columnist, research scholar, essayist, and writer
