= Payer Ahmed =

Bangladeshi Academic; CSTU VC

- অধ্যাপক ড. পেয়ার আহম্মেদ

Second Vice Chancellor

Chandpur Science and Technology University
- Incumbent
- Assumed office 9 November 2024
- Preceded by: Nasim Akhtar

Personal details
- Education: University of Chittagong; Yamagata University, Japan
- Occupation: Professor, university administrator

Payer Ahmed a Bangladeshi mathematician. He is Professor of Mathematics at Jagannath University and the second person to hold the position of vice-chancellor of Chandpur Science and Technology University.

== Education Life ==
Payar received his bachelor's and master's degrees in mathematics from the University of Chittagong. He earned his PhD from Yamagata University, Japan.

== Career ==
Payer Ahmed started teaching in 1993 by joining the BCS Education Cadre. Later, he joined the Department of Mathematics of Jagannath University and was promoted to the position of professor of that department in 2012. Apart from Jagannath University, he has taught at several universities in the country and abroad. In addition to teaching, he has held various important positions including syndicate member, academic council member, and dean of the Faculty of Science of Jagannath University. He has published more than 40 research papers in domestic and foreign journals. On 7 November 2024, he was appointed as the second vice-chancellor of Chandpur Science and Technology University and formally assumed office on 9 November.
