= Nasim Akhtar =

Nasim Akhtar may refer to:

- Nasim Akhtar Chaudhry, Pakistani politician
- Nasim Akhtar (professor) (born 1973), vice chancellor of Chandpur Science and Technology University
