= ABM Rashedul Hassan =

Bangladeshi academic and administrator

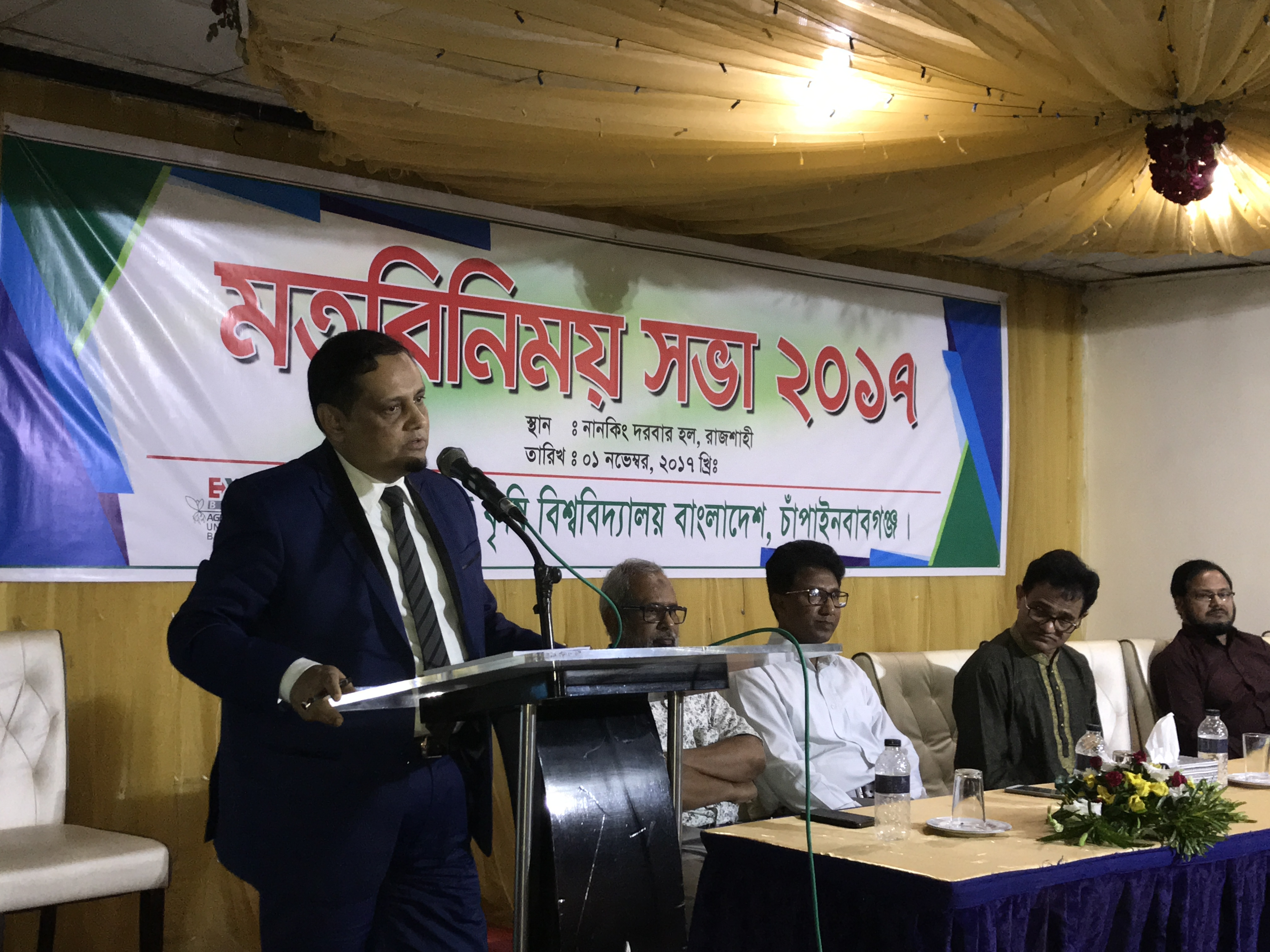
- Vice Chancellor ABM Rashedul Hasan delivering a Speech among College Teachers in 2017

Vice-chancellor

Exim Bank Agricultural University
- Incumbent
- Assumed office 1 September 2022
- Preceded by: Md Habibur Rahman Akon

Personal details
- Education: University of Dhaka Lincoln University College, Malaysia
- Occupation: Professor, university administrator

ABM Rashedul Hassan is a Bangladeshi academic and vice-chancellor of the Exim Bank Agricultural University. He worked as a counselor at the Bangladesh Institute of Management. He is a former treasurer of North South University. He is the former registrar and treasurer of Atish Dipankar University of Science and Technology.

== Early life ==
Hassan's father, Abul Basher, was the founding principal of Azam Khan Government Commerce College in Khulna. His mother, Rokeya Begum, was a professor of Govt. Pioneer Girl's College, Khulna. He did his bachelor's and master's in management at the University of Dhaka. He did his Doctor of Business Administration at Lincoln University College, Malaysia.

== Career ==
Hassan joined MIDAS Financing Limited as a program officer in 1991. He then went to work for ANZ Grindlays Bank and Bangladesh Institute of Management.

Hassan was the first secretary of the labor wing of the Bangladesh High Commission to Malaysia. He was a professor of the business school in Atish Dipankar University of Science and Technology. In 2009, he was the registrar of Atish Dipankar University of Science and Technology. He had served as the treasurer of Atish Dipankar University of Science and Technology in 2013. He was the treasurer of North South University in 2021–2022.

Hassan was appointed vice-chancellor of the Exim Bank Agricultural University in September 2022. He is a director of International American Council for Research & Development. He is a fellow of the Indian Academic Research's Association. He is the president of the Bangladesh wing of Indian Academic Research's Association. He is the chairman of the MOVE Foundation.
