= Eaysmin Ara Lekha =

Bangladeshi academic

Eaysmin Ara Lekha is a Bangladeshi academic and Vice-Chancellor of Uttara University. She is the former pro-vice-chancellor of Uttara University.

== Early life ==
Lekha's mother was Sabira Rouf (d. 2023). She did her bachelor's degree in 1992 and her master's in Bengali Literature and Linguistics in 1995 from the University of Dhaka. She completed her PhD at Jadavpur University in Linguistics.

== Career ==
Lekha was the founding vice-chairperson of Uttara University, established in 2003.

Lekha was the dean of the School of Education and Physical of Uttara University. In April 2022, she was appointed Pro-Vice-Chancellor of Uttara University. She is a member of the advisory board of Bangladesh Society for Private University Academics.

Lekha was appointed Vice-Chancellor of Uttara University in April 2023. She received the Bishwa Manav Shiksha Award by the Jangipur Manav Shiksha Research and Training Institute. She saw the appointment of Dr Gour Gobinda Goswami as pro-vice-chancellor of Uttara University under her.

== Personal life ==
Lekha is married to M. Azizur Rahman, former Vice-Chancellor of Uttara University.
