= Mohammad Abdur Rashid =

Mohammad Abdur Rashid may refer to:

- M. A. Rashid (1919–1981), Bangladeshi educator
- Mohammad Abdur Rashid (academic), Bangladeshi academic
- Mohammad Abdur Rashid (judge) (1942–2023), Bangladeshi judge
- Muhammad Rashid (field hockey, born 1941), Pakistani field hockey player incorrectly referred to in some sources as "Muhammad Abdul Rashid"
