= M. Feroze Ahmed =

Bangladeshi academic

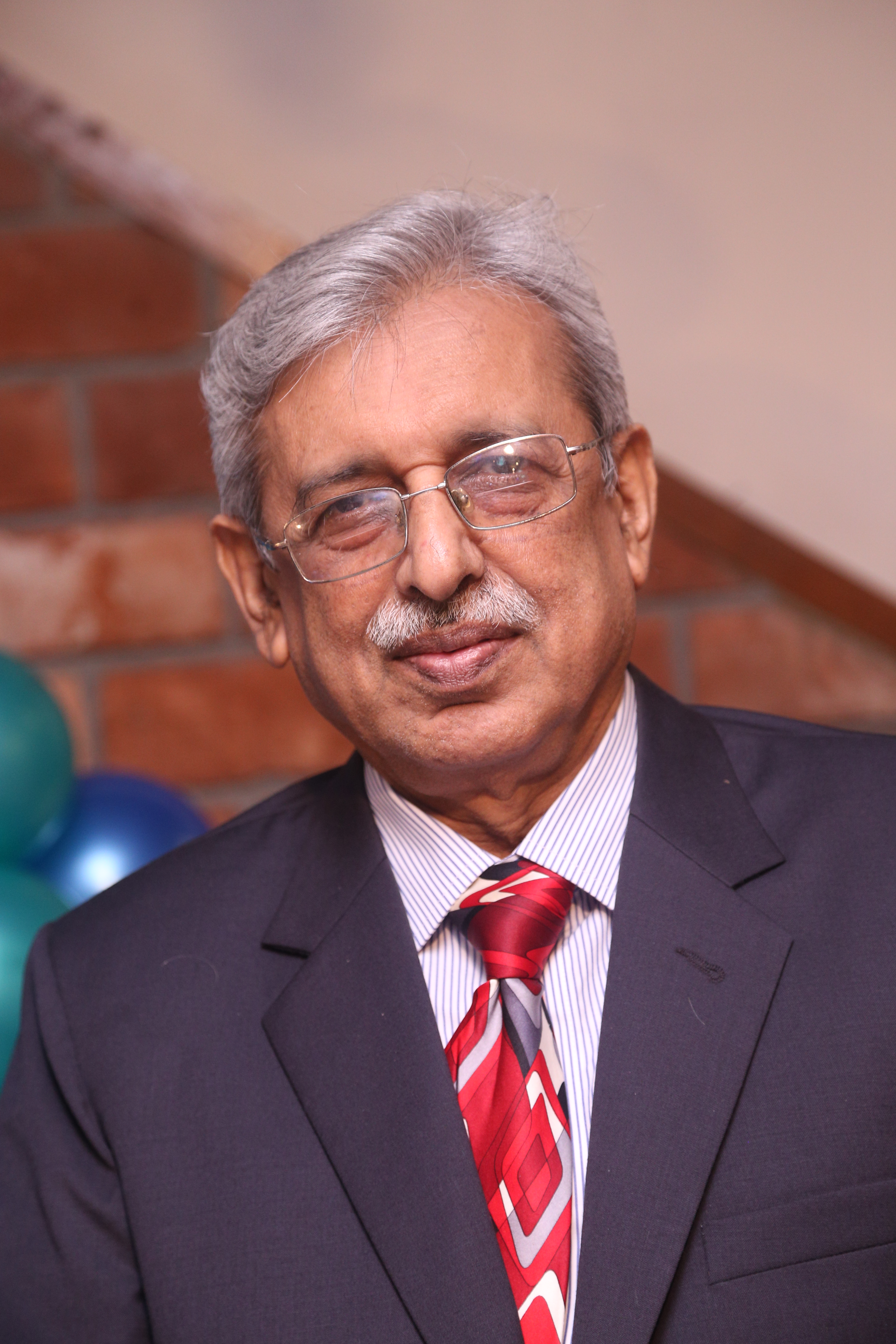
- Ahmed in 2015

Vice-Chancellor of Stamford University Bangladesh
- In office 2012 – 7 August 2017
- Succeeded by: Ali Naqi

Personal details
- Born: 31 December 1945 (age 80) Gopalgonj, Bengal Presidency, British India
- Education: Bangladesh University of Engineering and Technology; University of Strathclyde
- Occupation: Academic, civil engineer, scientist
- Known for: Teaching, scientific research, civil and environmental engineering
- Website: teacher.buet.ac.bd/fahmed

M. Feroze Ahmed (born 31 December 1945) is a Bangladeshi academic, civil engineer and scientist. He is the former vice-chancellor of Stamford University Bangladesh.

== Education ==
Passed Matriculation Examination from Ulpur P.C. High School, Gopalganj in 1962 and Intermediate (Science) Examination from Rajendra College Faridpur in 1964. He graduated in civil engineering from Bangladesh University of Engineering and Technology (BUET), Dhaka in 1968. He earned his MSc in civil engineering degree with specialization in environmental engineering from BUET and PhD degree from University of Strathclyde, Glasgow, UK.

== Work experience ==
He joined as a lecturer in civil engineering at BUET in 1969 and then promoted to the positions of assistant professor in 1974, associate professor in 1977 and professor in 1986. He was head of the Civil Engineering Department and dean of the Civil Engineering Faculty at Bangladesh University of Engineering and Technology(BUET), Dhaka. He was also vice chairman and chairman, Dhaka WASA Board and a visiting professor, University of Strathclyde, Glasgow, UK. He retired from BUET in 2011 and joined the Stamford University Bangladesh as Dean, Faculty of Engineering in 2012 and worked as vice-chancellor of the university for one term(2013-2017). Presently he is working as emeritus professor of Stamford University Bangladesh.

As a professional engineer he worked as a consultant to about 20 projects of high national importance. He was one of the pioneers of high rise construction in Bangladesh. Ahmed worked as a member of the International Panel of Expert for the Construction of Bangabandhu Bridge (Jamuna Bridge), the largest infrastructure development project in Bangladesh and presently working as a member, Panel of Experts, Padma Multipurpose Bridge Project.

== Research and publication ==
He has about 160 publications in his credit having over 7000 Google Scholar citations of his works. He authored and edited 20 books and proceeding held in 152 libraries worldwide. He is a contributor to most extensively used ‘Guidelines for Drinking-water Quality’ 4th Edition published by the World Health Organization and ‘Towards a More Effective Operational Response – Arsenic Contamination of Groundwater in South and East Asian Countries’, Vol.2, Technical Report published by the World Bank and a few chapters in books published by globally reputed publishers. His research work in collaboration with MIT (US) resulted in a breakthrough in understanding the mechanism of arsenic contamination of groundwater.

== Professional membership ==
- Fellow, Bangladesh Academy of Sciences (BAS);
- Fellow, Institution of Engineers, Bangladesh (IEB);
- Member, American Society of Civil Engineers (ASCE);
- Member, Bangladesh Association for Advancement of Science (BAAS);
- Member, National Oceanographic and Maritime Institute (NOAMI);
- Indian Association of Environmental Management (IAEM).

== Awards and recognition ==
- BUET (Dr. Rashid Memorial) Gold Medal, 1998 in recognition of his excellence in teaching and research;
- Institution of Engineers Bangladesh (IEB) Medal, 2004 for contribution to nation and engineering profession;
- Bangladesh Academy of Science (Dr. M. O. Ghani Memorial) Gold Medal, 2007 for contribution to advancement of science and technology;
- He was the first BUET Coordinator of BUET-MIT research Group, which received the Prince Sultan Bin Abdul Aziz Prize for Water for solving the puzzle of Arsenic Contamination of Groundwater.
