= M. Abul Kashem =

Bangladeshi academic

- মু. আবুল কাসেম

1st Vice-Chancellor of Teesta University
- Incumbent
- Assumed office 17 December 2023

Vice-Chancellor of Hajee Mohammad Danesh Science & Technology University
- In office 2 February 2017 – 1 February 2021

Personal details
- Born: 1953 (age 72–73) Rangpur, East Bengal, Dominion of Pakistan
- Education: Bangladesh Agricultural University (B.Sc.Ag., M.Sc.Ag); University of Reading (PhD)

M. Abul Kashem (born June 1953) is a Bangladeshi academic and the current Vice-chancellor of Teesta University. He is former vice-chancellor of Hajee Mohammad Danesh Science & Technology University.

Kashem was the head of the Department of Agricultural Extension Education and Language at the Bangladesh Agricultural University and also served as the director of the Agricultural Extension Center, Agricultural Museum, Institutional Quality Assurance Cell. He is the former president of the Bangladesh Agricultural Society.

== Early life and education ==
Kashem was born in 1953 in Araji Sheikh Sundar village of Barakhata Union, Hatibandha Upazila, Rangpur District, East Pakistan. He graduated from Baura Public High School and Rangpur Government College in 1968 and 1970 respectively. He earned his bachelor's degree in agriculture in 1974 and master's degree in agriculture in 1985 from Bangladesh Agricultural University. He earned his PhD in 1986 from University of Reading in the United Kingdom.

== Career ==
Kashem was the editor of the Bangladesh Journal of Extension for 4 years and the editor of the Progressive Agriculturalist Journal for 2 years.

In February 2017, Kashem was appointed vice-chancellor of Hajee Mohammad Danesh Science and Technology University. He served till January 2021. He had to flee the campus in face of student protests. Bangladesh's first specialised mobile veterinary clinic was launched by Hajee Mohammad Danesh Science & Technology University was inaugurated by Kashem.

On 25 November 2023, Kashem was appointed the first vice-chancellor of Teesta University, the first private university in Rangpur Division.
