= Sekul Islam =

Bangladeshi educationist (1949–2021)

- Sekul Islam

Vice-Chancellor

Atish Dipankar University of Science and Technology
- In office 1 August 2017 – 21 July 2021
- Preceded by: Nazrul Islam Khan
- Succeeded by: Md Zahangir Alam

Personal details
- Born: 1949 Chandpur, Tippera District, East Bengal, Pakistan
- Died: 21 July 2021 (aged 71–72) Dhaka, Bangladesh
- Education: University of Dhaka; TU Wien
- Occupation: Academician, University Administrator

Md. Sekul Islam (Bengali: সেকুল ইসলাম; 1949 – 21 July 2021) was a Bangladeshi educationist. He was a professor in the Department of Electrical and Electronic Engineering at University of Dhaka and former Vice Chancellor of Atish Dipankar University of Science and Technology.

== Early life ==
Md. Sekul Islam was born in 1949 into an aristocratic Dewan family in the village of West Baishpur in Matlab South Upazila of Chandpur District, Bangladesh.

== Education ==
Sekul Islam was a student of Department of Applied Physics, Electronics and Communication Engineering. He holds a master's degree from Dhaka University. He received his PhD in 1994 from the Vienna University of Technology.

== Career ==
Sekul Islam joined Dhaka University in 1974 as a lecturer. In addition to being assistant professor, associate professor and selection grade professor in the department, he participated on behalf of the blue team in the 2012 DU Syndicate election. Since retiring from Dhaka University in 2016, he has been teaching at ADUST.

During his career he held various important positions including Director of Energy Institute of Dhaka University, Dean of Faculty of Engineering and Technology, Head of department, Member of Professors Recruitment Board of several Universities, Member of Syndicate and Academic Council.

Sekul Islam joined ADUST on 1 August 2017 as the Vice Chancellor.

== Research work and publications ==
He has published a significant number of research articles in national and international journals. He is also the author of three textbooks.

== Death ==
Sekul Islam died on 21 July 2021 at BSMMU in Dhaka due to cardiac arrest.
