= M. Afzal Hossain =

Bangladeshi academic and scientist

- Born: 30 November 1952 (age 73); Bogra, East Bengal, Dominion of Pakistan
- Occupations: Scientist, academic

M. Afzal Hossain (born 30 November 1952) is a Bangladeshi academic and scientist in the field of agriculture and biochemistry. He has been serving as vice-chancellor of Hajee Mohammad Danesh Science & Technology University, Dinajpur, since September 2008. In 1998, he was awarded an invitation fellowship from Japan Society for the Promotion of Science (JSPS) to serve as a visiting professor at Hokkaido University, Japan.

== Biography ==
=== Early life ===
Hossain was born on 30 November 1952 in Majbari village, Shariakandi of Bogra District to Sabder Rahman and Jamila Khatoon. He obtained B.Sc. A.H. (Hons.) majoring in dairy science and M.Sc. A.H. in biochemistry from Bangladesh Agricultural University securing first class in both the cases.

== Academic career ==
Hossain joined as research associate in 1977 and after as lecturer of biochemistry at BAU in 1978. He was promoted to the rank of assistant professor in 1980. He obtained his PhD degree from National Dairy Research Institute, Haryana, India in 1984 and was promoted to the rank of associate professor in 1986. He was selected for a USAID fellowship and performed postdoctoral research from the Department of Food Science and Nutrition, the University of Hawaii in the United States in 1987. He was promoted to the rank of professor in 1992.

Hossain published his fundamental research papers in several peer-reviewed international and national journals and hence selected for the FAOB fellowship to participate 7th FAOB conference in Malaysia in 1987. Furthermore, he was selected for the European Economic Community postdoctoral fellowship and worked for one year in the Institute of Cellular and Molecular Pathology, Brussels, Belgium in 1992.

Hossain also served as the head of the department of biochemistry for two tenures. He had an ample opportunity to interact with eminent scientists at national and international levels. He participated and presented his research findings at many forums. In this connection, he visited several leading educational and research institutes in different countries of the world. Based on his academic and research potentiality at molecular level he was honoured to avail Jawaharlal Nehru Centre for Advanced Scientific Research-Committee on Science and Technology in Developing Countries Fellowship in 1997 to work as a visiting scientist for three months in Central Food Technological Research Institute, India.

In 1998, Hossain was awarded an Invitation Fellowship from Japan Society for the Promotion of Science (JSPS) to serve as a visiting professor at Hokkaido University, Japan. His background in molecular biology and research enabled him to direct multiple research projects. Under his supervision, numerous students completed their master's and doctoral degrees. He has also participated in professional activities nationally and internationally.

== Academic achievement at a glance ==
- Emeritus professor and adviser, Pundra University of Science and Technology,
- President, Helping Organisation for Promising and Energetic Students ( HOPES ) and Fellow, Bangladesh Academy of Agriculture
- Former adviser, board of trustees, Pundra University of Science and Technology
- Former vice chancellor, Pundra University of Science and Technology,
- Former dean, Faculty of Agriculture, Bangladesh Agricultural University (BAU),
- Former vice chancellor (In charge), BAU
- Former vice chancellor, Hajee Muhammad Danesh Science and Technology (HSTU),
- Former dean (In charge), Faculty of Fisheries, HSTU, former head, Biochemistry, Department of biochemistry, HSTU
- Former professor, Department of Biochemistry and Molecular Biology, BAU,
- Former head, Department of Biochemistry and Molecular Biology, BAU,
- Former president, Bangladesh Japan Society for Promotion of Science Alumni Association,
- Former senior vice president, Bangladesh Association for the Advancement of Sciences ( BAAS ),
- Former president, Section vi, BAAS,
- Former president, secretary, section vi, BAAS,
- Former invited fellow, JSPS,
- Former Bridge Fellow, JSPS,
- Former fellow, Federation of Asian and Oceanian Biochemists (FAOB ),
- Former postdoctoral fellow, European Economic Community ( EEC ),
- Former postdoctoral fellow, USAID,
- Former vsiting fellow, JNCASAR.
- UGC Bangabandhu Sheikh Mujib Fellow -2021

== Academic institutions attended ==
- Iwate University, Japan,
- Hokkaido University, Japan,
- Central Food Technological Research Institute ( CFTRI ), India,
- International Institute of Cellular and Molecular Pathology, Belgium,
- University of Hawaai, USA
- National Dairy Research Institute, India,
- Bangladesh Agricultural University,
- Shicharpara buljan High School, Bogura, Bangladesh
- Gamir Uddin Upgrade School, Bogura, Bangladesh
- Harina Primary School, Bogura, Bangladesh
