= Mohammad Ali Naqi =

Bangladeshi architect

Vice-Chancellor of Stamford University Bangladesh
- Incumbent
- Assumed office 7 August 2017
- Preceded by: M. Feroze Ahmed

Personal details
- Education: Bangladesh University of Engineering and Technology

Mohammad Ali Naqi is a Bangladeshi architect and the current Vice-Chancellor of Stamford University Bangladesh.

== Education ==
Naqi passed his SSC and HSC in 1980 and 1982 subsequently. He completed his bachelor's in 1989 and masters in 2004 from Bangladesh University of Engineering and Technology.

== Career ==
Naqi started his career as a lecturer at Khulna University in 1991 and went on to become the head of the department. In 2006, he joined Stamford University Bangladesh as the chair of the Department of Architecture.
