= Chandpur Science and Technology University =

Bangladeshi University

Chandpur Science & Technology University
- চাঁদপুর বিজ্ঞান ও প্রযুক্তি বিশ্ববিদ্যালয়
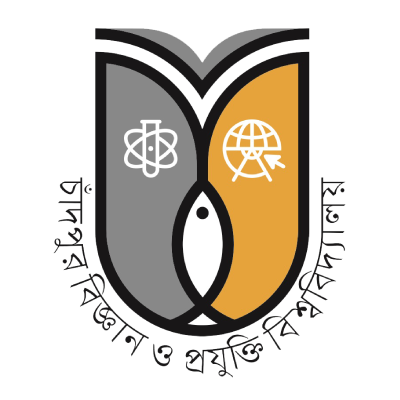
- Type: Public University
- Established: 2021; 5 years ago
- Affiliations: University Grants Commission
- Chancellor: President Mohammed Shahabuddin
- Vice-Chancellor: Professor Dr. M. Atiqur Rahman
- Pro Vice-Chancellor: Professor Dr. Mohammad Lokman Hossain
- Location: Chandpur Temporary Campus Address : Holding No: 0937-02, Kholishaduli, Wapda Gate, Cumilla Road, Chandpur Sadar, Chandpur-3600, Bangladesh
- Campus: Urban 60 acres (24 ha)
- Website: cstu.ac.bd

Chandpur Science & Technology University (Bengali: চাঁদপুর বিজ্ঞান ও প্রযুক্তি বিশ্ববিদ্যালয়) is a public university of Bangladesh. It was established in 2021 by the Parliament of Bangladesh act 2019.

== History ==
The cabinet approved the draft bill Chandpur Science and Technology University (CSTU) Act 2019 on 23 December 2019. The bill to establish Chandpur University of Science and Technology (CSTU) was passed in the parliament on 9 September 2020. In January 2022, reports surfaced that between December 2019, when the university was approved by the cabinet, and April 2021. Permanent campus of this university is under construction in Lakkhipur Union of Chandpur Sadar. Now its academic activities are going on in a temporary campus located in Wapda Gate, Mothkhola, Comilla Road, Chandpur-3600.

== List of vice-chancellors ==
Sequence	Name	Began in office	Left office
1	Professor Dr. Md. Nasim Akhtar	25 January 2021	8 October 2024
2	Professor Dr. Payer Ahmed	9 November 2024	22 July 2026
2	Professor Dr. M. Atiqur Rahman	22 July 2026	Present

== List of pro vice-chancellors ==
Sequence	Name	Began in office	Left office
1	Professor Dr. Mohammad Lokman Hossain	22 July 2026	Present

== Faculties ==
- Faculty of Science and Engineering
  - Department of Computer Science and Engineering (CSE)
  - Department of Information and Communication Technology (ICT)
  - Department of Electrical and Electronics Engineering (EEE)(Proposed)
  - Department of Naval Architecture and Marine Engineering (NME)(Proposed)
  - Department of Textile Engineering (TE)(Proposed)
  - Department of Civil Engineering (CE)(Proposed)
  - Department of Mechanical Engineering (ME)(Proposed)
  - Department of Georesource Engineering (GE)(Proposed)
  - Department of Architecture (Arc.)(Proposed)
- Faculty of Business Studies
  - Department of Business Administration (DBA)

== Departments ==
- Department of Computer Science and Engineering (CSE)
  - Program Offering: B.Sc. Engineering in Computer Science and Engineering
- Department of Information and Communication Technology (ICT)
  - Program Offering: B.Sc. Engineering in Information and Communication Technology
- Department of Business Administration (DBA)
  - Program Offering: Bachelor of Business Administration

== Offices ==
- Office of the Vice Chancellor
- Office of the Pro Vice Chancellor
- Office of the Registrar
- Office of the Controller of Examination
- Office of the Proctor
- Office of the Chief Engineer
- Office of the Librarian
- Office of the Director of Finance and Accounts
- Office of the Director of Planning and Development
- Office of the Director of Public Relation and Information
- Office of the Director of Transport
- Office of the Director of Students Counselling and Guidance
- Office of the Director of Physical Education

== Cells ==
- ICT Cell
- Institutional Quality Assurance Cell (IQAC)
- International Collaboration Cell (ICC)

== Student life ==
Halls of residence

- Male Hall
- Female Hall
- Common Room (Female)

(There are facilities for female student here, including prayer, indoor games, rest and other necessary arrangements.)

- Library

Sports Facilities

- Indoor Games (Table Tennis, Carrom)
- Outdoor Games

== Library Facilities ==
Chandpur Science and Technology University (CSTU) has a relatively new library. However, the library is already quite well-equipped. It contains all the necessary academic books for the Engineering faculties (CSE and ICT) as well as the Business Administration department. Gradually, the library is becoming richer with books of various types and categories.

== Lab Facilities (For Engineering Faculties) ==
- Computer Lab
- Physics Lab
- Chemistry Lab
- EEE Lab

== Centres ==
- Research and Extension Centre
- Medical Centre

== Institute (As per CSTU website) ==
- Institute of Information and Communication Technology (Proposed)
- Institute of Modern Language (Proposed)
- Institute of Renewable Energy (Proposed)
- Institute of Appropriate Technology (Proposed)
- Institute of Georesource Energy (Proposed)

== Research Laboratory (As per CSTU website) ==
- Research Centre for Climate Change and Sustainability (Proposed)

== Undergrade Admission Process ==
The undergraduate admission of CSTU - Chandpur Science and Technology University is based on grades and examinations. After completion of Higher Secondary level (HSC) education, a student can submit his/her application for undergraduate admission if he/she fulfills the minimum requirements. To get admitted to the departments under the Engineering Faculty (Department of Computer Science and Engineering & Information and Communication Technology), a student must first pass the HSC examination with a good GPA and must be from the Science background. After that, the student has to take the cluster admission test, which is currently known as the GST (General, Science and Technology) admission test. In the cluster admission test, the student must appear in the Science unit.

Then the student has to apply to the universities that are part of the GST cluster. If the student gets a chance according to the central merit list or the separate merit lists published by the respective cluster universities, only then can the student finally get the opportunity to be admitted.

For admission to Chandpur Science and Technology University (CSTU), a student must obtain good grades in Physics, Chemistry, and Higher Mathematics in the HSC examination.
