= Zahangir Alam (chemist) =

Bangladeshi academic

Md Zahangir Alam
- জাহাঙ্গীর আলম
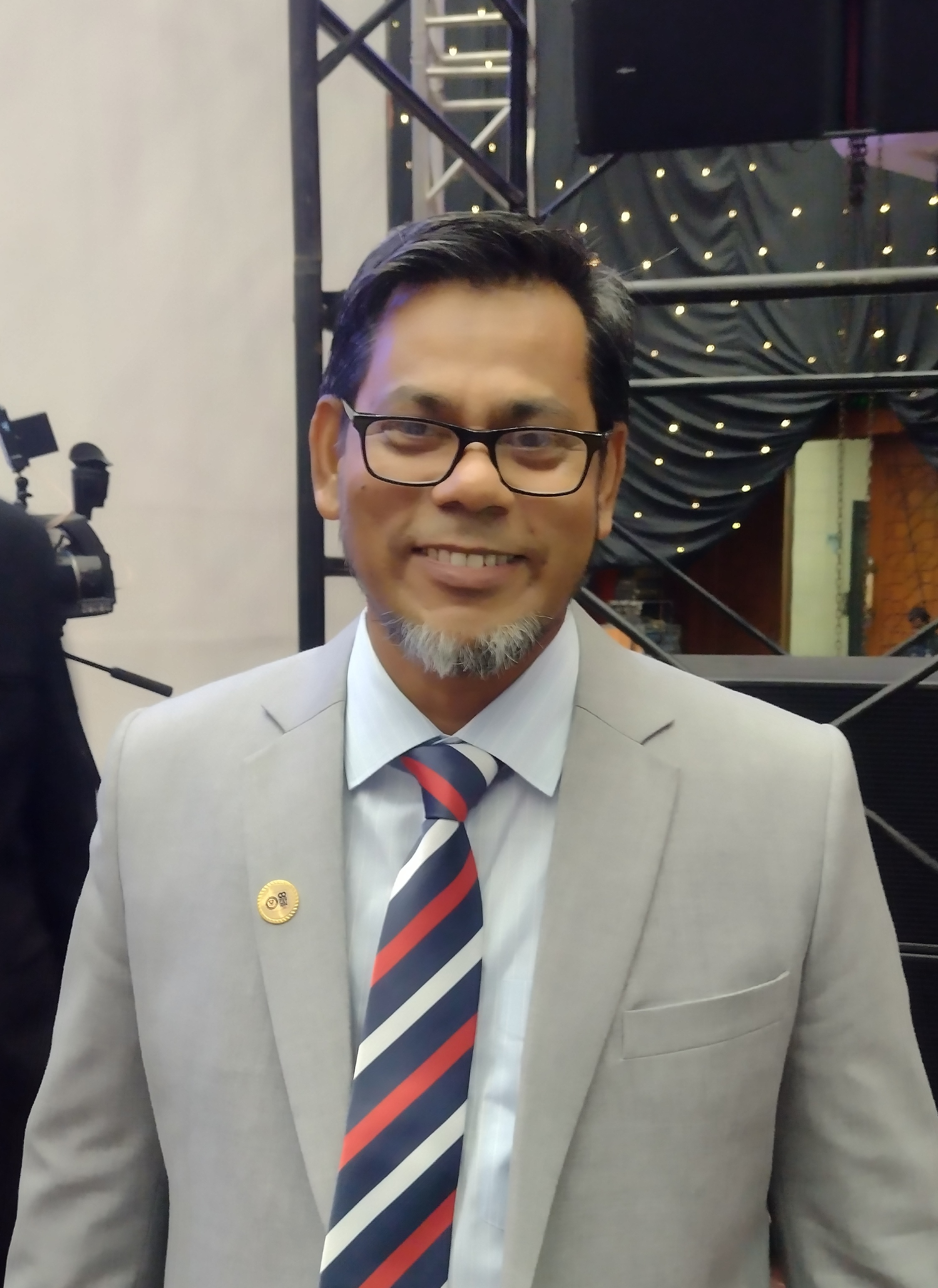

Vice-chancellor

Atish Dipankar University of Science and Technology
- Incumbent
- Assumed office 20 January 2022
- Preceded by: Sekul Islam

Personal details
- Education: University of Dhaka; Kumamoto University
- Occupation: Professor, university administrator

Md Zahangir Alam is a Bangladeshi academic and vice-chancellor of Atish Dipankar University of Science and Technology. He was a professor of the Department of Applied Chemistry and Chemical Technology at the University of Dhaka.

== Early life ==
Alam did his bachelor's degree and masters in applied chemistry and chemical technology at the University of Dhaka in 1995 and 1996 respectively. He did his PhD at the Kumamoto University in 2005.

== Career ==
Alam joined the University of Dhaka on 14 October 2000 as a lecturer.

In January 2007, Alam was a promoted to assistant professor. He was promoted to associate professor on 26 February 2011. He was promoted to full professor on 3 March 2014.

Alam was appointed vice-chancellor of Atish Dipankar University of Science and Technology in January 2022.
