= Barakhata Union =

Barakhata Union বড়খাতা ইউনিয়ন
- Location of Barakhata Union in Bangladesh
- Coordinates: 26.2057°N 89.1115°E
- Country: Bangladesh
- Division: Rangpur Division
- District: Lalmonirhat District
- Upazila: Hatibandha Upazila

Government
  - Type: Union Council
- Time zone: UTC+6 (BST)
- Website: barokhataup.lalmonirhat.gov.bd

Barakhata Union (Bengali: বড়খাতা ইউনিয়ন) is a union parishad of Hatibandha Upazila in Rangpur District and Rangpur Division, Bangladesh.
