= Hajee Mohammad Danesh Science & Technology University =

Public university in Bangladesh

Hajee Mohammad Danesh Science and Technology University
- হাজী মোহাম্মদ দানেশ বিজ্ঞান ও প্রযুক্তি বিশ্ববিদ্যালয়, দিনাজপুর
- Former name: List: Agricultural Extension Training Institute (1979-1988) Hajee Mohammad Danesh Agricultural College (1988-1999)
- Type: Public
- Established: 1979 as College 11 September 1999; 27 years ago as University
- Affiliations: University Grants Commission
- Chancellor: President Mirza Fakhrul Islam Alamgir
- Vice-Chancellor: Mohammed Enamullah
- Academic staff: 388
- Students: 11,203 (2023)
- Location: Dinajpur, Rangpur Division, Bangladesh; 25.6980°N 88.6550°E
- Campus: Suburban, 85 acres (34 ha)
- Language: English
Colors
Shuttle Grey, Deep Sky Blue, and Pigment Green
- Website: hstu.ac.bd

University rankings

Regional – Overall
- QS Asia: 1101-1200 (2026)

Hajee Mohammad Danesh Science and Technology University (HSTU) is a public university located in Dinajpur, Rangpur Division, Bangladesh. It is the first science and technology university in the northern part of the country. This university is named after prominent political leader and social activist Hajee Mohammad Danesh to honor his legacy as a champion of education, social progress, and rural development in northern Bangladesh.

== History ==
HSTU was established as an Agricultural Extension Training Institute (AETI) to award a three-year diploma in agriculture. The AETI was later upgraded to Hajee Mohammad Danesh Agricultural College in 1988 having an affiliation with the Bangladesh Agricultural University, Mymensingh. Then the college was upgraded to the status of a university and renamed as Hajee Mohammad Danesh Science and Technology University. The first batch of students was admitted for the 1999-2000 session. The Act of the university was passed on 8 July 2001 in the Jatio Shongsad (National Assembly) followed by a gazette notification on 8 April 2002.

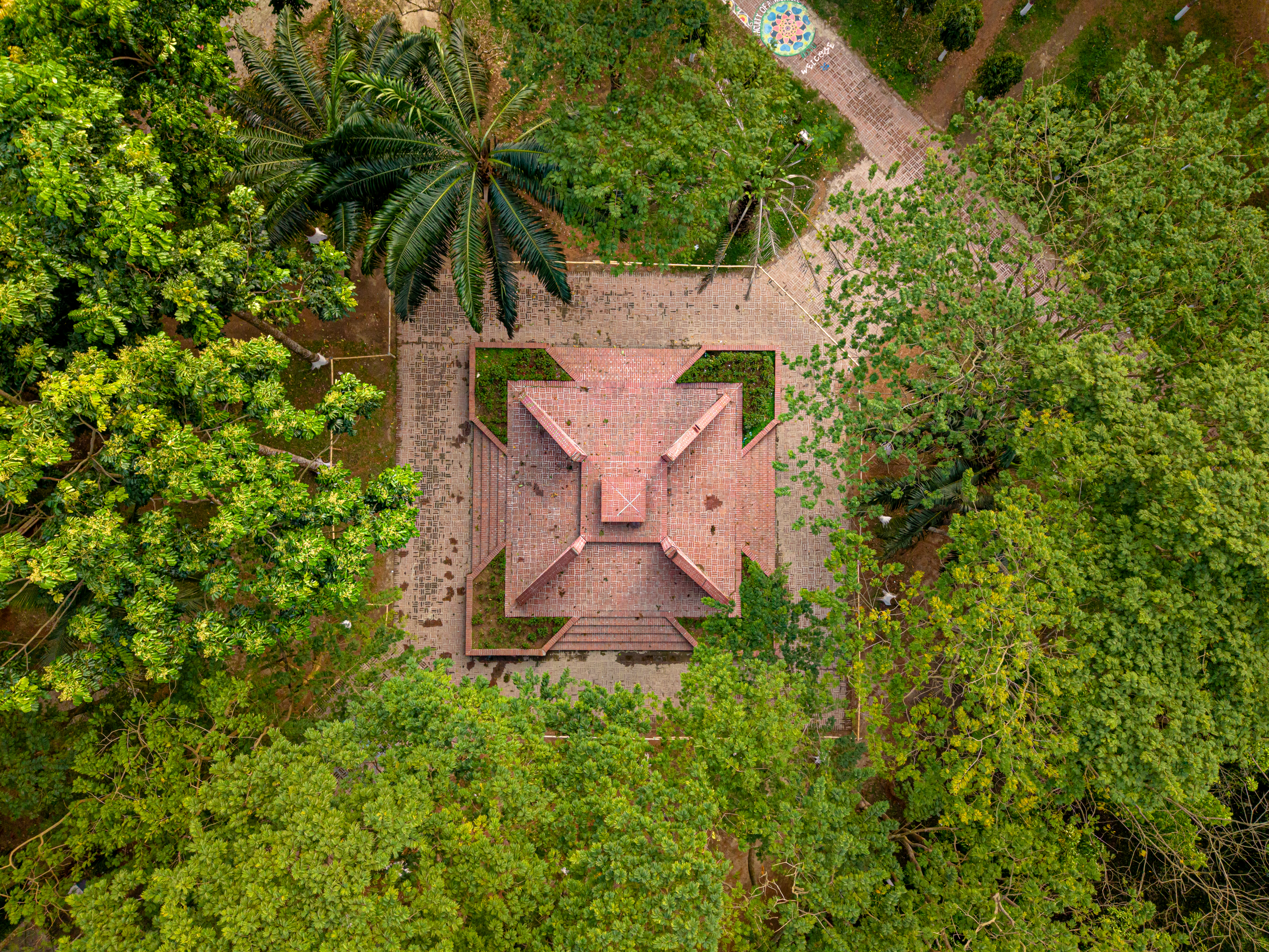
An aerial view of Saheed Minar at HSTU

== List of vice-chancellors ==
The following persons served as Vice Chancellor in Hajee Mohammad Danesh Science and Technology University:

| No. | Name | Term start | Term end |
|---|---|---|---|
| 1 | Musharraf Hossain Miah | 8 April 2002 | 30 August 2006 |
| 2 | Md. Motahar Hossain Mondol | 31 August 2006 | 21 April 2007 |
| 3 | Md. Ruhul Amin | 22 April 2007 | 2 September 2008 |
| 4 | M. Afzal Hossain | 3 September 2008 | 12 September 2012 |
| 5 | Md. Ruhul Amin | 27 September 2012 | 26 September 2016 |
| 6 | M. Abul Kashem | 2 February 2017 | 1 February 2021 |
| 7 | Bidhan Chandra Halder (Routine Duty) | 22 February 2021 | 29 June 2021 |
| 8 | M Kamruzzaman | 30 June 2021 | 10 August 2024 |
| 9 | Mohammed Enamullah | 22 October 2024 | Present |

== Faculties ==
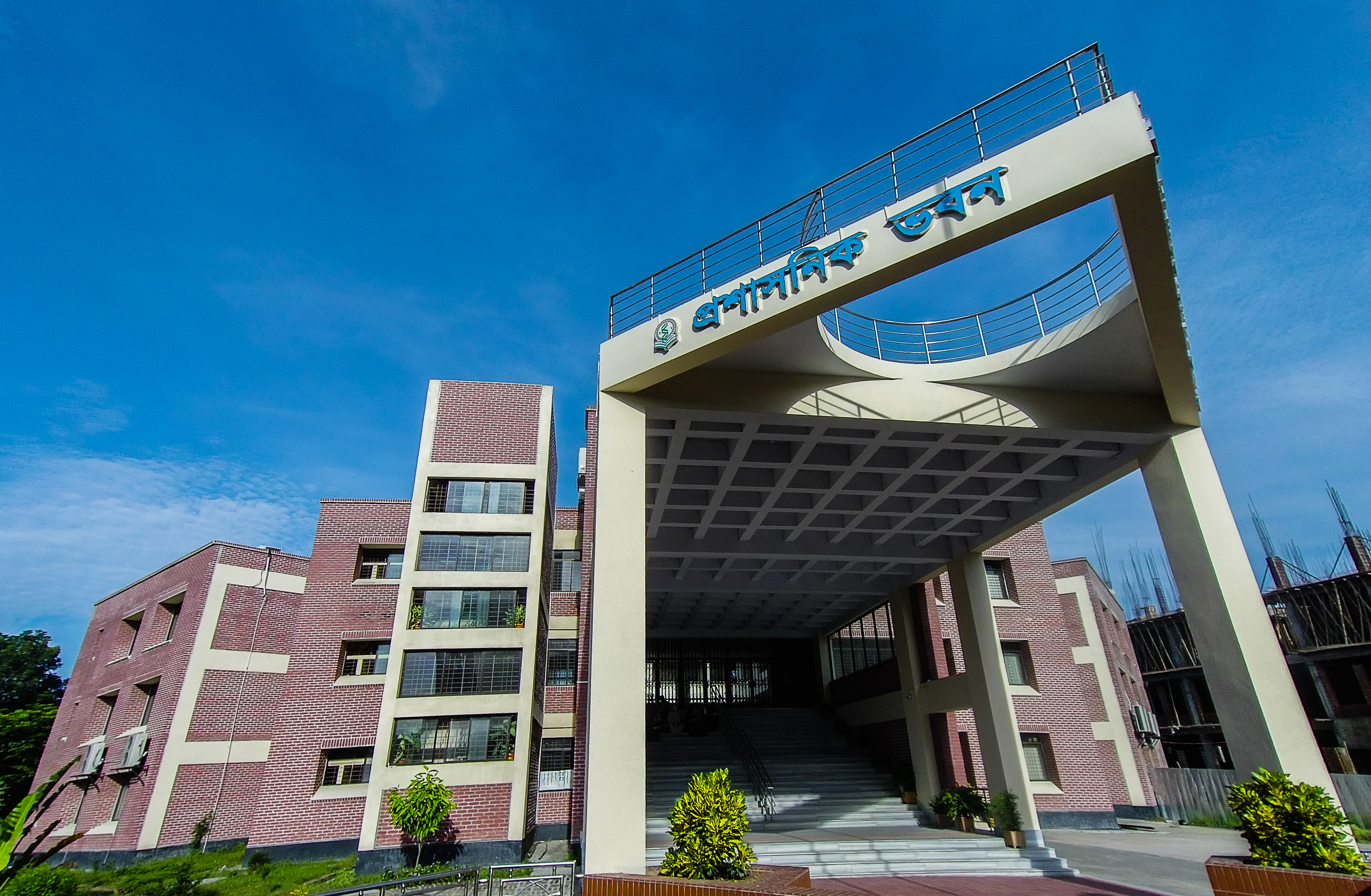

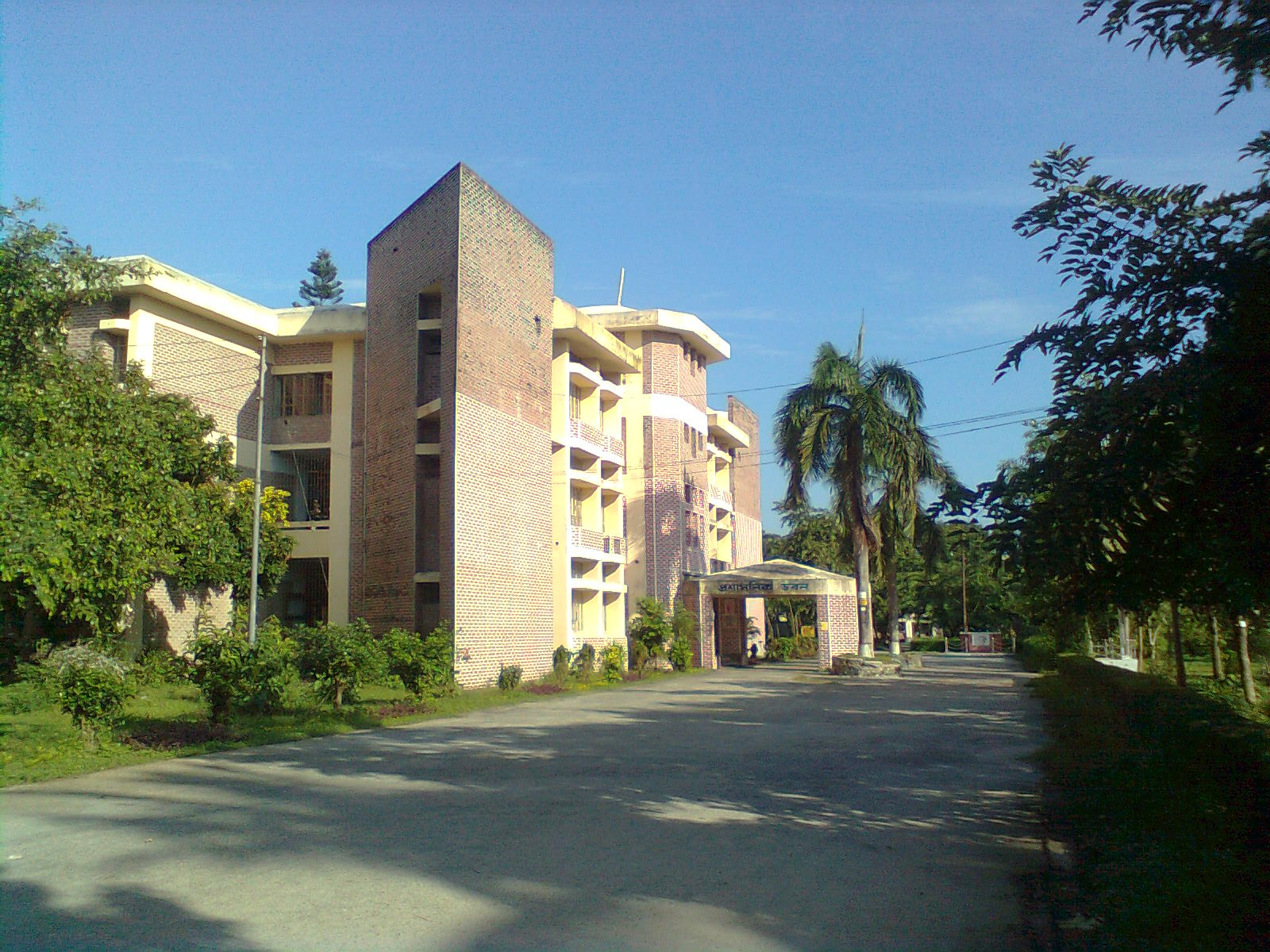
Side view of Agriculture building

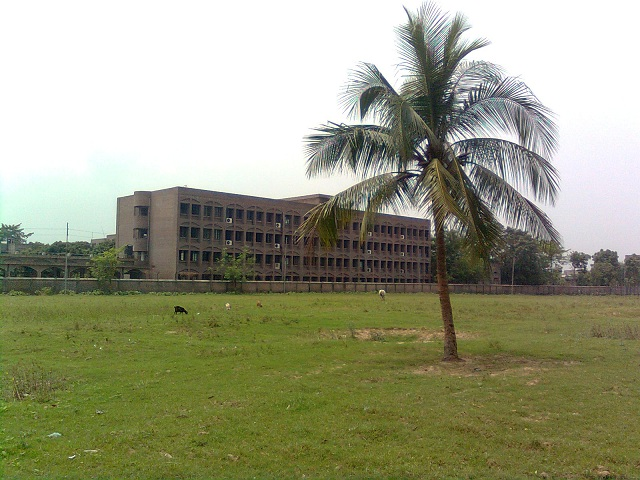
One of the academic buildings 3Veterinary Building

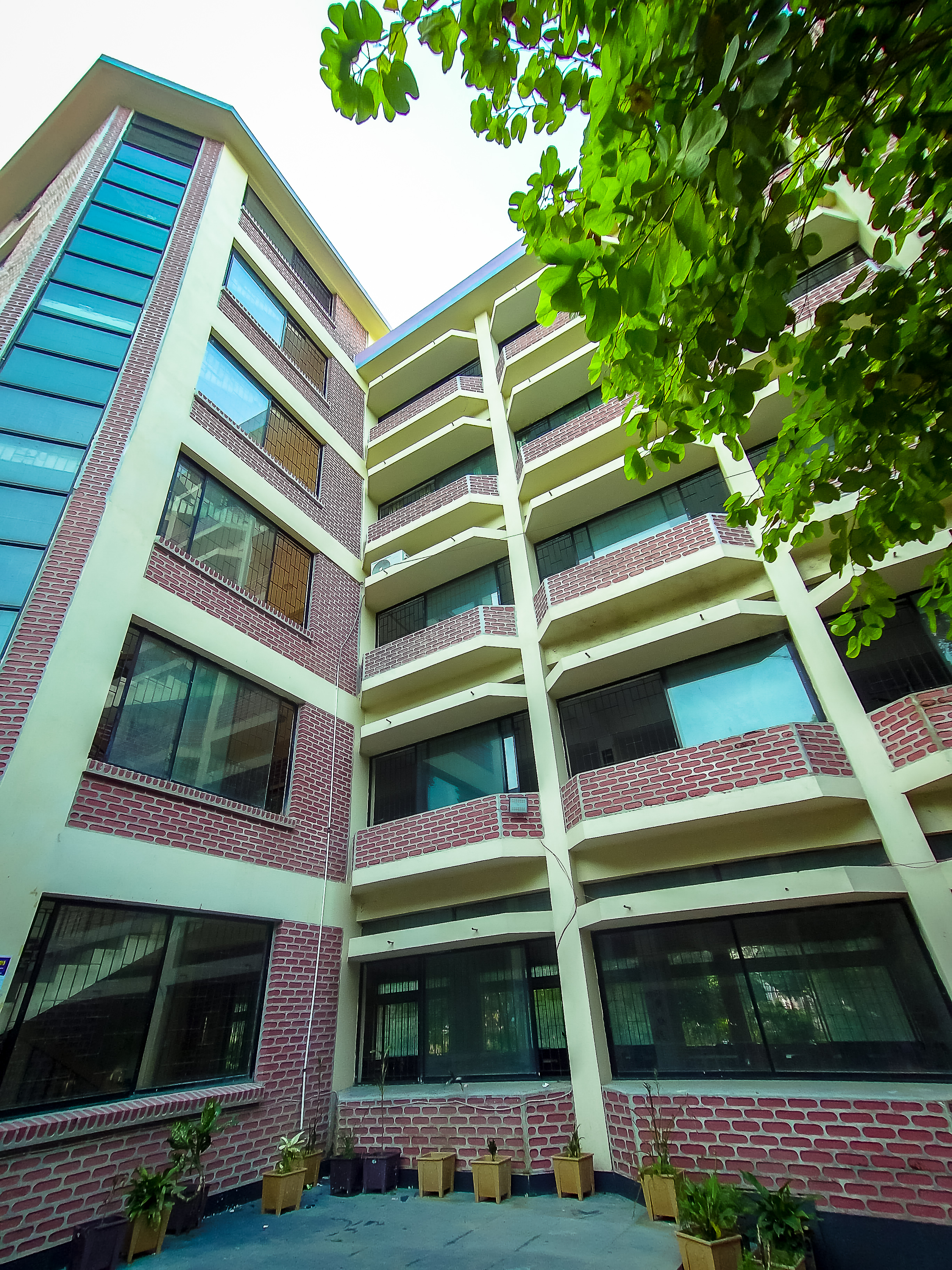

There are 9 faculties in HSTU with 45 departments:

1. Faculty of Postgraduate
2. Faculty of Agriculture
  - Department of Agronomy (AGN)
  - Department of Horticulture (HRT)
  - Department of Soil Science (SC)
  - Department of Entomology (ENT)
  - Department of Plant Pathology (PLP)
  - Department of Genetics and Plant Breeding (GPB)
  - Department of Crop Physiology and Ecology (CPE)
  - Department of Agricultural Extension (AEX)
  - Department of Agricultural Chemistry (ACH)
  - Department of Agroforestry and Environment (AGF)
  - Department of Biochemistry and Molecular Biology (BMB)
3. Faculty of Computer Science and Engineering
  - Department of Computer Science and Engineering (CSE)
  - Department of Electronics and Communication Engineering (ECE)
  - Department of Electrical and Electronic Engineering (EEE)
4. Faculty of Business Studies:
  - Department of Accounting (ACT)
  - Department of Management Studies (MGT)
  - Department of Marketing (MKT)
  - Department of Finance and Banking (FIB)
5. Faculty of Fisheries
  - Department of Fisheries Biology and Genetics (FBG)
  - Department of Fisheries Management (FMG)
  - Department of Fisheries Technology (FTL)
  - Department of Aquaculture (AQC)
6. Faculty of Veterinary & Animal Science
  - Department of Microbiology (MIC)
  - Department of Pathology and Parasitology (PPS)
  - Department of Dairy and Poultry Science (DPS)
  - Department of Anatomy and Histology (ANH)
  - Department of General Animal Science and Nutrition (GASN)
  - Department of Genetics and Animal Breeding (GAB)
  - Department of Medicine, Surgery and Obstetrics (MSO)
  - Department of Physiology and Pharmacology (PPH)
7. Faculty of Engineering
  - Department of Agricultural and Industrial Engineering (AIE)
  - Department of Food Processing and Preservation (FPP)
  - Department of Food Engineering and Technology (FET)
  - Department of Food Science and Nutrition (FSN)
  - Department of Architecture (ARCH)
  - Department of Civil Engineering (CE)
  - Department of Mechanical Engineering (ME)
8. Faculty of Science:
  - Department of Chemistry (CHE)
  - Department of Statistics (STAT)
  - Department of Mathematics (MAT)
  - Department of Physics (PHY)
9. Faculty of Social Science & Humanities
  - Department of English (ENG)
  - Department of Economics (ECN)
  - Department of Sociology (SOC)
  - Department of Development Studies (DS)

== Academics ==
=== Degrees offered ===
The university offers 23 undergraduate degrees under 9 faculties along with several postgraduate and doctoral courses.

==== Undergraduate degree programs ====
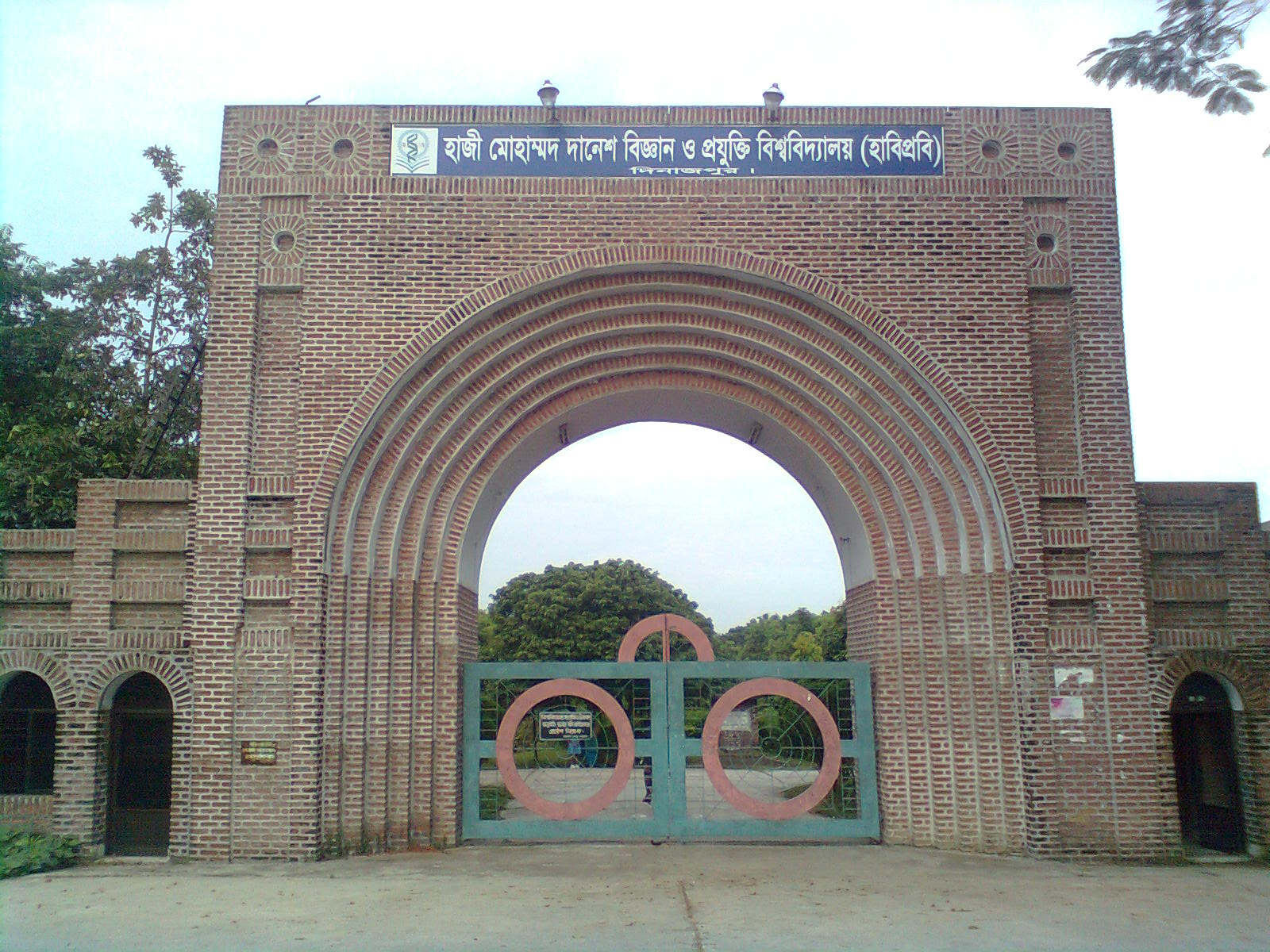
A gate of the university

There are 1795 seats available for undergraduate admission.

Undergraduate degrees offered by HSTU
| Faculty | Subject | Degree | Seat |
|---|---|---|---|
| Faculty of Agriculture | Agriculture | B.Sc. (Hons.) | 375 |
| Faculty of Computer Science and Engineering | Computer Science and Engineering | B.Sc. (Engineering) | 60 |
| Faculty of Computer Science and Engineering | Electronics and Communication Engineering | B.Sc.(Engineering) | 60 |
| Faculty of Computer Science and Engineering | Electrical and Electronic Engineering | B.Sc.(Engineering) | 60 |
| Faculty of Business Studies | Accounting | BBA | 70 |
| Faculty of Business Studies | Marketing | BBA | 70 |
| Faculty of Business Studies | Management | BBA | 70 |
| Faculty of Business Studies | Finance & Banking | BBA | 70 |
| Faculty of Fisheries | Fisheries | B.Sc.(Hons.) | 80 |
| Faculty of Veterinary and Animal Science | Veterinary medicine | DVM | 80 |
| Faculty of Engineering | Food and Process Engineering | B.Sc.(Engineering) | 60 |
| Faculty of Engineering | Agricultural Engineering | B.Sc.(Engineering) | 60 |
| Faculty of Engineering | Architecture | B.Arch. | 30 |
| Faculty of Engineering | Civil Engineering | B.Sc.(Engineering) | 50 |
| Faculty of Engineering | Mechanical Engineering | B.Sc.(Engineering) | 50 |
| Faculty of Science | Physics | B.Sc.(Hons.) | 75 |
| Faculty of Science | Chemistry | B.Sc.(Hons.) | 75 |
| Faculty of Science | Mathematics | B.Sc.(Hons.) | 80 |
| Faculty of Science | Statistics | B.Sc.(Hons.) | 80 |
| Faculty of Social Science & Humanities | English | BA | 70 |
| Faculty of Social Science & Humanities | Economics | BSS | 70 |
| Faculty of Social Science & Humanities | Sociology | BSS | 60 |
| Faculty of Social Science & Humanities | Development Studies | BSS | 40 |

=== Research ===
Three years of research under Md. Hasanuzzaman, chairman of the Genetics and Plant Breeding Department, led in 2014 to two new varieties of sweet pumpkins. The varieties, named "Hajee" and "Danesh", are higher yielding, sweeter, and have less fiber than other varieties grown in Bangladesh.

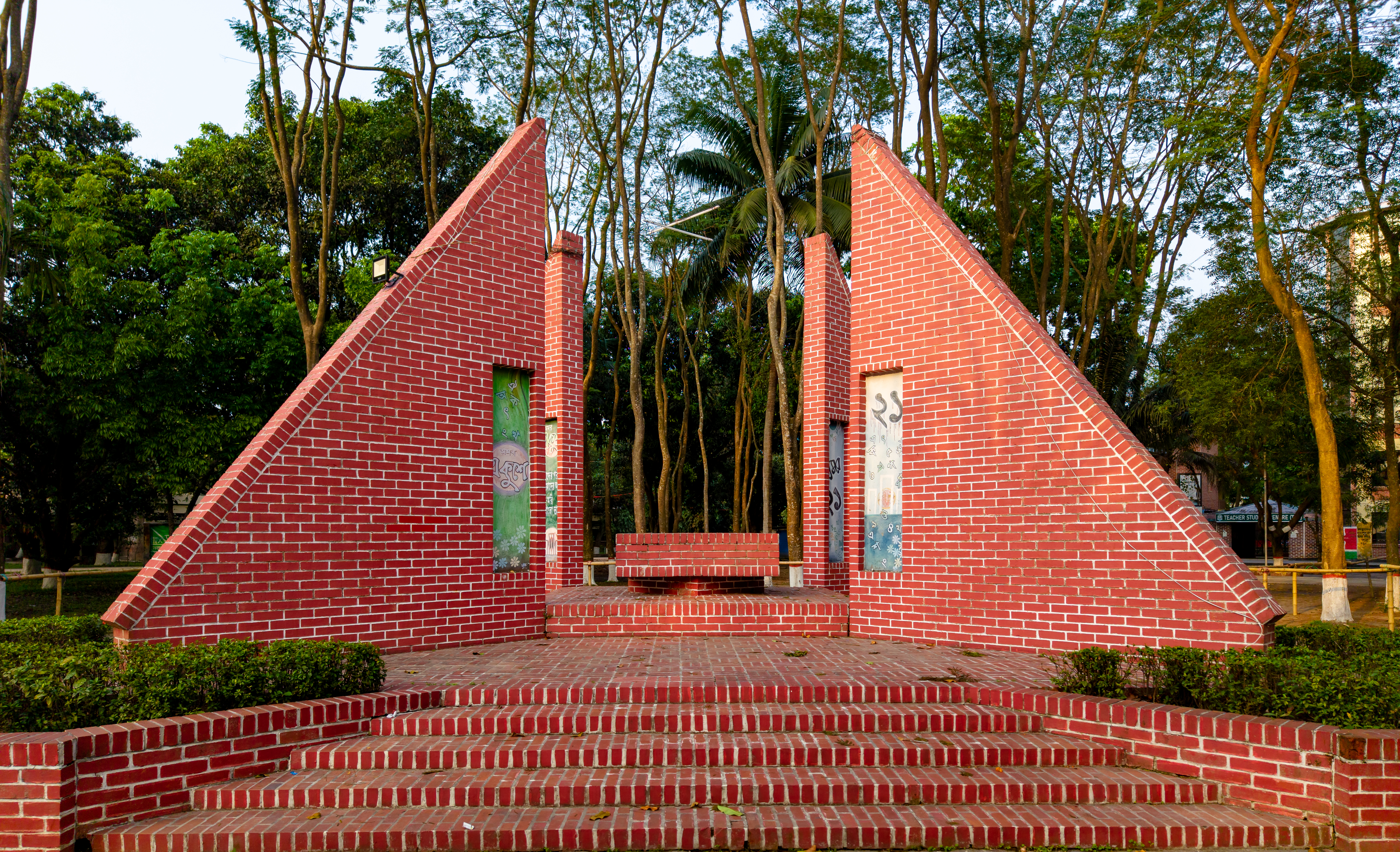
Saheed Minar at HSTU

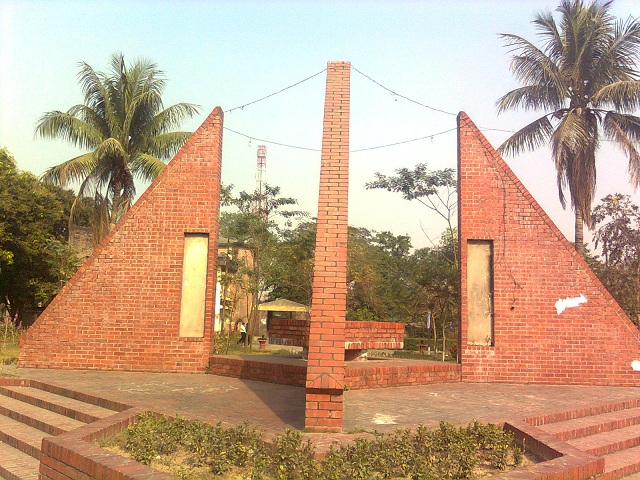
Saheed Minar at HSTU

== See also ==
- University of Dhaka
- Bangladesh University of Engineering and Technology
- Jahangirnagar University
- University of Chittagong
- Bangladesh University of Textiles (BUTEX)
- Islamic University, Bangladesh
- Islamic University of Technology (IUT)
- List of universities in Bangladesh
- List of Islamic educational institutions
- Military Institute of Science and Technology (MIST)
