= Uttara University =

University in Dhaka, Bangladesh

- উত্তরা বিশ্ববিদ্যালয়
- Motto: Excellence in Higher Education and Research
- Type: Private
- Established: 2003
- Parent institution: Dr. M. Azizur Rahman Trust (DAR Trust)
- Chancellor: President Mirza Fakhrul Islam Alamgir
- Vice-Chancellor: Eaysmin Ara Lekha
- Faculty: 423
- Students: 10,440
- Location: Holding 77, Beribadh Road, Turag, Uttara, Dhaka, 1230, Bangladesh; 23.88390°N 90.36132°E
- Campus: Turag, Uttara
- Website: uttara.ac.bd

University rankings

Regional – Overall
- QS Asia: 1401-1500 (2026)

Uttara University (Bengali: উত্তরা বিশ্ববিদ্যালয়, UU) is a private university established in 2003 by M. Azizur Rahman under the Private University Act 1992. The university operates its permanent campus in Uttara, Dhaka. More than forty undergraduate, graduate, and professional programs in the field of arts and social sciences, business, science and engineering, education, and physical education are offered by its five schools and fourteen departments. All academic programs are approved by the University Grants Commission (UGC) of Bangladesh and the Ministry of Education.

== History ==
Uttara University was founded in 2003 by M. Azizur Rahman. All academic programs offered by the university are approved by the University Grants Commission (UGC) and the Ministry of Education of Bangladesh. The university has since been included in several international university rankings (see Rankings and reputation).

Initially, the university’s campus was in Sector 6, Uttara. It relocated to its permanent campus in Uttara, on 2.40 acres of land, on 1 July 2023. In 2023, Eaysmin Ara Lekha was appointed vice-chancellor, succeeding the founding vice-chancellor.

== Campus facilities ==
Uttara University

Uttara University’s permanent campus is designed as a multi-building environment, with academic, administrative, and student facilities distributed over 260,081 square feet of built-up space, including a library and research laboratories.

The campus also includes a cafeteria for 450 people, common areas for recreational use, prayer facilities, common rooms, auditorium for 550-600 people, multipurpose hall, and sports zone of 2000 square feet.

== Organization and administration ==
The President of Bangladesh serves as Chancellor of the university, as is customary for universities in the country. Uttara University is governed by a Board of Trustees under the Uttara University Trust and its founding entity, the Dr. M. Azizur Rahman (DAR) Trust. The chief executive and academic officer is the Vice-Chancellor, supported by a Pro-Vice-Chancellor, Treasurer, Deans, and Heads of Departments.

Regular administration is distributed across offices covering academic governance, examinations, finance, student affairs, public relations, brand and communication, global engagement office, institutional ranking cell, mental health unit, IT, logistics, and legal compliance. The Medical & Emergency Center provides dedicated support to the student body. The university also has an Institutional Quality Assurance Cell.

== Schools and departments ==
Uttara University is organized into five schools and fourteen departments. Its admissions listings include undergraduate, graduate, and professional degree programs.

Schools, departments, and degree programs
School	Department	Degree programs
School of Arts and Social Science	Bangla	BA (Hons) in Bangla; MA in Bangla
School of Arts and Social Science	English	BA (Hons) in English; MA in English Literature; MA in English Language Teaching
School of Arts and Social Science	Islamic Studies	BA (Hons) in Islamic Studies; MA in Islamic Studies
School of Arts and Social Science	Law	LLB (Hons); LLM
School of Business Administration	Business Administration	BBA; MBA; Executive MBA
School of Civil, Environment and Industrial Engineering	Civil Engineering	BSc in Civil Engineering
School of Civil, Environment and Industrial Engineering	Fashion Design and Technology	BSc in Fashion Design and Technology; MBA in Apparel Merchandising and Fashion Management
School of Civil, Environment and Industrial Engineering	Textile Engineering	BSc in Textile Engineering
School of Education and Physical Education	Education	Bachelor of Education (BEd); Master of Education (MEd)
School of Education and Physical Education	Physical Education	Bachelor of Physical Education (BPEd); Master of Physical Education (MPEd)
School of Science and Engineering	Computer Science and Engineering	BSc in Computer Science and Engineering; MSc in Computer Science and Engineering
School of Science and Engineering	Electrical and Electronic Engineering	BSc in Electrical and Electronic Engineering
School of Science and Engineering	Mathematics	BSc (Hons) in Mathematics; MSc in Mathematics
School of Science and Engineering	Physics	MSc in Physics

Apart from offering undergraduate and graduate programs, Uttara University offers research opportunities on Fintech, Sustainable Nanoparticle Synthesis, Clean Energy, policy research, and continuing education (proposed).

== Research and publications ==
Uttara University reports active engagement in research and scholarly events through its departments and research centers. The university’s research page lists international conferences and academic events organized by different departments, including conferences on Nazrul in the twenty‑first century, business management, economics and social sciences, and Rabindra education philosophy, as well as participation in the International Congress of Bengal Studies.

In March 2026, EduRank's index attributed 791 academic publications and 6,770 citations to Uttara University and ranked it in 51 research topics. The university also hosts a yearly Research and Publication Award Ceremony where authors of indexed publications in SCOPUS, Web of Science and UU journals are rewarded with honorariums and acknowledgement. The ceremony is co-hosted by the Board of Trustees and the Centre for Research and Training at Uttara University.

== Rankings and reputation ==
EduRank’s 2026 overall ranking places Uttara University 58th in Bangladesh and 7,211th worldwide based on research performance, non-academic reputation, and alumni impact. In subject-specific categories, the university attains national positions including 44th in Bangladesh for business, with additional placements across finance and other subfields.

Other global and regional rankings include:

- QS Asia University Rankings 2026: Ranked 454th in Southern Asia and placed within the 1401–1500 band globally.
- WURI (World University Rankings for Innovation) 2025: Ranked 257th globally among the Top 400 innovative universities.
- UI GreenMetric World University Rankings 2025: Ranked 5th in Bangladesh and 1,314th globally.

== Student life ==
Uttara University supports a range of co‑curricular and extra‑curricular activities through student clubs, societies, and departmental forums. University materials emphasize opportunities in debate, cultural activities, sports, and discipline-specific clubs aligned with departments such as CSE, Business, English, and Law. Facilities like common rooms, indoor and outdoor sports spaces, and event venues on campus support student competitions and cultural events. All co-curricular activities are supervised by the Office of Student Affairs (OSA).

Student support services include academic advising, counseling, and career guidance provided through departmental offices and Centre for Career Development under the Office of External Affairs. The IT office facilitates digital platforms such as the “My UU” portal and LMS which allow students to access academic records, course registration, and notices online. Uttara University operates a free student shuttle service between its permanent campus and several locations in Dhaka. The university’s UU Bus app provides schedules and live route tracking.

=== Financial aid ===
Uttara University offers merit-based scholarships and need-based financial assistance. The Founder's Scholarship pays tuition for qualified undergraduate students with academic criteria for admission and continued eligibility. The University also has a discount on tuition for the children of freedom fighters.

== Convocations ==
Education Minister Nurul Islam Nahid addressing Uttara University's convocation on 30 October 2018

Uttara University has held nine convocations since its establishment. The university conferred degrees on more than 35,000 graduates. Its first convocation was held on 16 June 2009, and its ninth on 25 January 2025.

The eighth convocation was held on 3 October 2023.

== Notable people ==
=== Leadership ===
An Uttara University delegation led by Vice-Chancellor Eaysmin Ara Lekha meets President Mirza Fakhrul Islam Alamgir at Bangabhaban in 2026

- M. Azizur Rahman: Founder and former vice-chancellor of Uttara University.
- Eaysmin Ara Lekha: Vice-chancellor (from 2023); previously pro–vice-chancellor.

=== Notable alumni ===
- Khaled Bin Saifullah, an electrical and electronic engineering graduate of Uttara University, was a test engineer at Google as of August 2025.
- Nigar Sultana, captain of Bangladesh Women’s Cricket Team.
- Mak Yuree also known as Vajramunee was featured as one of the top five superhumans by a team of scientists from the Discovery Channel in 2013 in the strength category.
- Polas Chowdhury participated in the 19th FINA World Aquatics Championships held in Budapest, Hungary.
- Shirin Akter participated in the 2016 Summer Olympics in Rio de Janeiro as a female sprinter in the women's 100 metres.
- Mohammad Ashikuzzaman participated as an archer in the World Archery Championship in Berlin 2023.
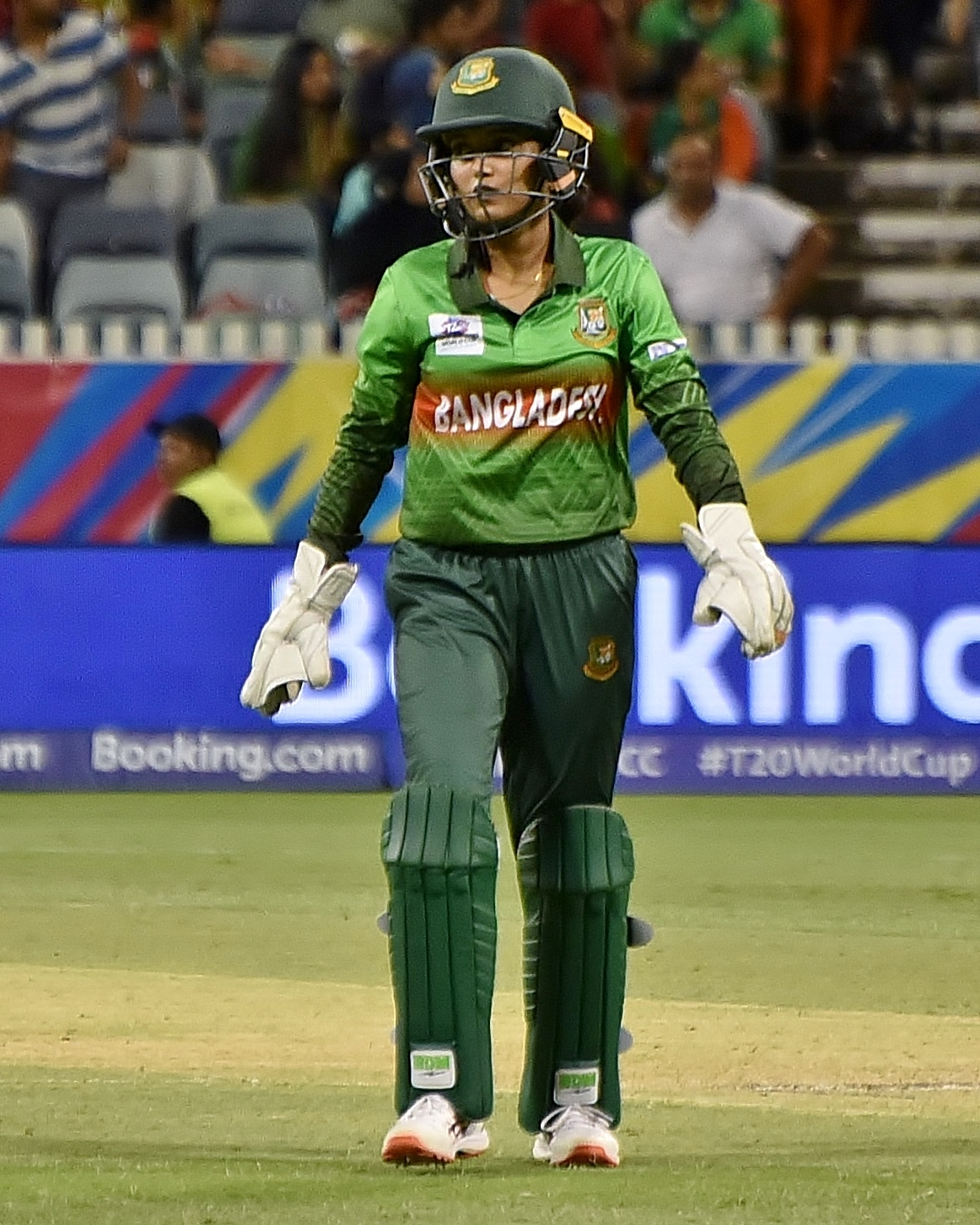
Nigar Sultana at the 2020 Women's T20 World Cup

Mak Yuree, martial artist

Bangladesh's 2016 relay bronze medalists, including Shirin Akter
