= Maksud Syundyukle =

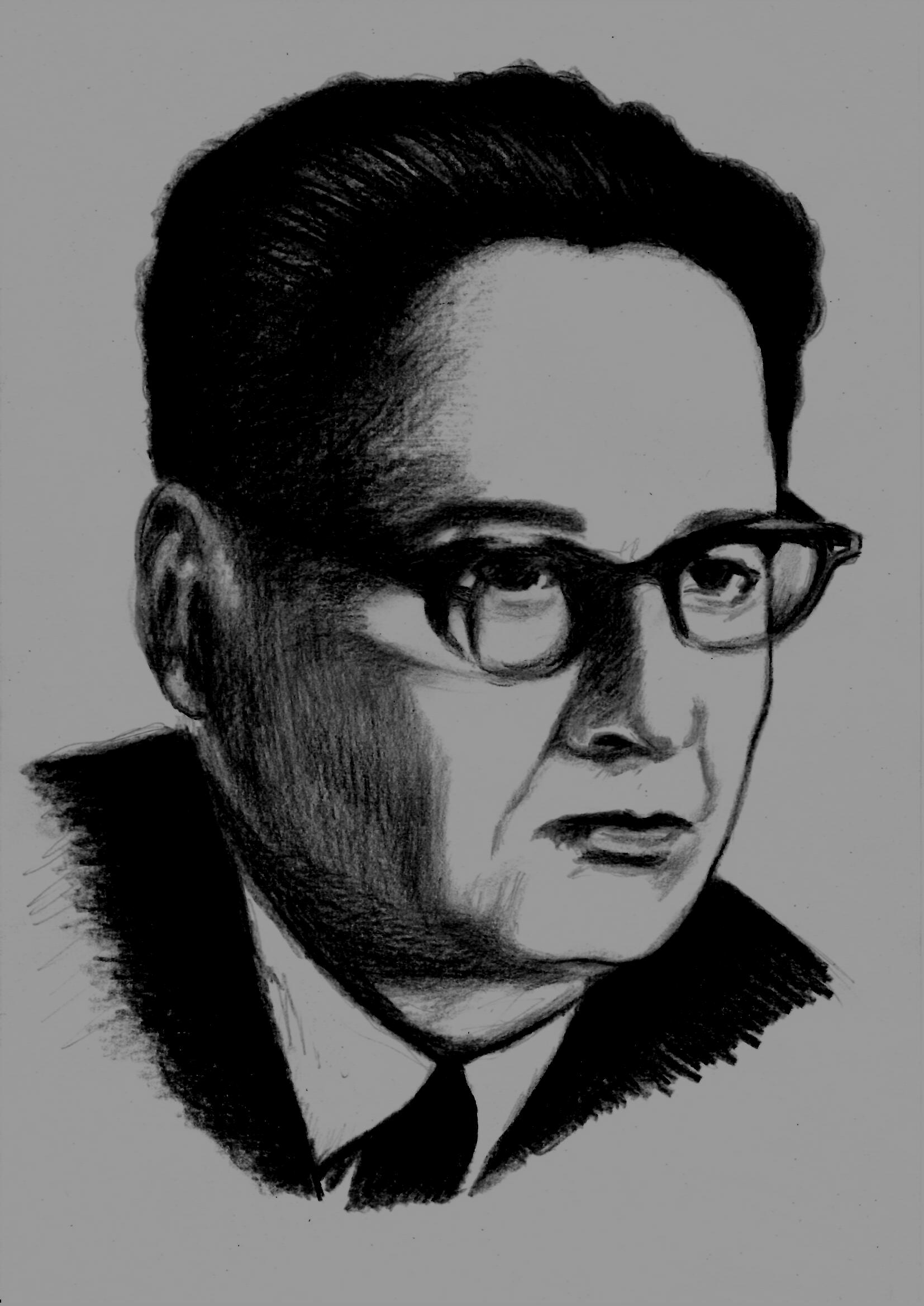
- Maksud Syundyukle
- Born: Maksudov Sadyk Mubinovich; 2 September 1904; Tetyushsky district of Kazan Governorate, village of Syundyukovo.
- Died: 23 October 1981 (aged 77); Ufa, Bashkortostan, Russia
- Citizenship: Russian Empire, USSR
- Occupations: poet, translator
- Spouse: Hanifa Chanysheva
- Children: Rustem, Nelya, Vil'
- Writing career
- Notable works: "Makar Mazay", "Ivan Yakutov"

Maksud Syundyukle (Tatar: Максуд Сөндекле, real name - Sadyk Mubinovich Maksudov Tatar: Садыйк Мөбин улы Максудов, September 2, 1904 – October 23, 1981) was a Tatar and Bashkir poet, translator. Member of the Writers' Union of the Bashkir ASSR. Honored Worker of Culture of the Bashkir ASSR.

== Biography ==
Maksud Syundyukle (Sadyk Mubinovich Maksudov) was born on September 2 (15), 1904 in the village of Syundyukovo (now Tetyushsky District, Tatarstan).

He received his primary education in the madrasah of his native village. In 1924, Sadyk Mubinovich went to the Donbas, where he began his working life as a laborer of the 1st mine of the “Artemugol(ru)” in the city of Artemovsk. In 1925-1927 he studied at the Soviet party school in Artemovsk, after graduation, worked for three years as a teacher at the Shcherbinovsky mine, eliminated illiteracy among workers of Tatar and Bashkir nationalities

Member of the CPSU since 1930. In 1931-1935 he worked as a literary employee in the Tatar newspaper “Пролетар” (“Proletarian”, Donetsk).

In 1935, at the invitation of the writer Daut Yultiy(ru), Maksud Syundyukle moved to Bashkortostan and since that time had been living in the city of Ufa. Here he worked as a journalist and literary employee of the Republican Radio Committee under the Council of People's Commissars of the Bashkir ASSR. Member of the Writers' Union of the Bashkir ASSR(ru) since 1937.

In 1941-43, Maksud Syundyukle served in the ranks of the Red Army, participated in the battles of the Great Patriotic War. After the war, he worked as a literary employee of the editorial team of the journal “Әдәби Башкортостан(ru)” and national newspapers.

In 1971, the name of the poet was entered in the Ufa city book of honor. In 1975, Maksud Syundyukle was awarded the title “Honored Worker of Culture of the Bashkir ASSR”.

He died on October 23, 1981, in Ufa. On the house on the Blucher Street 6/1, where he lived, a memorial plaque was installed. The poet’s grave is in the Muslim cemetery.

== Creative activity ==
M. Syundyukle's interest in literature aroused when he began attending a literary circle at the “Zaboy” (“Slaughtering”) magazine under the guidance of the famous writer Boris Gorbatov. Then in 1925, his first poems appeared, published by the newspaper “Этче” (“Worker”) and the magazine “Ять этче” (“Young Worker”), published in Tatar in Moscow

The first collections of poems by M. Syundyukle were “The Voice of Coal” (“Күмер тавышы”, 1930), “Mine is Breathing” (“Шахта сулый”, 1931), “Udarniks of Donbas” (“Донбасс ударниклары”, 1931), “Song of Donbas” (“Донбасс турында жыр”, 1932).

He wrote poems about the working class, labor exploits, about Salawat Yulayev, poems for children (“Beautiful Ural” (“Красив Урал”), etc.). One of his poems was dedicated to Alexey Stakhanov, whom he personally knew.

The poem “Makar Mazay(ru)” (Макар Мазай, 1951), which depicts the heroism of Soviet man during the years of World War II, became a significant stage in the poet’s work. This work became a noticeable phenomenon in Bashkir literature of that time and was highly appreciated by famous Soviet writers and critics during the Decade of Bashkir literature and art in Moscow(ru) in 1955. No less famous is the poem about the fate of the Ufa revolutionary Ivan Yakutov(ru) (1959).

Maksud Syundyukle is also known as a translator of the works of Alexander Pushkin, Mikhail Lermontov, Robert Burns, Mikhail Isakovsky and others, including the translation of the poems “Vasily Terkin” by Aleksandr Tvardovsky and "The Twelve" by Alexander Blok into the Bashkir language.

Maksud Syundyukle wrote his works in the Bashkir and Tatar languages, his poems were also published in Russian (translation by Nikolai Milovanov), Ukrainian (translation by Valentin Lagoda(uk)) and Kazakh. He is the author of 53 books that have been published in Ufa, Kazan, Moscow and Donetsk.

Composer Kamil Rakhimov(ru) wrote the songs “Summer Morning” (“Летнее утро”, 1946), “On the Bank of Dyoma” (“На берегу Дёмы”, 1952), “Cantata about Friendship” (“Кантата о дружбе”, 1957) to the words of Maksud Syundyukle.

== Family ==
All his life since 1932, Maksud Syundyukle lived in the marriage with Chanysheva Hanifa Shaimardanovna (1912-1985), whom he met around 1930, when she came from Bashkortostan to work in the Donbas. Children: daughter Nelya (Неля, 1937-2017, the wife of the literary critic Marat Mingazhetdinov (ru)), sons Rustem (Рустем, 1935-2017) and Vil' (Виль, 1939).

== Most famous works ==
=== In the Tatar language ===
- Сөндекле, Максуд (1930). Күмер тавышы: шигырьләр, хикәяләр [The Voice of Coal: poems, stories] (in Tatar). Мәскәү: СССР халыкларының үзәк нәшр.
- Сөндекле, Максуд (1931). Донбасс ударниклары: хикәя [Udarniks of Donbas: story] (in Tatar). Мәскәү: Центриздат.
- Сөндекле, Максуд (1931). Шахта сулый: шигырьләр, хикәяләр [Mine is Breathing: poems, stories] (in Tatar). Мәскәү: Центриздат.
- Сөндекле, Максуд (1932). Донбасс турында жыр: шигырьләр [Song of Donbas: poems] (in Tatar). Мәскәү: Центриздат.
- Сөндекле, Максуд (1938). Мәхәббәт: шигырьләр, поэмалар [Love: poems] (in Tatar). Казан: Татгосиздат.
- Сөндекле, Максуд (1941). Шигырьләр, поэмалар [Poems] (in Tatar). Казан: Татгосиздат.
- Сөндекле, Максуд (1948). Урал шигырьләре [Poems Of The Ural] (in Tatar). Казан: Татгосиздат.
- Сөндекле, Максуд (1955). Сайланма әсәрләр: шигырьләр, балладалар, поэмалар [Selected works: poems, ballads] (in Tatar). Казан: Таткнигоиздат.
- Сөндекле, Максуд (1960). Тормыш шатлыгы: шигырьләр [The joy of life: poems] (in Tatar). Казан: Татар. кит. нәшр.
- Сөндекле, Максуд (1977). Кемнең кулы матур: шигырьләр, поэмалар [Who has beautiful hands: poems] (in Tatar). Казан: Татар. кит. нәшр.

=== In Russian and Bashkir languages ===
- Сюндюкле, Максуд (1936). Песня о Стаханове. Поэма [Song about Stakhanov: the narrative poem] (in Bashkir). Уфа.
- Сюндюкле, Максуд (1952). Думы о Донбассе [Thoughts about Donbas] (in Russian). Translated by Милованов, Николай. Уфа: Башгосиздат.
- Сюндюкле, Максуд (1952). Слава труду: стихи и поэма "Макар Мазай" [Glory to Labor: poems and the narrative poem "Makar Mazay"] (in Russian). Translated by Милованов, Николай. Москва: Советский писатель.
- Сюндюкле, Максуд (1967). Иван Якутов. Поэма [Ivan Yakutov: the narrative poem] (in Russian). Translated by Милованов, Николай. Уфа: Башкирское книжное издательство.
- Сюндюкле, Максуд (1958). Хорошие люди: Стихи и поэмы [Good people: poems] (in Russian). Translated by Милованов, Николай. Москва: Советский писатель.
- Сөндөклө, Маҡсүд (1964). Һайланма әҫәрҙәр [Selected works] (in Bashkir). Өфө: Башҡ. кит. нәшр.
- Сюндюкле, Максуд (1972). Бессмертие (стихи и поэмы) [Immortality (poems)] (in Russian). Translated by Милованов, Николай. Уфа: Башк. кн. изд-во.
- Сөндөклө, Маҡсүд (1974). Беҙ ҡабыҙған уттар: шиғырҙар [We light the fire: poems] (in Bashkir). Өфө: Башҡ. кит. нәшр.
- Сөндөклө, Маҡсүд (1982). Поэмы о героях [Poems about heroes] (in Bashkir). Өфө: Башҡ. кит. нәшр.

=== In the Ukrainian language ===
- Сюндюкле, Максуд (1979). Макар Мазай. Поэма [Makar Mazay. Poem] (in Ukrainian). Translated by Лагода, Валентин. Донецьк: Донбас.

== Sources ==
- Татарский энциклопедический словарь [Tatar Encyclopedic Dictionary] (in Russian). Казань: Институт Татарской энциклопедии АН РТ. 1998.
- Елисеев, Е. (1952). "Переводчик или соавтор?" [Translator or co-author?]. Дружба народов (in Russian) (6).
- Гайнуллин, Г.; Хусаинов, М. (1969). Писатели Советской Башкирии. Биобиблиографический справочник [Writers of Soviet Bashkiria. Bibliographic directory] (in Russian). Уфа.
- Гиниятуллина, А. (1970). Писатели Советского Татарстана. Биобиблиографический справочник [Writers of Soviet Tatarstan. Bibliographic directory] (in Russian). Казань.
