= Nasim Akhtar (professor) =

Bangladeshi academic

Nasim Akhtar is the 1st vice chancellor of Chandpur Science and Technology University, previously worked as a professor in the Department of CSE and as the director of the Computer Center, Dhaka University of Engineering & Technology, Gazipur. Currently, he writes about Bangladesh's socioeconomic conditions and how it can be improved and how Bangladesh's education sector play a role in uplifting itself from a developing country to a developed one.

== Bibliography ==
- Bangladesh Open University Diploma in Computer Application (DCSA), 2nd semester "Operating Systems"
- Swapno O Safollyer Rosayon (স্বপ্ন ও সাফল্যের রসায়ন).

== See also ==
- Mohammed Akhtaruzzaman
- List of vice-chancellors of Bangladeshi universities
- Muhammed Zafar Iqbal
- Anisul Hoque
