= Mohammed Enamullah =

8th Vice-Chancellor

Hajee Mohammad Danesh Science and Technology University
- Incumbent
- Assumed office 23 October 2024
- Preceded by: M. Kamruzzaman

Personal details
- Born: Borhanuddin Upazila, Bhola District, Bangladesh
- Education: Jahangirnagar University; Technical University of Vienna, Austria
- Occupation: Professor, University Administrator

Mohammad Enamullla is a Bangladeshi chemist. He is a professor in the Department of Chemistry at Jahangirnagar University and the current Vice-Chancellor of Hajee Mohammad Danesh Science and Technology University (HSTU).

== Early life and education ==
Enamullla was born in Borhanuddin Upazila, Bhola District. He completed his bachelor's and master's degrees in chemistry from Jahangirnagar University. He obtained his PhD from the Technical University of Vienna, Austria. He also completed multiple postdoctoral research programs.

== Career ==
Mohammad Enamullla began his teaching career at Jahangirnagar University's Department of Chemistry in 1995 and was promoted to professor in 2003. He also served as the chair of the department. In addition, he worked as a visiting professor at several foreign universities. He has published over 80 research articles in national and international journals. On 21 October 2024, he was appointed Vice-Chancellor of Hajee Mohammad Danesh Science and Technology University in Dinajpur and officially took office on 23 October.
