= Teesta University =

Bangladeshi University

- তিস্তা ইউনিভার্সিটি
- Motto: Excellence in Education, Excellence in Life
- Type: Private
- Established: 11 April 2023
- Affiliation: University Grants Commission (UGC)
- Chancellor: President Mohammed Shahabuddin
- Vice-Chancellor: M. Abul Kashem
- Location: Modern More, R K Road, Rangpur 5404, Bangladesh; 25.711314°N 89.256266°E
- Campus: Urban
- Website: teestauniversity.ac.bd

Teesta University, Rangpur is a private university located in Rangpur, Bangladesh. In 2023, it became the first private university established in Rangpur Division.

== History ==
The university was established on 11 April 2023 under the control of the Teesta University Trust and sanctioned by the Ministry of Education in accordance with the Private University Act of 2010.

== Schools and departments ==
The university has five faculties.

- Faculty of Agriculture and Veterinary
- Faculty of Arts
- Faculty of Biological Science
- Faculty of Business Administration
- Faculty of Science and Engineering

== Administration ==
- Vice-chancellor: Muhammad Abul Kashem (since 24 November 2023)
- Treasurer: Shazib Chowdhury
- Registrar: Md. Ataur Rahman
