= Atish Dipankar University of Science and Technology =

Private university in Dhaka, Bangladesh

Atish Dipankar University of Science & Technology
- অতীশ দীপঙ্কর বিজ্ঞান ও প্রযুক্তি বিশ্ববিদ্যালয়
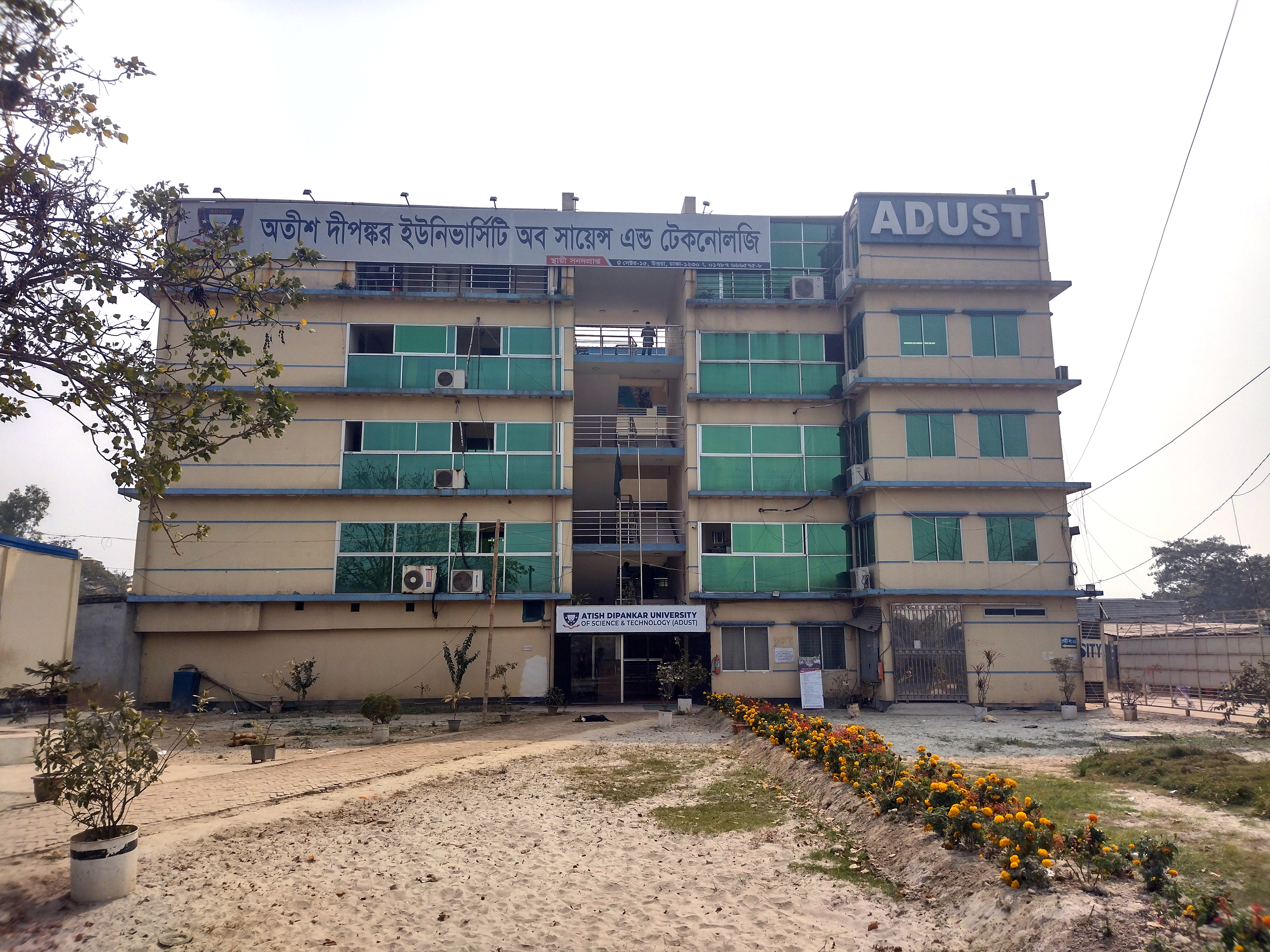
- ADUST building, 2024
- Motto: "Centre of Excellence"
- Type: Private
- Established: 18 August 2004; 22 years ago
- Academic affiliations: UGC
- Chancellor: President Mirza Fakhrul Islam Alamgir
- Vice-Chancellor: Md Zahangir Alam
- Academic staff: 243
- Location: Plot - 209, Khantek, Sector - 15, Uttara, Dhaka, 1230, Bangladesh; 23.867019°N 90.377283°E
- Campus: Urban, 1 acre (0.40 ha)
- Language: English
- Colors: Dark blue
- Website: adust.edu.bd

Atish Dipankar University of Science & Technology (Bengali: অতীশ দীপঙ্কর বিজ্ঞান ও প্রযুক্তি বিশ্ববিদ্যালয়), abbreviated as ADUST, is a private university in Uttara, Dhaka, Bangladesh. The university was named after Atish Dipankara Srijnana, the ancient Buddhist scholar.

== History ==
Authorized by Private University Act 1992, the university was established on 18 August 2004, after getting approval from the University Grants Commission Bangladesh. Anwara Begum, first women vice-chancellor in Bangladesh, was founding vice-chancellor of the university.

It had temporary campus in Uttara, Panthapath, Mirpur, Paltan and Banani. In 2017, they moved to their new permanent campus.

On 11 September 2021, Atish Dipankar University of Science and Technology received a certificate for establishing their permanent campus from the Ministry of Education as the fifth university.

== Administration ==
=== Vice-Chancellors ===
Here is the list of Vice-Chancellors of Atish Dipankar University of Science and Technology:

- Anwara Begum (2004 – 2011)
- Abul Hossain Sikder (2011 – 2015)
- Dilip Kumar Nath (2015 – 2016)
- Nazrul Islam Khan (2016 – 2017)
- Sekul Islam (1 August 2017 – 21 July 2021)
- Rafique Uddin Ahmed (22 July 2021 – 20 January 2022)
- Md Zahangir Alam (20 January 2022 – present)

=== Board of trustees ===
The members of the Board of Trustees are as follows:

- Mohammed Shamsul Alam Liton
- Md. Mobarak Hossain
- Amin Ahmed
- Ariful Bari Mojumder
- Mohammod Sirajul Huq Chowdhury
- Imtiaz Ahmed
- Md. Quamruzzaman Litu
- Mst. Kamrun Nehar
- Tanvir Islam Patwary
- Selina Begum
- Md. Jonayet Ahmed
- Sultana Parvin

== Faculties ==
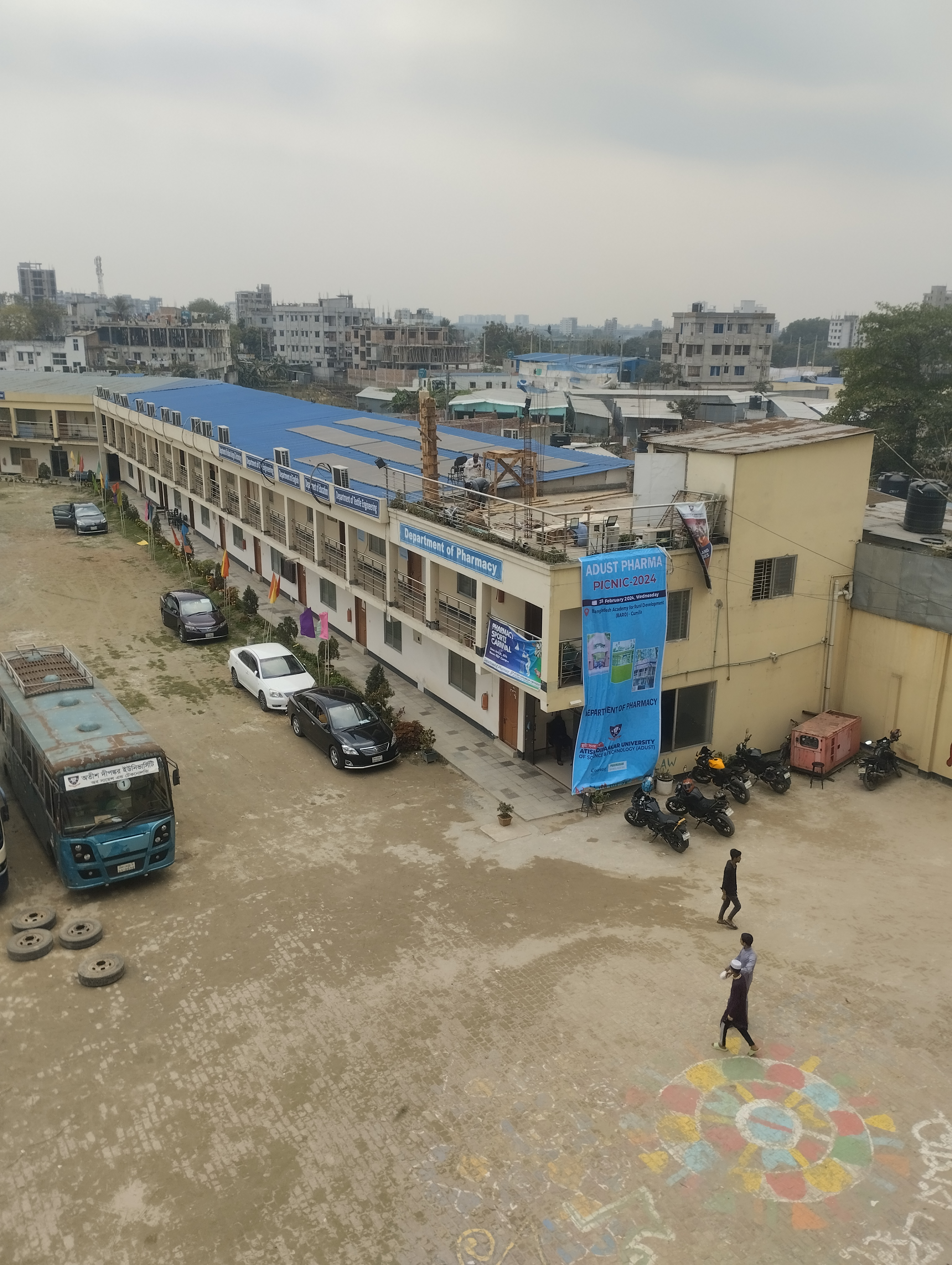
Second building of the campus

The academic programs are related to the Faculty of Arts and Social Science, Faculty of Law, Faculty of Business and Economics, and Faculty of Science and Technology.

=== Faculty of Arts and Social Science ===
1. Department of English language
2. Department of Law

=== Faculty of Business Administration ===
1. Department of Business Administration
2. Department of Agribusiness

=== Faculty of Science and Technology ===
1. Department of Civil Engineering
2. Department of Computer Science
3. Department of Computer Engineering
4. Department of Electronic and Telecommunication Engineering (ETE)
5. Department of Electrical and Electronic Engineering (EEE)
6. Department of Textile Engineering
7. Department of Pharmacy

=== Laboratories of Department of Textile Engineering ===
1. Yarn Manufacturing Lab
2. Textile Testing and Quality Control Lab
3. Computer Lab
4. Fabric Manufacturing Lab-1 (Weaving)
5. Fabric Manufacturing Lab-2 (Knitting)
6. Garments Lab

Some of the practical classes are held at other private textile mills, factories and commercial laboratories.

=== School of Public Health ===
1. Master of Public Health (MPH)

== Programs ==
=== Undergraduate programs ===
- Bachelor of Science in Pharmacy
- Bachelor of Science in Civil Engineering (BSCE)
- Bachelor of Science in Arts in English
- Bachelor of Science in (Regular)
- Bachelor of Science in Electrical and Electronic Engineering
- Bachelor of Science in Textile Engineering
- Bachelor of Science in Administration

=== Graduate programs ===
- Master of Business Administration (MBA & EMBA)
- Master of Business Administration in Agribusiness
- Master of Public Health (MPH)
- Master of Arts in English
- LL. M (Regular)

== Achievement ==
The university's team were the second runner-up at the Robo-Carnival 2016. Later, at Robo-Carnival 2019, they were the first runner-up and got an award under the project show category. At Bangladesh ICT Expo 2018, the university ranked sixth position out of ten. Students from the university were also nominated as Microsoft Campus Ambassadors.

== Number of graduates ==
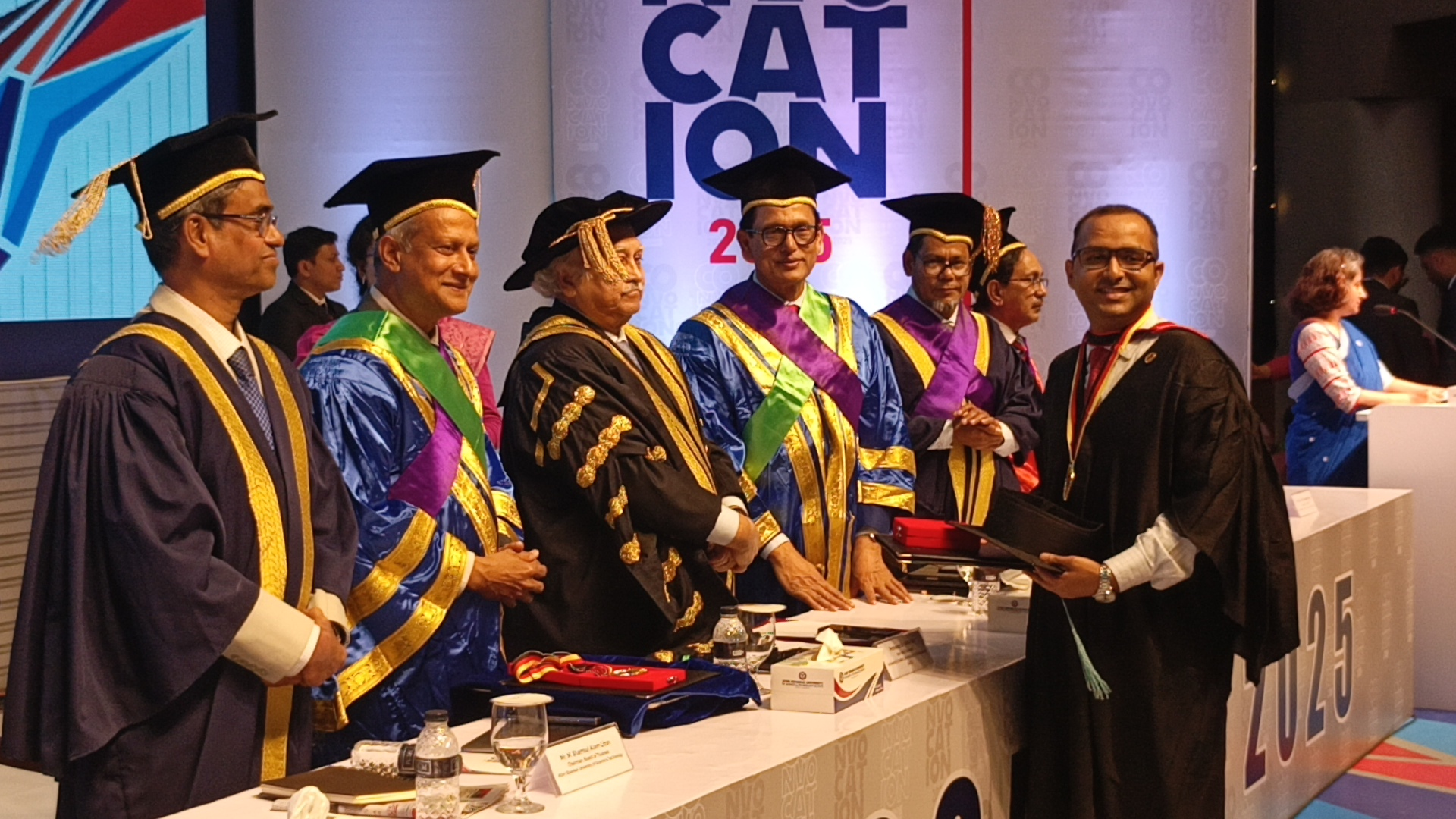
Convocation of ADUST, 2025

The first convocation of 22 December 2008 had 161 students. As of Second convocation on 15 May 2017, around 11,000 have graduated.

== Donation ==
Dutch-Bangla Bank Limited (DBBL) donated Tk 10 lakh to ADUST. The purpose of the donation was to establish a modern pharmacy lab.

== Partnership ==
On 14 May 2019, the university authority signed an agreement with Narail Express Foundation, which will allow at least twenty students every year to study for 100% free scholarships at the university for the students of Narail for more than next ten years.
