= Md. Maksud Helali =

Bangladeshi academic and researcher

- Occupations: Academic, mechanical engineer, administrator
- Title: Vice-Chancellor of Khulna University of Engineering & Technology
- Term: 2025–2026

Academic background
- Education: PhD (Dublin, Ireland); MSc Engg, BSc Engg (BUET)

Academic work
- Discipline: Materials, fracture mechanics
- Institutions: Bangladesh University of Engineering & Technology; Khulna University of Engineering & Technology

Md. Maksud Helali is a Bangladeshi mechanical engineer, academic, and university administrator. He served as the vice-chancellor of Khulna University of Engineering & Technology (KUET). He is the former professor at the Bangladesh University of Engineering and Technology (BUET).

== Early life ==
Helali completed his BSc and MSc degrees in mechanical engineering from the Bangladesh University of Engineering and Technology (BUET). He later obtained his PhD from a university in Dublin, Ireland.

== Career ==
Helali joined the Department of Mechanical Engineering at BUET, where he served as a professor. Over the years, he taught courses such as mechanics of machinery, bio-engineering, and surface engineering.

In February 2008, Helali was elected a member of the executive committee of the Bangladesh University of Engineering and Technology Teachers' Association.

In July 2025, Helali was appointed vice-chancellor of Khulna University of Engineering & Technology (KUET) by the President of Bangladesh, in accordance with Section 10(1) of the KUET Act, 2003. He assumed office on July 25, 2025, during a transitional period for the university, following administrative challenges and student unrest.

== Publications ==
- Building and Fire Safety Assessments.
- Investigation of an Optimum Method of Bio degradation Process for Jute Polymer Composites.
