= M. Azizur Rahman (academic) =

Academic personality

M. Azizur Rahman is a Bangladeshi academic and former Vice-Chancellor of Uttara University. He is a former economic advisor of United States Agency for International Development at the Embassy of the United States, Dhaka.

== Early life ==
Azizur Rahman did his undergraduate and master's in agricultural economics from Bangladesh Agricultural University. He did his PhD in economics at Vanderbilt University in 1988.

== Career ==
Azizur Rahman fought in the Bangladesh Liberation War in 1971.

From 1989 to 1997, Azizur Rahman was the economic advisor of United States Agency for International Development at the Embassy of the United States, Dhaka. He is a member of Asiatic Society of Bangladesh and the Bangladesh Economic Association.

In 2003, Azizur Rahman founded Uttara University and was appointed its first vice-chancellor.

== Personal life ==
Azizur Rahman is married to Eaysmin Ara Lekha, Vice-Chancellor of Uttara University.
