= Mohammad Abdur Rashid (academic) =

Bangladeshi vice chancellor

Mohammad Abdur Rashid is a Bangladeshi academic and vice-chancellor of the Islamic Arabic University. He is a member of the Sharia advisory board of the Bangladesh Securities and Exchange Commission.

Rashid is a professor of the Department of Islamic studies at the University of Dhaka.

== Early life ==
Rashid did his bachelor's degree and masters in Islamic Studies at the University of Dhaka in 1988 and 1989 respectively. He completed his PhD at the University of Dhaka in 2002.

== Career ==
Rashid joined Abudharr Ghifari College as a lecturer on 6 November 1995. He joined the University of Dhaka as a lecturer on 1 October 1997. He was promoted to assistant professor on 7 November 2000. He was promoted to associate professor on 21 May 2003.

Rashid was promoted to professor on 5 September 2006.

From 18 February 2014 to 17 February 2017, Rashid was the head of the Department of Islamic Studies at the University of Dhaka. He was a member of the Bangladesh Madrasah Education Board. On 31 December 2019, he was appointed the chairman of the Governing Committee of Nilkhet High School. He is a member of the Shariah Supervisory Committee of the United Commercial Bank PLC.

Rashid was appointed to the Sharia advisory board of the Bangladesh Securities and Exchange Commission. On 1 June 2020, Rashid was appointed provost of Kabi Jashim Uddin Hall of the University of Dhaka. In April 2023, he was appointed the vice-chancellor of the Islamic Arabic University. He replaced Mohammad Ahsan Ullah, whose term was investigated by the Ministry of Education and the University Grants Commission over irregularities in recruitment. In July, he was appointed director of Dr. Serajul Haque Centre for Islamic Research. In November 2023, he was re-elected president of the Department of Islamic Studies Alumni Association.

On 24 January 2024, Rashid was appointed convenor of a committee to investigate a story about a transgender woman in a high school textbook of the national curriculum.
