= Exim Bank Agricultural University Bangladesh =

Private agricultural university in Chapainawabganj, Bangladesh

Coordinates: 24.5969°N 88.2702°E

EXIM Bank Agricultural University Bangladesh
- এক্সিম ব্যাংক কৃষি বিশ্ববিদ্যালয় বাংলাদেশ
- Type: Private agricultural university
- Established: 2013
- Founder: EXIM Bank Agricultural University Bangladesh Trust
- Parent institution: Exim Bank (Bangladesh)
- Affiliations: University Grants Commission of Bangladesh
- Chancellor: President Mohammed Shahabuddin
- Location: Chapainawabganj, Rajshahi, Bangladesh
- Colors
- Website: ebaub.ac.bd

EXIM Bank Agricultural University Bangladesh (Bengali: এক্সিম ব্যাংক কৃষি বিশ্ববিদ্যালয় বাংলাদেশ) is the first private agricultural university in Bangladesh.

== History ==
Prime Minister Sheikh Hasina inaugurated the university through a function at her official residence Ganobhaban on 9 October 2013. Until 2013, there was no existence of private agricultural university in Bangladesh.

== Academics ==
EBAUB uses English as its medium of instruction and implements Term based Course Credit System, where the student can understand going through the following points thoroughly:

1. The Course Credit System: The course credit system involves course work with regular classes, assignments, unannounced quizzes, and pre-scheduled 2 midterms and final examinations. In this system, subject matter is taught in modules (courses) of reasonably homogenous subject matter, The students will receive "Grades" for each of the courses taken to indicate the extent of his/her mastery of the subject matter taught in each respective course.
2. Term: An academic year is divided into three terms – Summer, Autumn and Winter. Each term consists of 12 (twelve) effective weeks.
3. Credit: One class hour in a week during a term shall be considered as one credit. For laboratory classes, two class hours shall be considered as one credit.
4. Course: A course is a set of topics delivered to the students by lectures, contact hours and practical exercises on a specific subject incorporated in the approved curricular layout and developed by faculty members.

== Faculties and departments ==
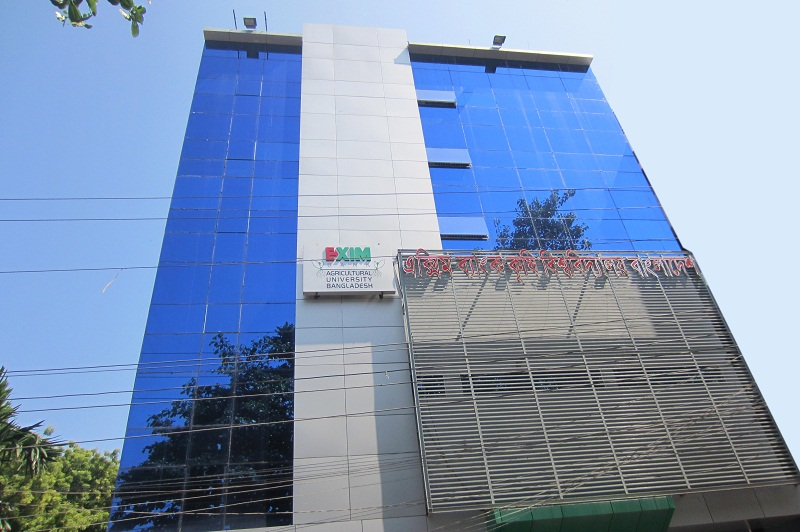
এক্সিম ব্যাংক কৃষি বিশ্ববিদ্যালয়

=== Faculty of Agriculture ===
- Agricultural Extension and Rural Development
- Agroforestry and Environment
- Agronomy
- Agricultural Engineering
- Agro-processing
- Biochemistry and Molecular Biology
- Environmental Science
- Biotechnology
- Computer Science and Information Technology( CSIT )
- Crop Botany
- Entomology
- Genetics and Plant Breeding
- Horticulture
- Plant Pathology
- Soil Science
- Seed Science and Technology Unit

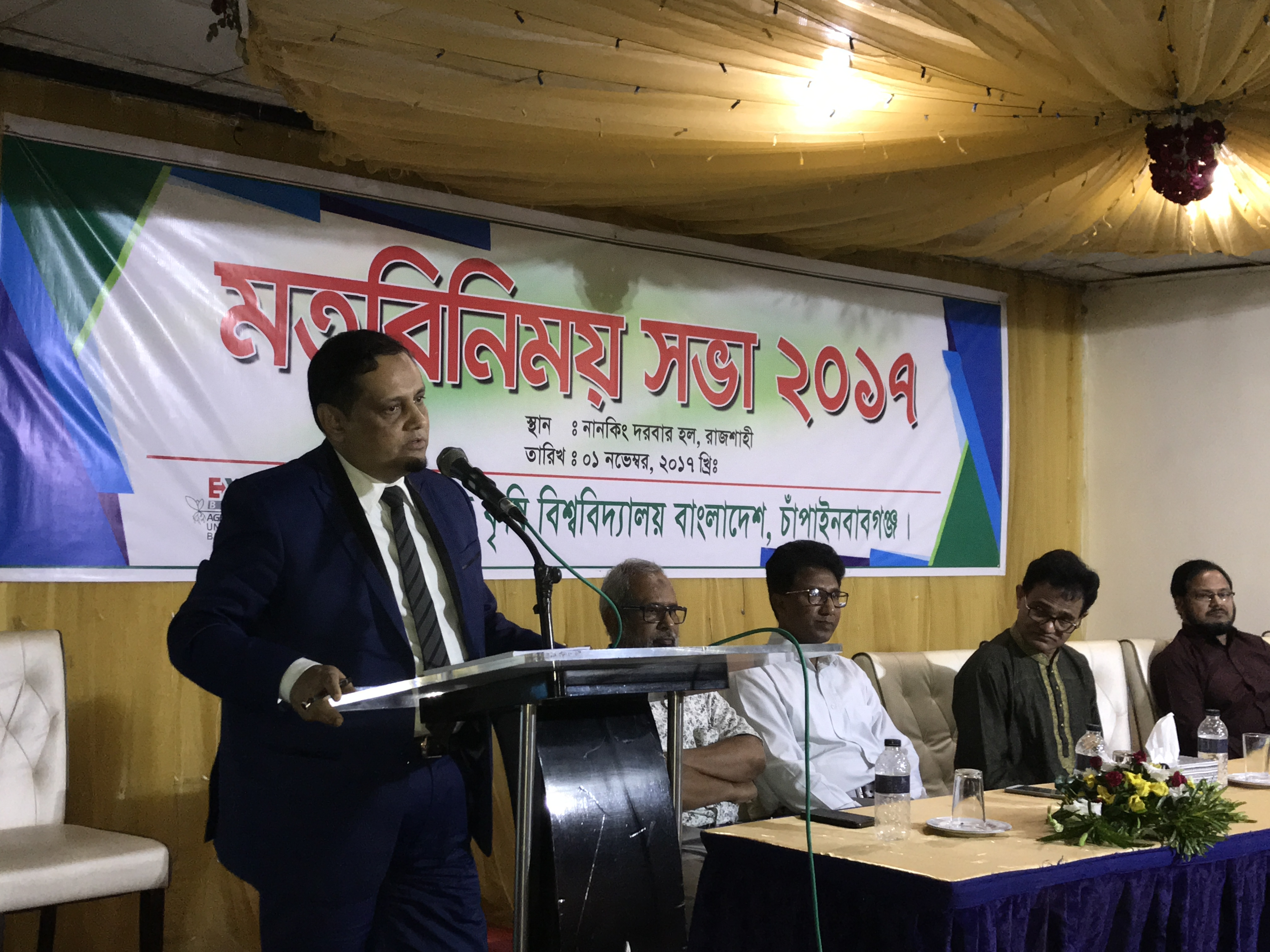
EBAUB Vice Chancellor ABM Rashedul Hasan delivering a Speech among College Teachers.

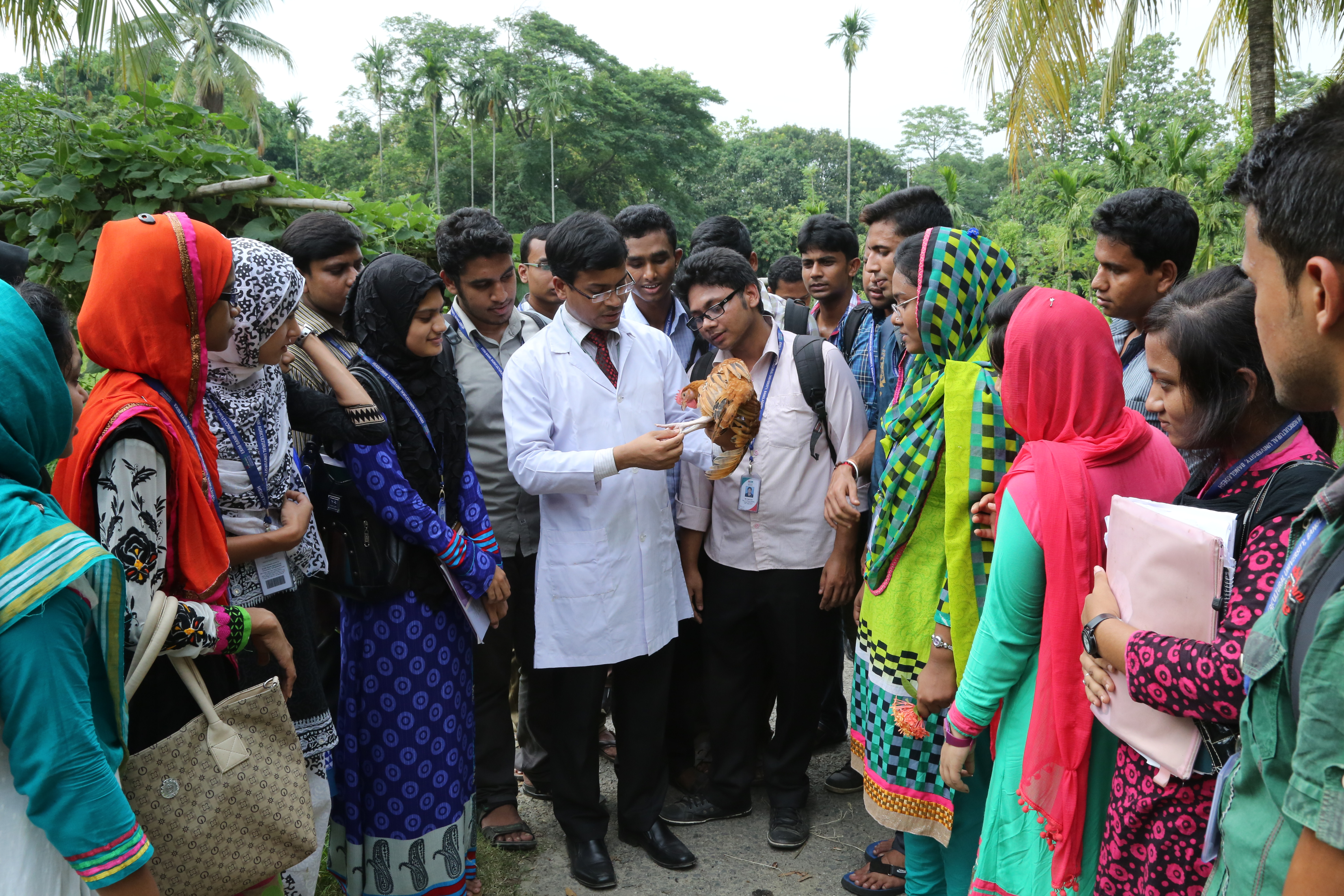
Students participating in the DVM class at EXIM Bank Agricultural University.

=== Faculty of Agricultural Economics and Rural Development ===
- Department of Agricultural Economics
- Department of Agribusiness
- Department of Agricultural Finance & Cooperatives
- Department of Rural Development
- Department of Statistics

=== Faculty of Business Administration ===
- Department of Accounting
- Department of Finance
- Department of Marketing
- Department of Management

=== Faculty of LAW ===
- Department of LAW and Justice

== Permanent campus ==
EXIM Bank Agricultural University Bangladesh, Has started procuring land for its permanent campus. In an area near Amnura the university has already purchased land for its initial phase and aims to procure 1200 Bigha (480.628272 Acres) very soon.

== Memoranda of understanding with other universities ==
EXIM Bank Agricultural University has Signed MOU with the following Academic Institutions

- Charles Sturt University, Queensland, Australia
- Sabaragamuwa University of Sri Lanka
- Universiti Teknologi MARA, Malaysia
- University of Kuala Lumpur, Malaysia
- Begum Rokeya University, Rangpur, Bangladesh

== Available programs ==
=== Undergraduate ===
- BS. Agriculture
- BS. Agricultural Economics
- B.B.A
- L.L.B

=== Postgraduate ===
- EMBA (Executive Master in Business Administration)
- MBA (Master in Business Administration)
- MBM (Master in Bank Management)

== See also ==
- University of Rajshahi (RU)
- Rajshahi University of Engineering & Technology (RUET)
- University of Dhaka (DU)
- List of universities in Bangladesh
