= Stamford University Bangladesh =

Private university in Dhaka, Bangladesh

- স্টামফোর্ড ইউনিভার্সিটি বাংলাদেশ
- Crest of Stamford University Bangladesh
- Motto: Education for tomorrow's world a greener world
- Type: Private
- Established: 2002
- Chancellor: President of Bangladesh
- Vice-Chancellor: Sharif Nafe As-Saber
- Academic staff: 350 (full-time faculty)
- Students: 12,000+
- Location: 51 Siddeswari Road (Ramna), Dhaka, Bangladesh; 23.7450°N 90.4083°E
- Campus: Urban
- Website: stamforduniversity.edu.bd

University rankings

Global – Overall
- QS World: 1401+ (2026)

Regional – Overall
- QS Asia: 781-790 (2026)

Stamford University Bangladesh (Bengali: স্টামফোর্ড ইউনিভার্সিটি বাংলাদেশ) is a private university in Dhaka, Bangladesh. It was established in 2002 under the Private University Act. Before starting as a university, its predecessor institution was known as a Stamford College Group established in 1994, later it was upgraded to a university in 2002 and appeared as Stamford University Bangladesh. Stamford University is the first ISO certified university in Bangladesh. Stamford University Bangladesh is fully approved by University Grants Commission. The university was recently asked by the commission along with 3 other private universities to stop enrolling new students for failing to fulfill UGC's condition to shift to a permanent campus.

== Campus ==
Stamford University Bangladesh has only one campus in Siddeshwari (Bailey Road) area of Dhaka city. The campus comprises all of the departments and offices.

The campus is one of the largest among private universities in Bangladesh with outdoor basketball ground, a swimming pool, café, and in-campus shop facilities.

A permanent campus is about to be constructed at Green Model Town, a privately planned area of Dhaka close to Motijheel.

== Departments ==
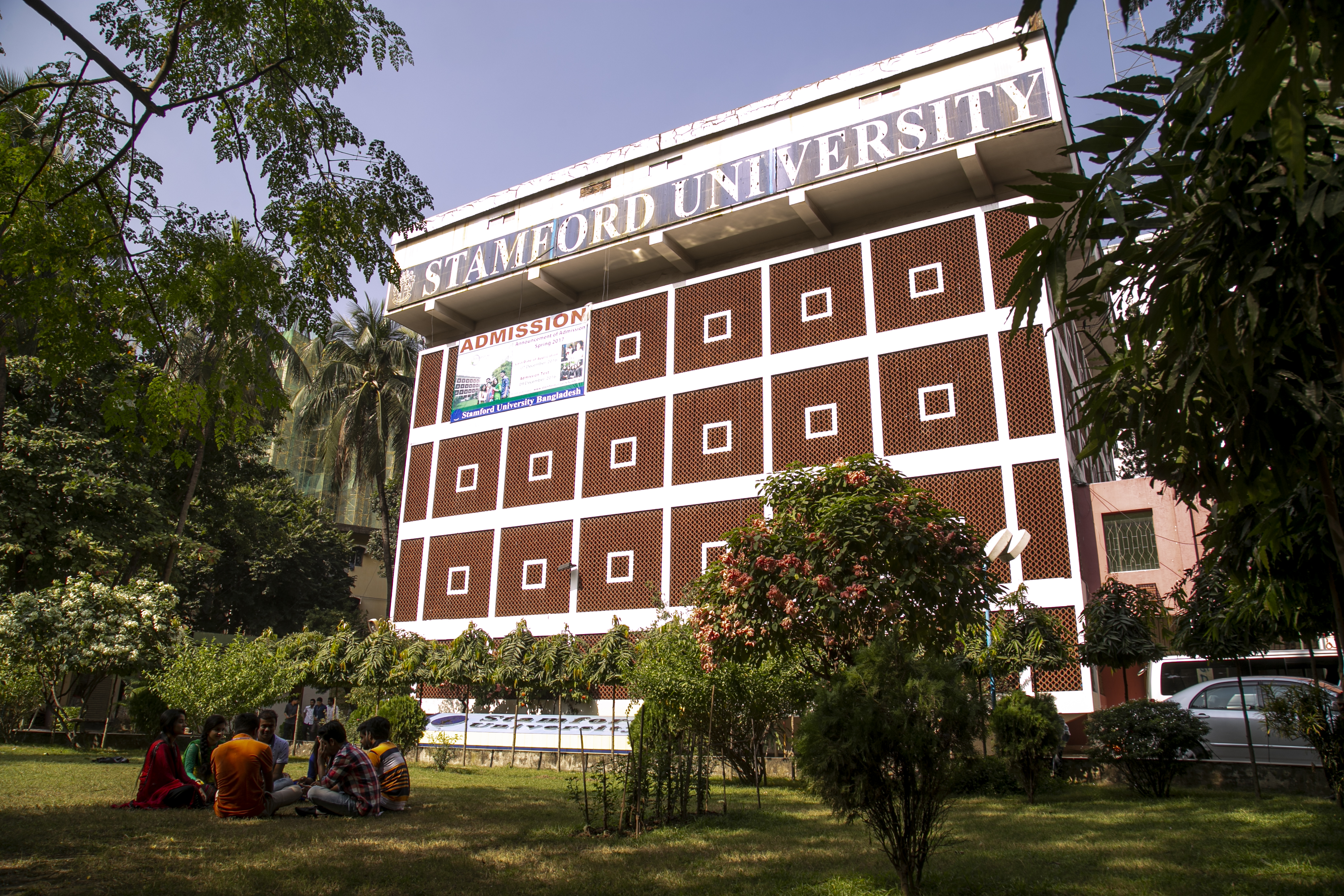
Stamford University Campus image 2017

- Department of Architecture
- Department of Business Administration
- Department of Civil Engineering
- Department of Computer Science
- Department of Economics
- Department of Electrical and Electronic Engineering
- Department of English
- Department of Environmental Science
- Department of Film and Media
- Department of Journalism Media Studies
- Department of Law
- Department of Microbiology
- Department of Pharmacy
- Department of Public Administration

== Subjects and Courses ==
=== Undergraduate programs ===
- Bachelor of Science in Microbiology
- Bachelor of Pharmacy
- Bachelor of Laws (LL.B)
- Bachelor of Arts in Film & Media
- Bachelor of Public Administration
- Bachelor of Architecture
- Bachelor of Business Administration
- Bachelor of Science in Civil Engineering
- Bachelor of Arts with Honors in English
- Bachelor of Social Science in Economics
- Bachelor of Science in Environmental Science
- Bachelor of Science in Computer Science & Engineering
- Bachelor of Science in Electrical & Electronic Engineering
- Bachelor of Social Science in Journalism for Electronic & Print Media

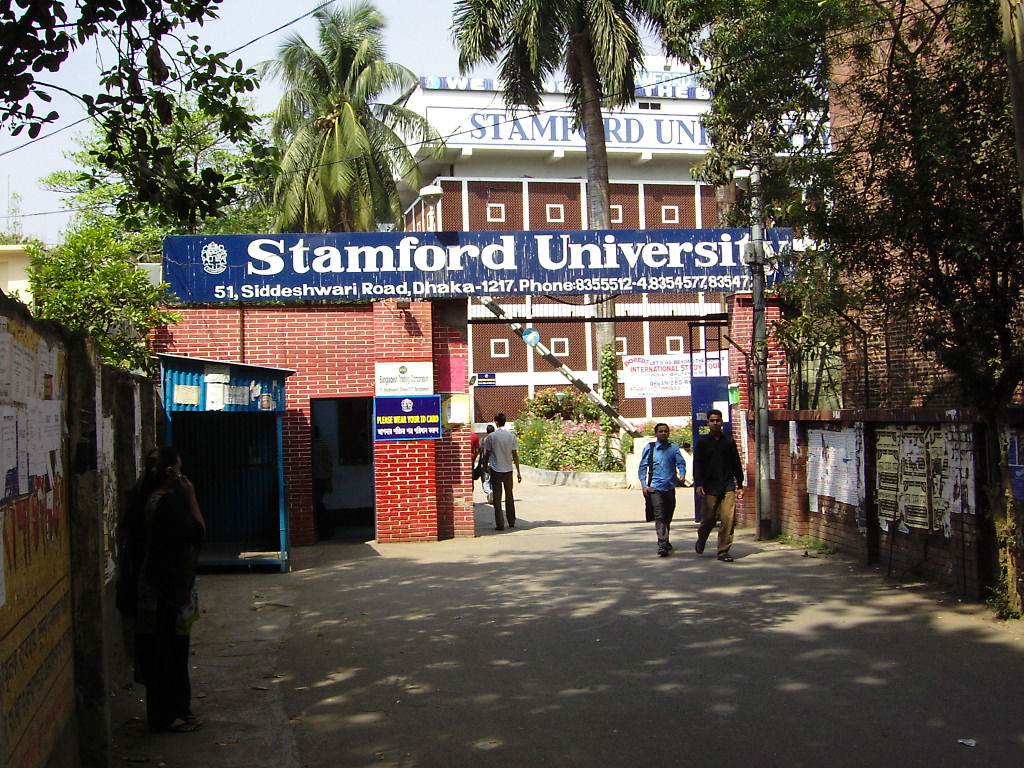
Entrance to Stamford University (Siddeshwari campus)

=== Graduate programs ===
- Master of Social Science in Journalism & Media Studies
- Master of Science in Computer Science & Engineering
- Master of Arts in Film & Media (Preliminary & Final)
- Master of Science in Environmental Science
- Master of Social Science in Economics
- Master of Arts in Film & Media (Final)
- Master of Science in Microbiology
- Master of Business Administration
- Master In Computer Application
- Master of Arts in English (Final)
- Master of Public Administration
- Master of Laws (LL.M)
- Master of Pharmacy

=== Short course ===
- Japanese Language Course

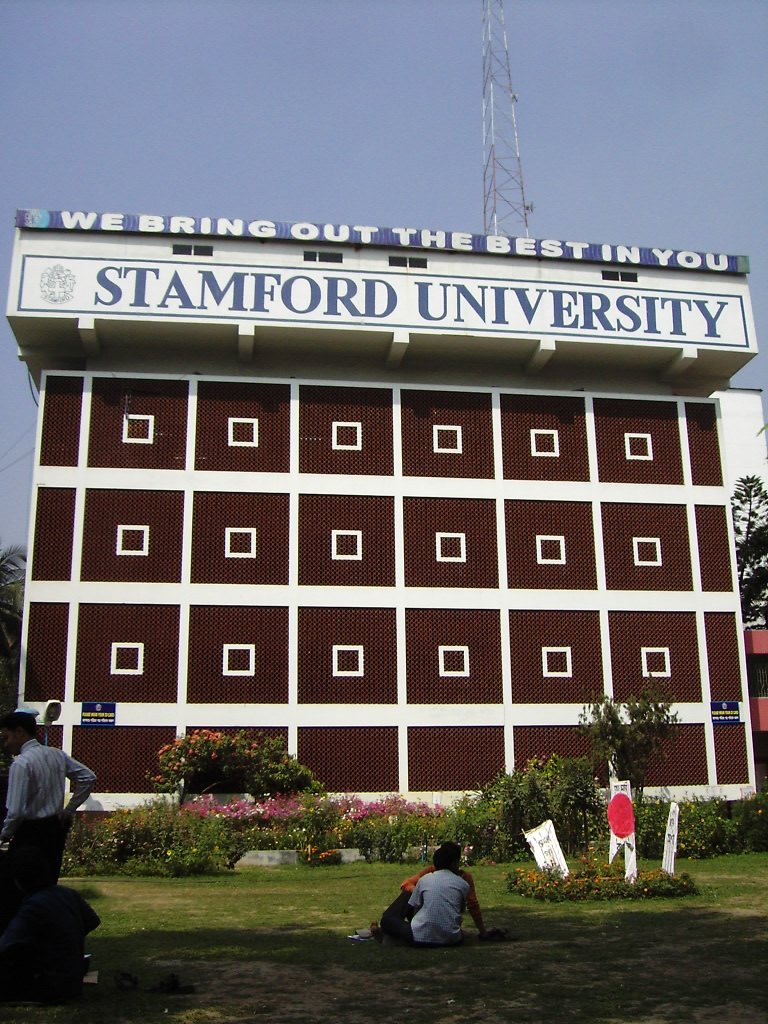
Siddeshwari campus

== Centers ==
- Career Counseling and Placement Centre (CCPC).
- Stamford Institute on Addiction and Rehabilitation (SIAR).
- Centre for Professional Development in Business (CPDB).
- Stamford University Research Centre (SURC).
- Japanese Language Centre (JLC).
- International Centre for Development and Research (ICDR).
- Centre for South Asian Policy Research (CSAPR).
- Centre for Continuing Education, Consulting, and Research (CCR).

== Credit transfer ==
The university provides credit transfer facility for its students to foreign universities. The university has transferred more than 100 students of BBA, MBA, CSE, and CSI programs to different universities of the US, the UK, Canada, and Australia. It has arranged joint degree programs and credit transfer programs with Claflin University, State University of New York, and Monash University, Australia.

== See also ==
- Stamford International University (Thailand)
