= Jahangir Alam Khan =

Bangladeshi agricultural economist

- জাহাঙ্গীর আলম খান

Vice-Chancellor of the University of Global Village
- Incumbent
- Assumed office 14 November 2017

Director General of BLRI
- In office 16 May 2006 – 7 December 2009

Personal details
- Born: 31 December 1952 (age 73) Brahmanbaria, East Bengal
- Education: Bangladesh Agricultural University
- Awards: Ekushey Padak (2020)

Jahangir Alam Khan (born 31 December 1952) is a Bangladeshi agricultural economist and researcher. He is the incumbent Vice Chancellor of the University of Global Village (UGV). Prior to his appointment in the university, he was the director general of Bangladesh Livestock Research Institute (BLRI). He also served as a director of Bangladesh Agricultural Research Council. In recognition of his contribution in research, the government of Bangladesh awarded him the country's second highest civilian award Ekushey Padak in 2020.

== Early life ==
Khan was born on 31 December 1952 in the Ghatiara village of Brahmanbaria of the then East Bengal (now Bangladesh). His father's name is Siddiqur Rahman Khan. He completed secondary school certificate from Kasba Bi-lateral High School in 1967 and higher secondary school certificate from Bangladesh Agricultural University College in 1969. He graduated in 1973 and obtained a master's degree in 1975 respectively from the Bangladesh Agricultural University in agricultural economics. He received a PhD degree in the same subject from Lincoln College, University of Canterbury in 1983.
