= Nitish Chandra Debnath =

Veterinary scientist and educator

- নীতিশ চন্দ্র দেবনাথ

Founder Principal and Dean of Chittagong Veterinary College
- In office 1996–2006
- In office 2010–2006

Vice-Chancellor of Chittagong Veterinary and Animal Sciences University
- Preceded by: Office Established
- Succeeded by: Abu Saleh Mahfuzul Bari

Personal details
- Education: Bachelor's in Veterinary Medicine (1976) *Master's degree (1977) * Master's in Tropical Veterinary Medicine (1983) *Ph.D. in Animal Virology (1992)
- Alma mater: Bangladesh Agricultural University; University of Edinburgh; University of Surrey
- Occupation: Professor; Veterinary Surgeon; Scientific Officer; Technical Advisor
- Profession: Veterinarian, Academic
- Committees: Central Executive Committee of the Krishibid Institution Bangladesh
- Postdoctoral Training: Japan (1992)

Nitish Chandra Debnath (Bengali: নীতিশ চন্দ্র দেবনাথ, Bengali pronunciation: [nitɪʃ tʃʌndrʌ dɛbnɑθ]) was the first Vice-Chancellor of Chittagong Veterinary and Animal Sciences University, a public university in Chittagong. He was a professor in the university's Department of Microbiology. His tenure as Vice-Chancellor ended on November 6, 2010. He is a member of the Central Executive Committee of the Krishibid Institution Bangladesh.

== Education ==
Debnath obtained a bachelor's in Veterinary Medicine from Bangladesh Agricultural University in 1976. He earned a master's degree from the same university in 1977. In 1983, he also obtained a master's degree in Tropical Veterinary Medicine from the University of Edinburgh. In 1992, he completed a Ph.D. in Animal Virology from the University of Surrey. In the same year, he underwent postdoctoral training in Japan.

== Career ==
In 1979, Debnath joined the Bangladesh Livestock Service, where he served as a Veterinary Surgeon and Scientific Officer until 1986. After that, he joined the Bangladesh Livestock Research Institute as a Senior Scientific Officer, where he remained until 1996.

Debnath then joined the newly established Chittagong Veterinary College, which was then a government veterinary college under the Faculty of Science of the University of Chittagong. He took on the roles of Principal and Dean. In 2006, the college was transformed into a university, and he became the Vice-Chancellor of this newly established institution. He also joined as a professor in the Department of Microbiology and Public Health under the Faculty of Veterinary Medicine.

Debnath taught as a professor until 2018, after which he retired. Since 2011, he has been serving as a Technical Advisor on One Health and Veterinary Education for the Food and Agriculture Organization of the United Nations. He has been involved with One Health in Bangladesh since its inception and serves as the National Coordinator of One Health Bangladesh.
