= Chittagong Veterinary and Animal Sciences University =

Public university in Bangladesh

Coordinates: 22.3639°N 91.8040°E

Chattogram Veterinary and Animal Sciences University
- চট্টগ্রাম ভেটেরিনারি ও এনিম্যাল সাইন্সেস বিশ্ববিদ্যালয়
- Crest of CVASU
- Other name: CVASU
- Former name: Chittagong Government Veterinary College
- Type: Public research
- Established: 1996; 30 years ago (College); 7 August 2006; 20 years ago (University)
- Accreditation: Bangladesh Livestock Research Institute; Krishibid Institution Bangladesh
- Affiliations: University Grants Commission (UGC)
- Chancellor: President Mirza Fakhrul Islam Alamgir
- Vice-Chancellor: Mohammad Lutfur Rahman
- Students: 1200+
- Undergraduates: 1000+
- Postgraduates: 150+
- Doctoral students: 10+
- Location: Zakir Hossain Road, Khulshi, Chittagong, Bangladesh
- Campus: Urban, 20 acres (8.1 ha)
- Website: cvasu.ac.bd

University rankings

Regional – Overall
- QS Asia: 1101-1200 (2026)

Chittagong Veterinary and Animal Sciences University (CVASU) (Bengali: চট্টগ্রাম ভেটেরিনারি ও এনিম্যাল সাইন্সেস বিশ্ববিদ্যালয়) is a public research university in Chittagong, Bangladesh. It is the only specialised veterinary university in Bangladesh. It is located at Khulshi, Chittagong. Locally it is known as Veterinary University. It was initially established as Chittagong Government Veterinary College (CGVC) in 1995 and later became a university in 2006.

CVASU has established the first Animal Blood Bank in Bangladesh at the SA Kaderi Teaching Veterinary Hospital. It has also set up the country's first Anatomy Museum to support veterinary education and research. The university also established the first pet hospital in Bangladesh, located in Dhaka.

== History ==
Foundation stone laying ceremony of CGVC; seated are Abdullah Al Noman and Khaleda Zia, 1995

In 1995–1996, the Bangladesh government established two veterinary colleges in Sylhet and Chittagong. Later, two more veterinary colleges were established at Dinajpur and Barisal. The initial name of the Veterinary College in Chittagong was Chittagong Government Veterinary College, abbreviated as CGVC. The institute started its journey in January 1997 as a college under the University of Chittagong with 50 students. The University of Chittagong transformed the college into a separate faculty with the permission of the University Grants Commission for the large syllabus of the college. At that time there was no agricultural university or veterinary university in the whole of Chittagong. As a result, there was a strong demand to transform CGVC into a separate university. Various journalists and academics in Chittagong agree with this demand. This demand took the form of a movement. The movement was led by Yusuf Chowdhury, a social worker from Chittagong and chairman of Dainik Purbokone. For his contribution, a building in CVASU was named as Yusuf Chowdhury building. As a result of this movement, in 2005 the Prime Minister's Office ordered the transformation of CGVC into a university. Following this, the then Prime Minister Begum Khaleda Zia inaugurated it on 2 February 2006, as Chittagong Veterinary and Animal Sciences University. It was later launched on 7 August 2006, through an ordinance. At first the university only started its journey with the Faculty of Veterinary Medicine. At present, the university conducts its academic activities with a total of four faculties, including three more faculties, namely Food Science Technology, Fisheries, Biotechnology and Genetic Engineering.

== List of vice-chancellors ==
Vice-chancellors of universities in Bangladesh are selected by the president of Bangladesh. CVASU has had four vice-chancellors since 2006. Among them, Goutam Buddha Das had two terms in the vice-chancellor's office. The first three vice-chancellors received their degrees from Bangladesh Agricultural University. The fourth vice-chancellor, Lutful Ahasan, is an alumnus of CVASU.

Vice-Chancellors
Name	Time
Nitish Chandra Debnath	5 November 2006 – 4 November 2010
Abusaleh Mahfuzul Bari	24 November 2010 – 23 November 2014
Goutam Buddha Das	9 December 2014 – 8 December 2018, 9 December 2018 – 8 December 2022
A.S.M. Lutful Ahasan	1 January 2023 – 15 September 2024
Mohammad Lutfur Rahman	2024–present

== Campuses ==
=== Main Campus ===
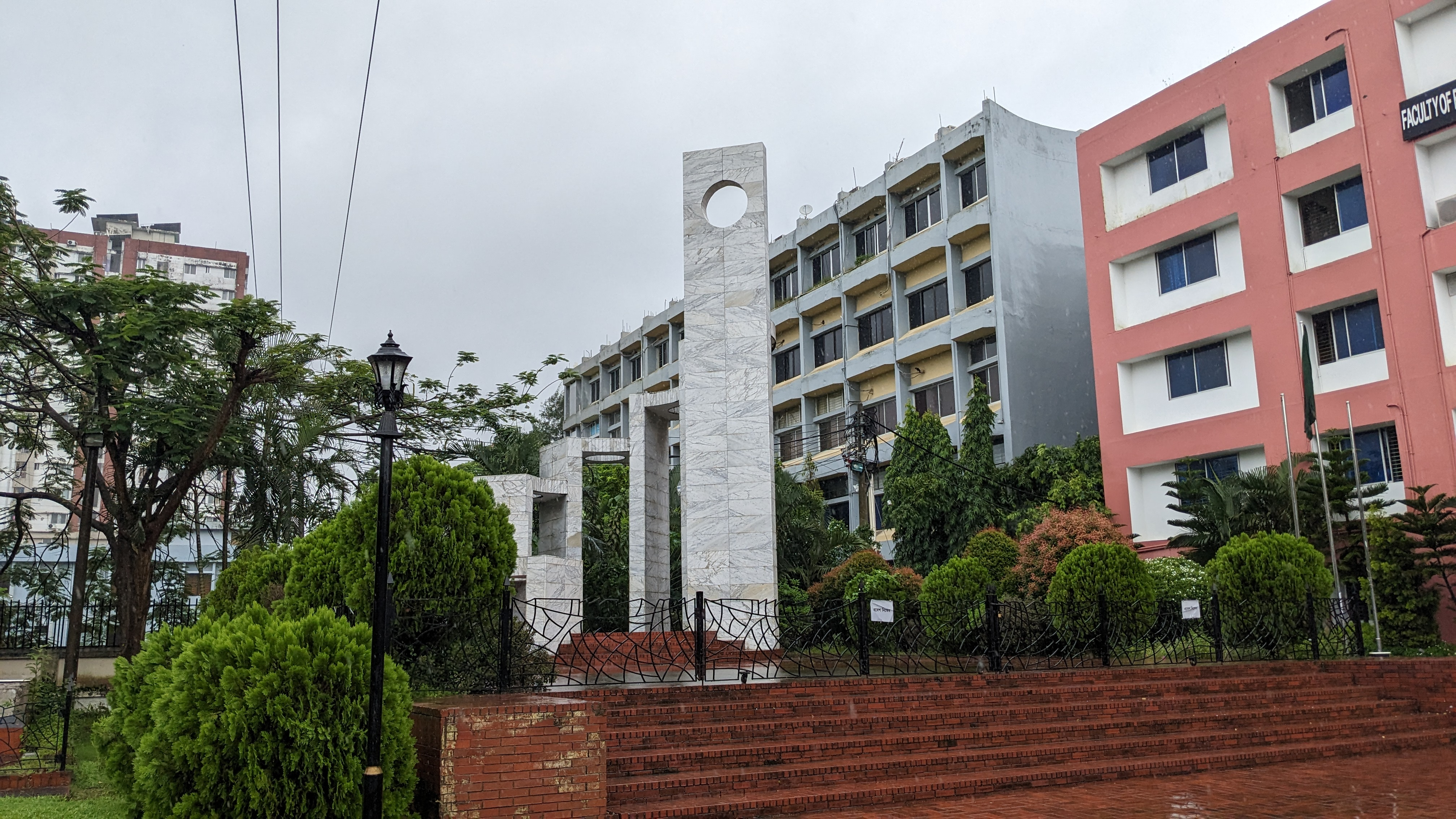
CVASU Shaheed Minar

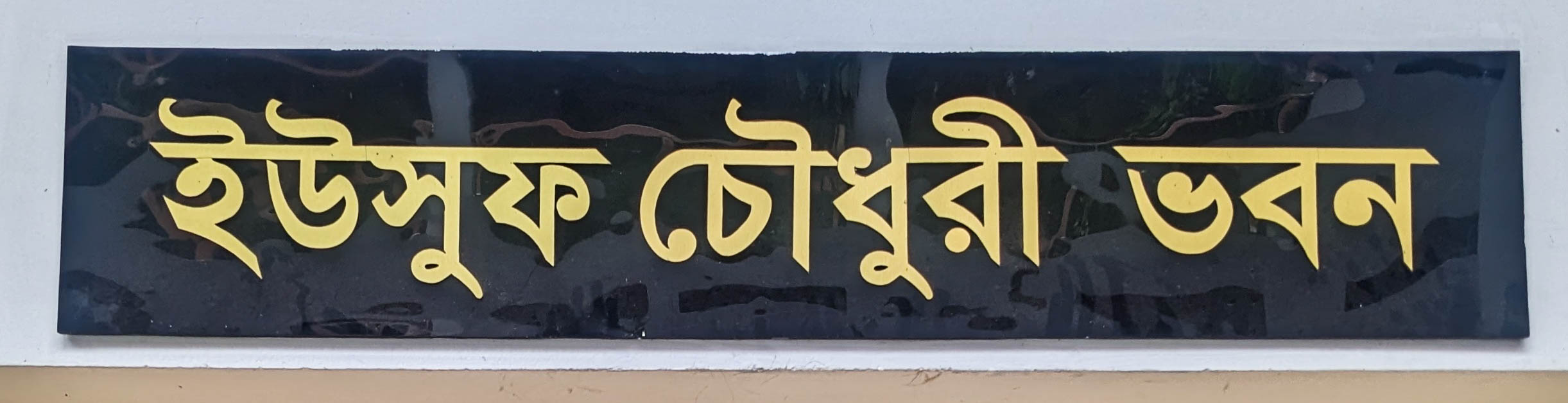
A building at CVASU has been named after Yousuf Chowdhury in his memory

The main campus of Chattogram Veterinary and Animal Sciences University (CVASU) is located in the Khulshi area of Chittagong city. It has been in operation since 1995, following the foundation stone laid by the then Prime Minister Khaleda Zia. The campus hosts three faculties: Veterinary Medicine, Food Science and Technology, and Fisheries. There are two student residential halls on the main campus, Abdullah Al Noman Hall for male students and Bijoy 71 Hall for female students. The campus includes a Shaheed Minar commemorating the martyrs of the 1952 Language Movement. The S.A. Quaderi Teaching Veterinary Hospital is also located on this campus. Additional facilities include a branch of Janata Bank, a medical center, and a central field used for student sports and recreational activities. A garden named CVASU Garden has also been recently established on the campus.

==== Anatomy Museum ====
It is the first anatomy museum in the country. The museum was built in 2016 under the University Grants Commission's HECAP project. The museum is overseen by the university's Department of Anatomy and Histology. Horses, cows, deer, camels, ducks, goats, sheep, pigeons, crocodiles, snakes, lizards, pigs, ostriches and monkeys are preserved in this museum. There are 30 stuffed animals, 20 animal models, 500 specimens of formaldehyde, 2000 different types of bones, 3000 different slides and stills of 30 scientists. Some dried soft limbs have also been preserved in the museum.

==== Fisheries Museum ====
The Fisheries Museum at Chattogram Veterinary and Animal Sciences University (CVASU) is located on the ground floor of the university's administrative building and was established by the Faculty of Fisheries in 2018. Covering approximately 2,500 square feet, the museum houses around 200 species of indigenous freshwater fish collected from various rivers, lakes, canals, and wetlands across Bangladesh, as well as 150 species of marine fish from Chittagong and Cox's Bazar. These specimens are preserved in glass jars using chemicals and displayed across two rooms. Additional sections include a room for hard-shelled aquatic animals such as mollusks, snails, and corals, another for marine and freshwater aquatic plants, and replicas of traditional fishing boats. A 670 cubic feet aquarium is also present to represent an aquatic ecosystem, featuring 25–30 species of fish. Each specimen is labeled with its scientific name, local name, common name, and key characteristics.

==== Shahedul Alam (S.A.) Qaderi Teaching Veterinary Hospital ====
After the establishment of Chattogram Government Veterinary College in 1996, a small-scale veterinary hospital was launched adjacent to the college in 1998 under the Department of Medicine and Surgery to provide practical education in animal health, treatment, and management. In 2002, it was officially named Shahedul Alam (S.A.) Qaderi Teaching Veterinary Hospital. From 2007, the hospital expanded its facilities and began offering animal treatment services independently. Initially operating under a small tin shed, the hospital has gradually developed into a modern facility. It provides students with hands-on training in the treatment and care of various animals, including livestock such as cattle, goats, buffaloes, and horses; companion animals like dogs, cats, rabbits, turtles, and birds; as well as poultry and some wild species. Training also includes surgical procedures, disease diagnosis, and therapeutic practices. The university hospital contributes to this by offering practical training for students while providing services to animal owners. Located in Chittagong city, the hospital treats an average of 60 to 70 animals daily from both the metropolitan area and nearby districts. Students work with faculty members to assist in diagnosis and treatment.

==== Student Halls ====
There are a total of 4 residential halls across CVASU's urban and Hathazari campuses. During the establishment of CVASU, former Fisheries Minister Bir Muktijoddha Abdullah Al Noman and the then Director General of the Department of Fisheries Dr. Nazir Ahmed played significant roles. The university's halls have been named in their honor.

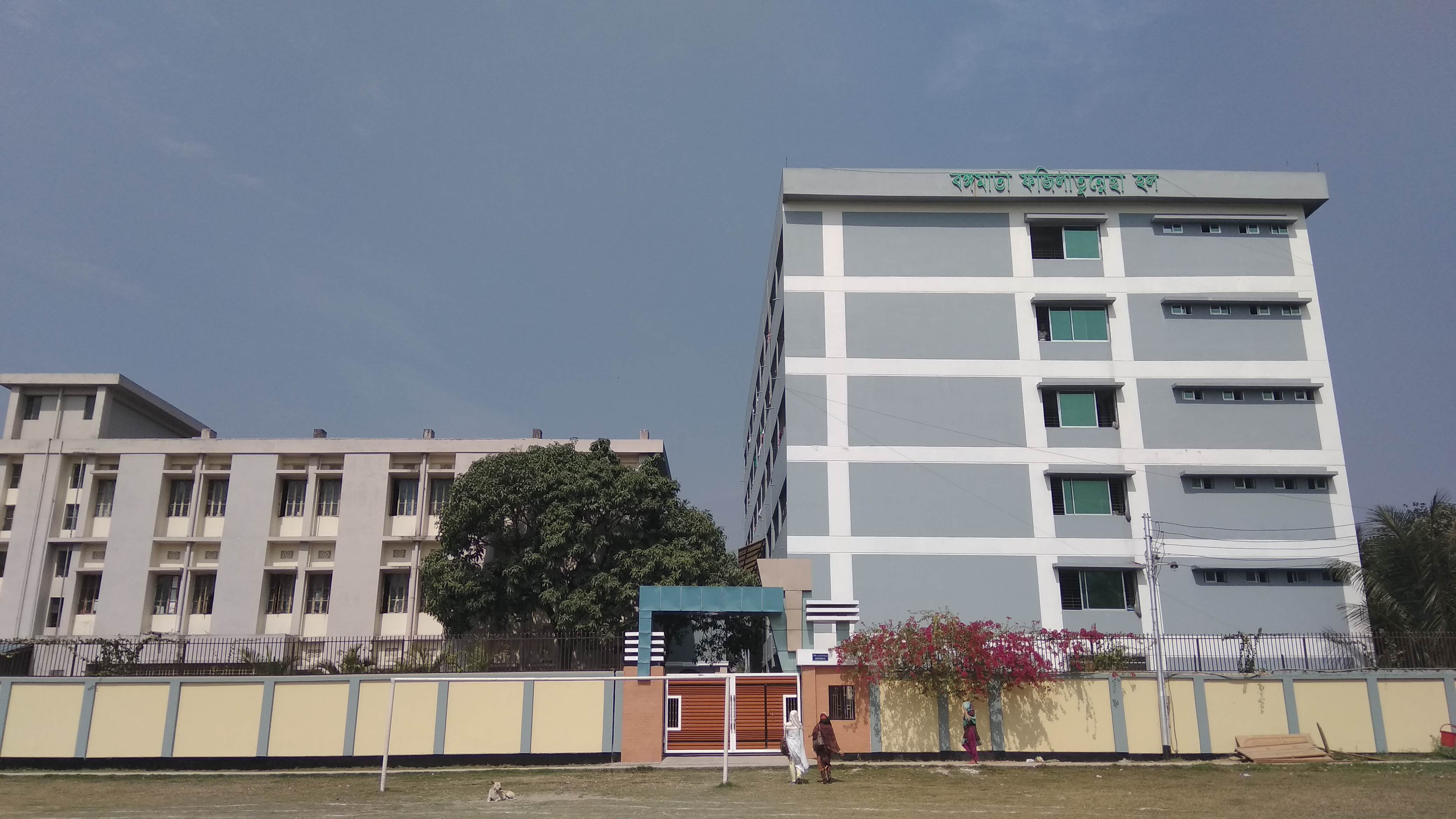
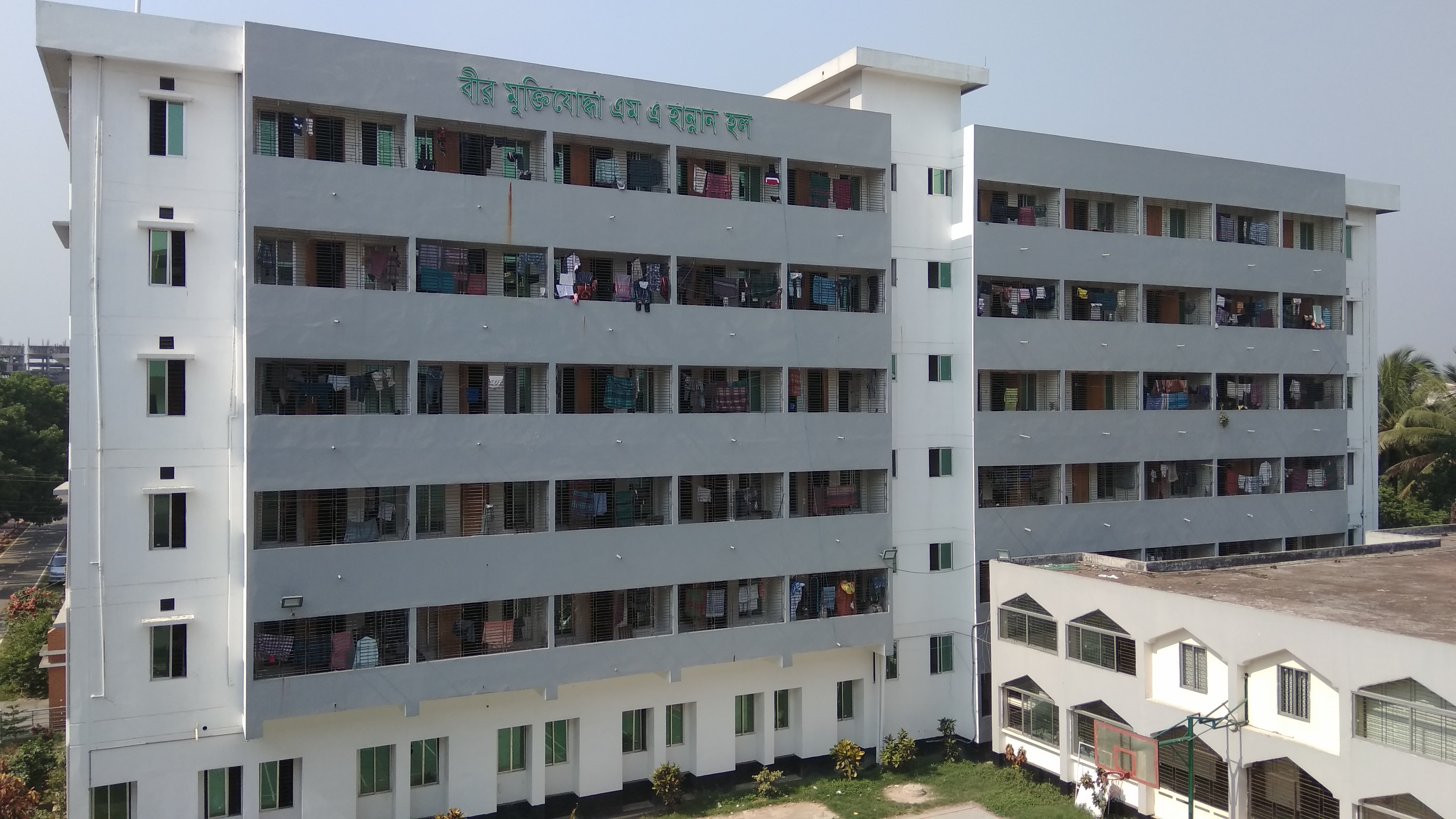
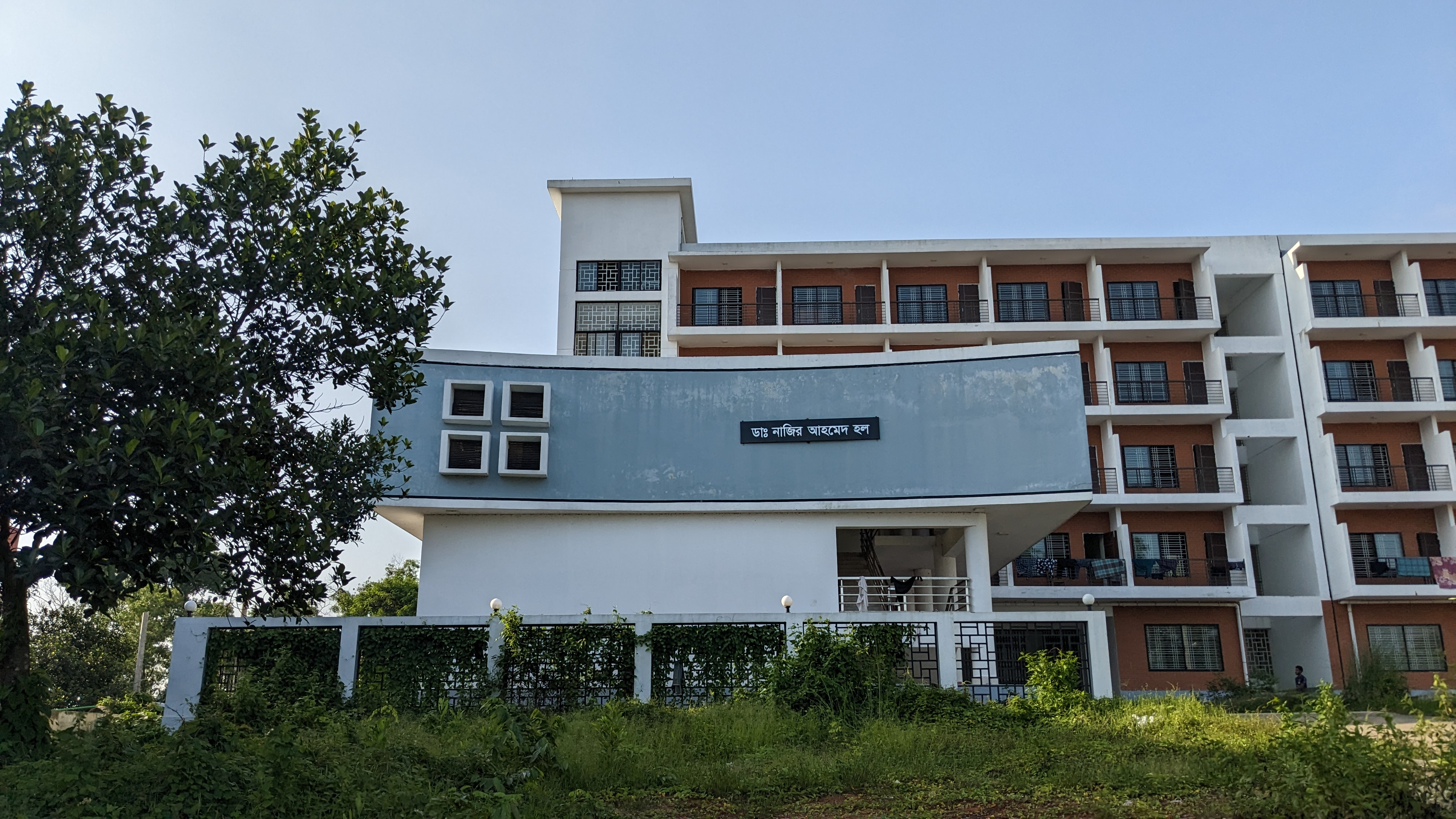
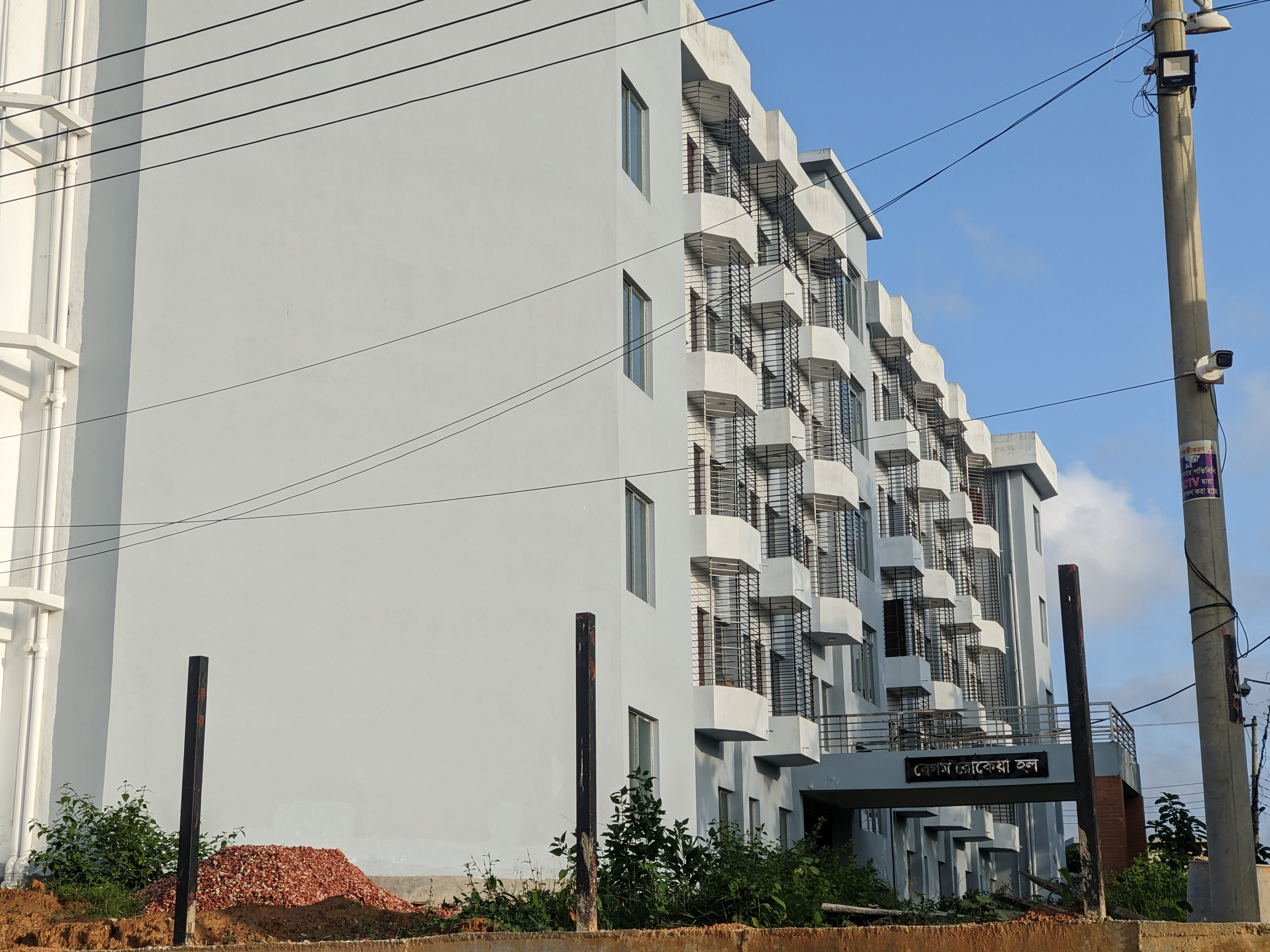
Clockwise: Bijoy 2024 Hall, Bir Muktijoddha Abdullah Al Noman Hall, Begum Rokeya Hall (Hathazari Campus), Dr. Nazir Ahmed Hall (Hathazari Campus)
- Bir Muktijoddha Abdullah Al Noman Hall
- Bijoy 2024 Hall
- Dr. Nazir Ahmed Hall (Hathazari Campus)
- Begum Rokeya Hall (Hathazari Campus)

=== Cox's Bazar Outreached Campus ===
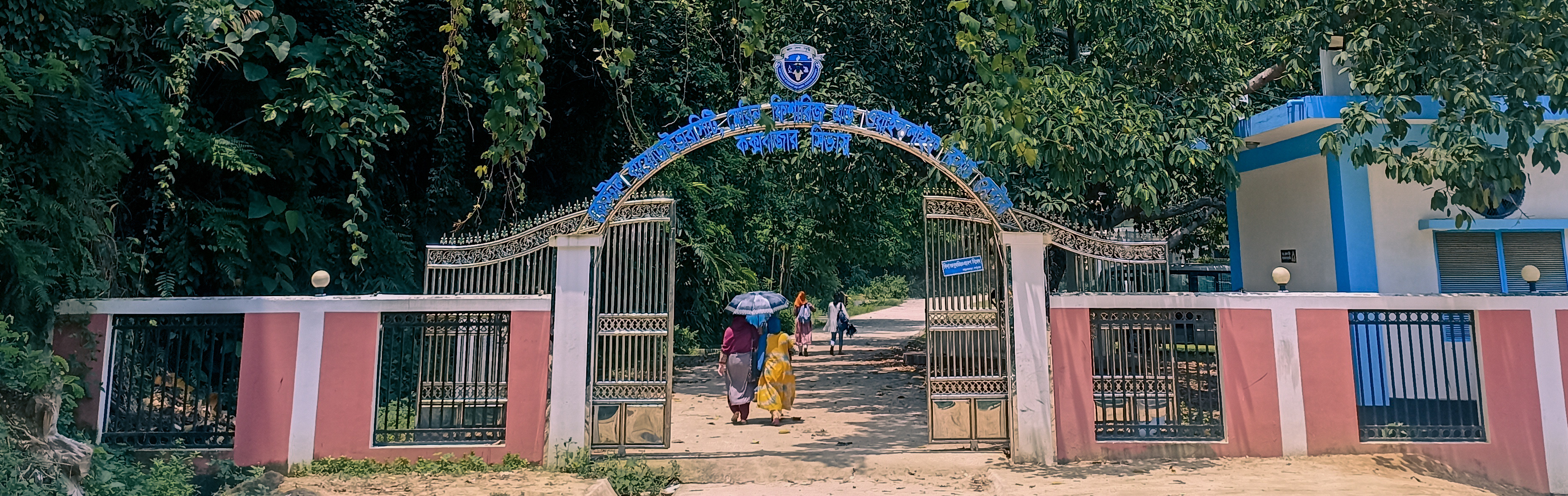
Entrance of Cox's Bazar Outreached Campus

The campus is actually a research-based campus of the university which is mainly focused on sea-related projects. Construction of hatchery and filtration unit is going on the campus. Fisheries department of CVASU also began crab farming in the campus.

=== Hathazari research and farm based campus ===
It is a research and farm-based campus of the university which is located at Hathazari Upazila in Chittagong. Two new institutes, two new faculty will be opened at the campus. 180 crore bdt (taka) will be spent to construct the campus. Currently, there are two residential halls for students: Dr. Nazir Ahmed Hall for male students and Begum Rokeya Hall for female students. In 2024, CVASU established a new Teaching Veterinary Hospital on the Hathazari campus, following the SA Kaderi and Purbachal hospitals, with a focus on livestock treatment.

=== Teaching and Training Pet Hospital and Research Center ===
It is the country's first-ever pet hospital. Following the S.A. Quaderi Teaching Veterinary Hospital in Chittagong, CVASU established its second facility, the Teaching and Training Pet Hospital and Research Centre (Dhaka Pet Hospital) in Purbachal, Dhaka. This specialized hospital, dedicated to companion animals, was founded in 2018. It functions as a center for veterinary training and research and treats an average of 40–50 pet animals daily. Both hospitals are equipped with medical technologies such as X-ray, ultrasonography, gaseous anesthesia, endoscopy, dental care, and ophthalmic treatment facilities.

== Admission ==
Undergraduate admission is conducted through a cluster system admission test where a single exam is taken for seven universities which provide education in the field of agricultural sciences. These are Chittagong Veterinary and Animal Sciences University, Bangabandhu Sheikh Mujibur Rahman Agricultural University, Bangladesh Agricultural University, Sher-e-Bangla Agricultural University, Sylhet Agricultural University, Khulna Agricultural University and Patuakhali Science and Technology University. The subject choice and campus choice depends on the student's merit position and personal preference.

== Institutes ==
=== Poultry Research and Training Center (PRTC) ===
The Poultry Research and Training Centre (PRTC) was established on 11 March 2008 with the financial support from Agricultural Sector Programme Support (ASPS) II of DANIDA at the Chittagong Veterinary and Animal Sciences University (CVASU) campus, within the legal framework of the University Act 2006 (Act 30 of 2006). PRTC is an autonomous institution, in accordance with the provision of the University Act 16 July 2006. Muhammad Kabirul Islam Khan, from Department of Genetics and Animal Breeding, was invented a new breed crossed between Faomi and indigenous chicken which will grow rapidly as Faomi but the taste of the meat will as the indigenous chicken.

=== Institute of Coastal Biodiversity, Marine Fisheries and Wildlife Conservation ===
This institution located at Cox's Bazar outreach campus of the university.

=== The Institute of Food Safety and Nutrition (IFSN) ===
The Institute of Food Safety and Nutrition (IFSN) is an independent institute under CVASU. It focuses on food science, processing, preservation, and food safety surveillance. The institute offers higher education, research, and technology development related to these areas.

== Notable people ==
=== Alumni ===
- Salma Sultana, recipient of the 2020 the Norman Borlaug Award for Field Research and Application
- ASM Lutful Ahasan, former VC of CVASU

=== Faculty ===
- Goutam Buddha Das, won the 2022 Ekushey Padak in education

== Gallery ==
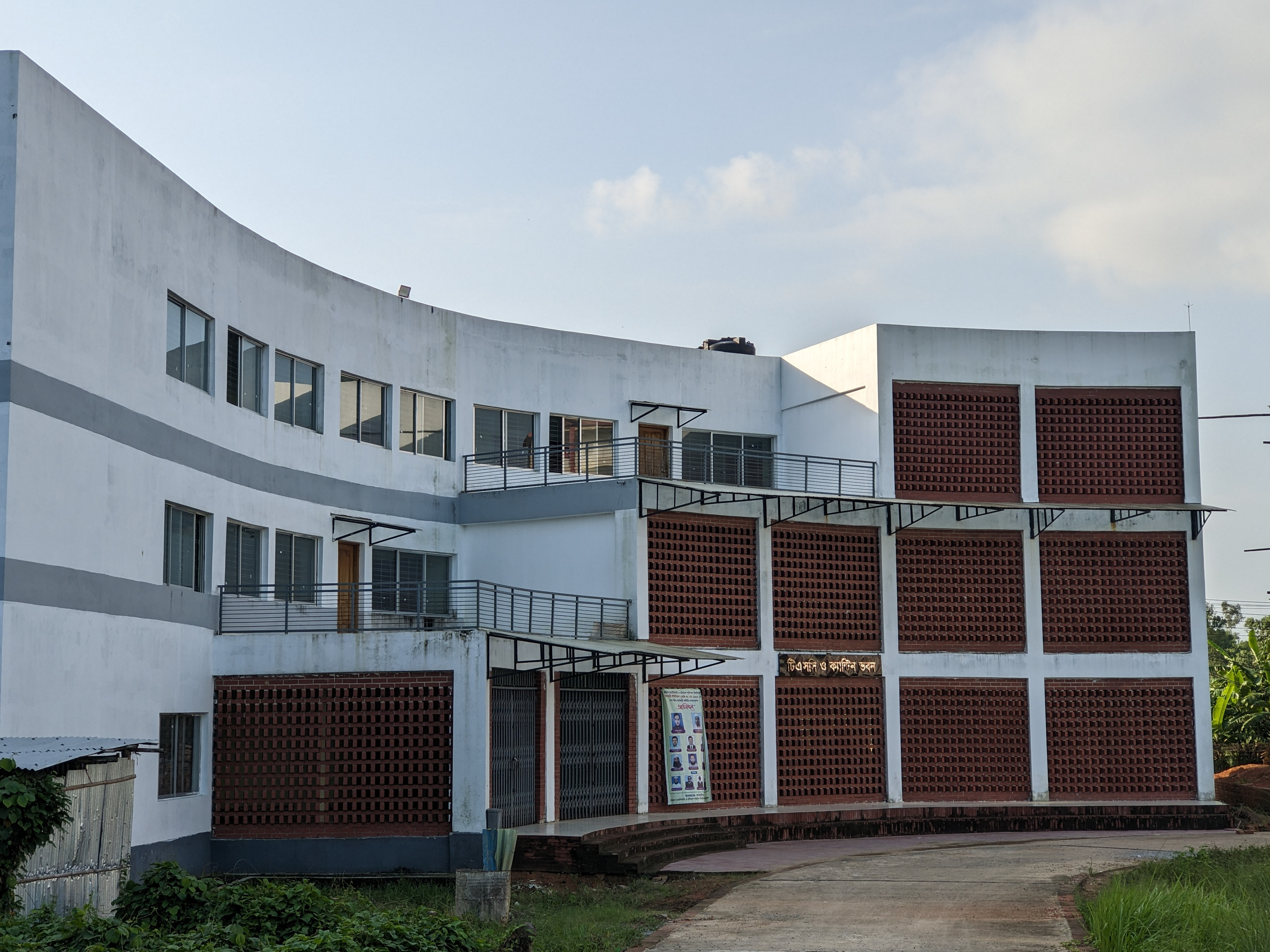
TSC and Canteen Buildings, Hathazari Campus

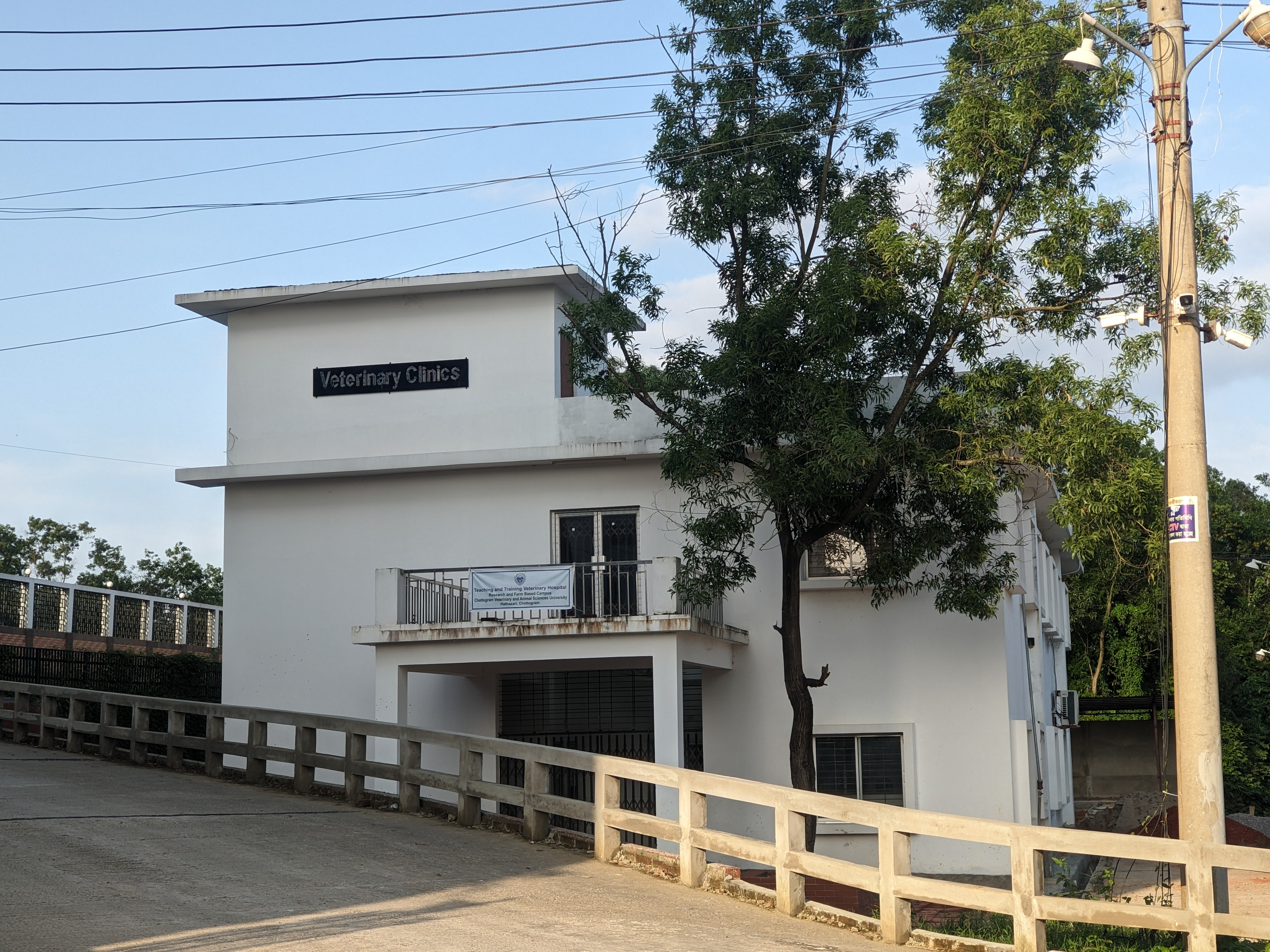
Veterinary Clinics, Hathazari Campus

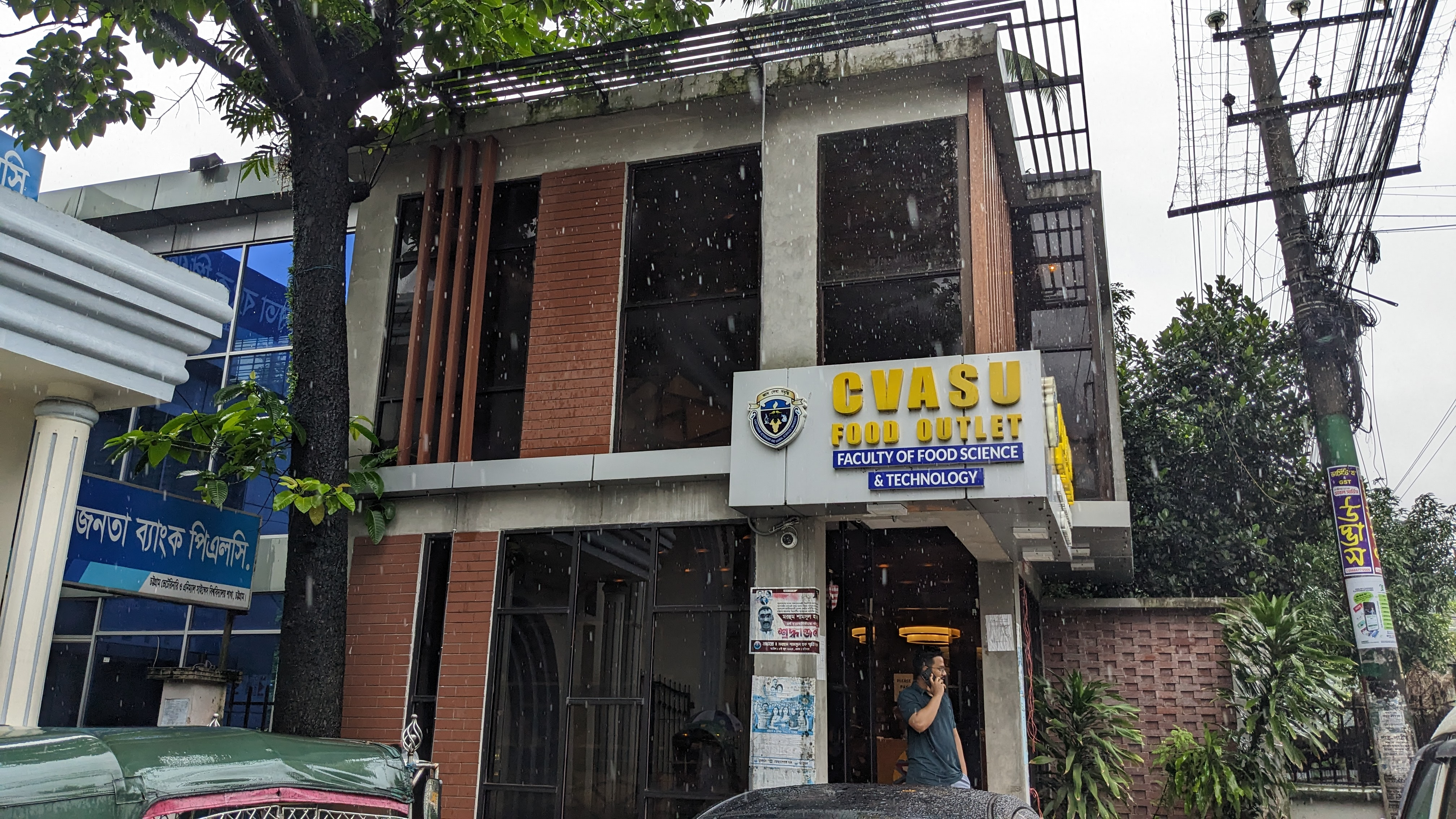
CVASU Food Outlet

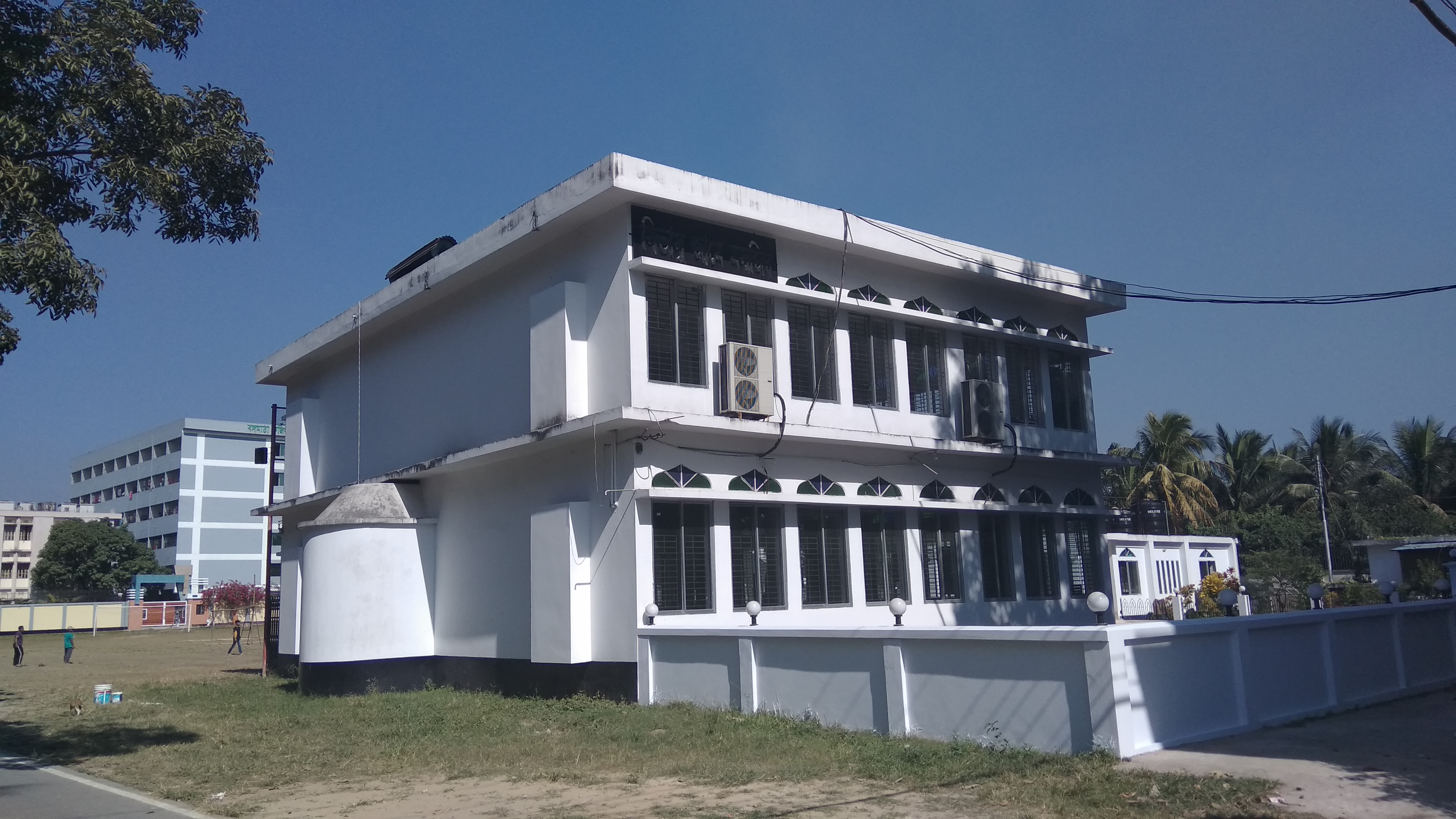
CVASU Jame mosque

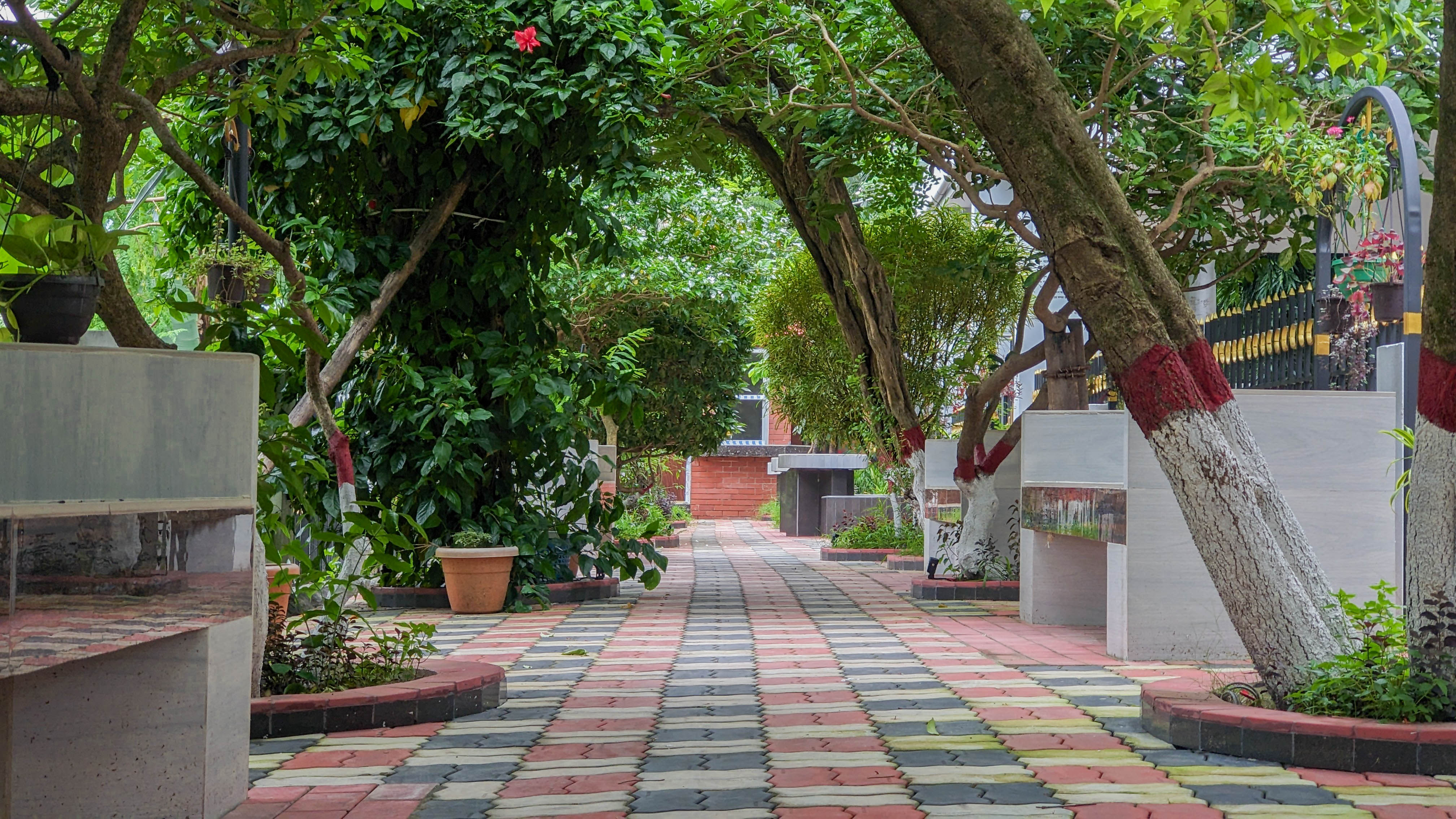
CVASU Garden

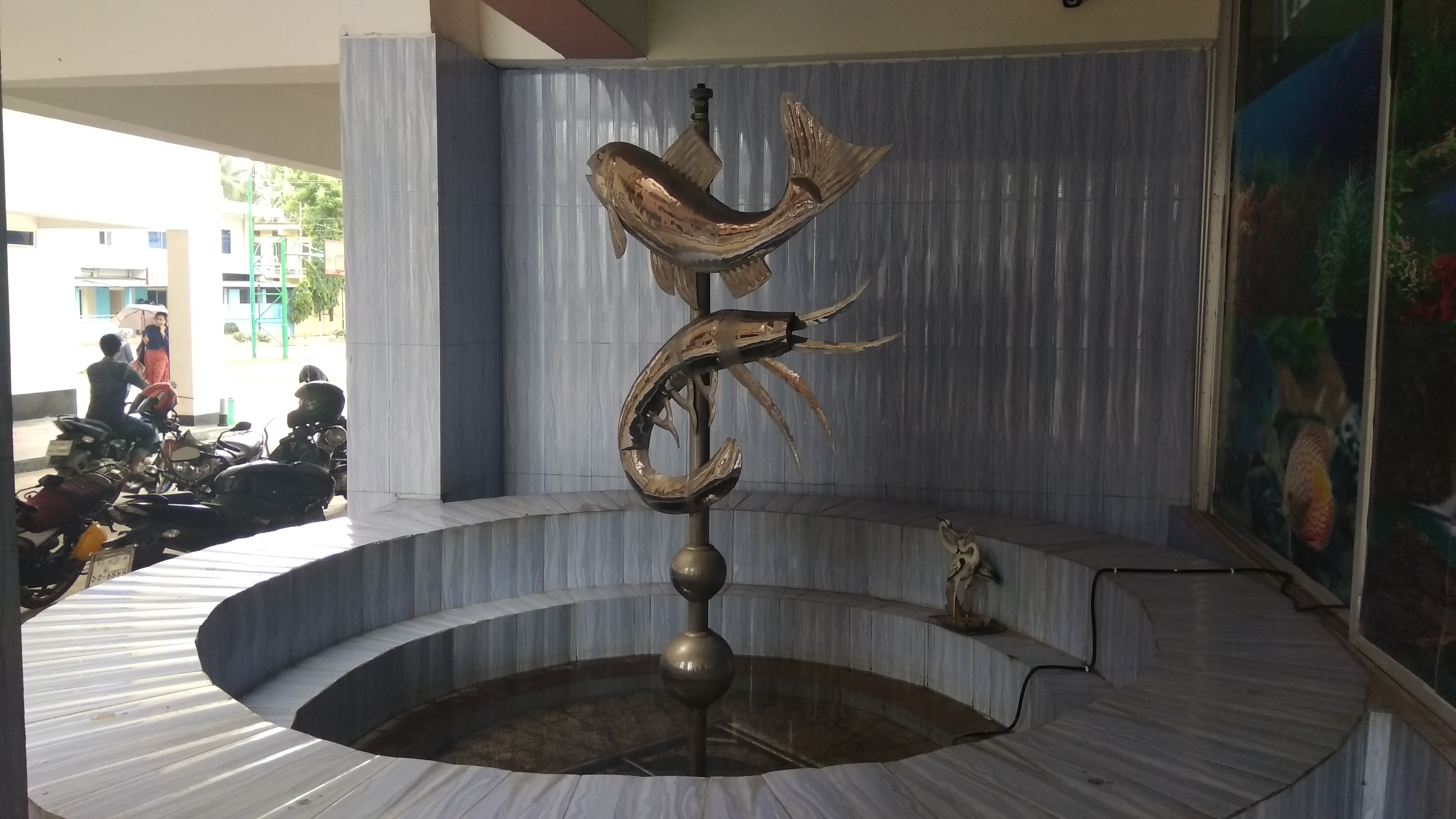
Fisheries building's sculpture

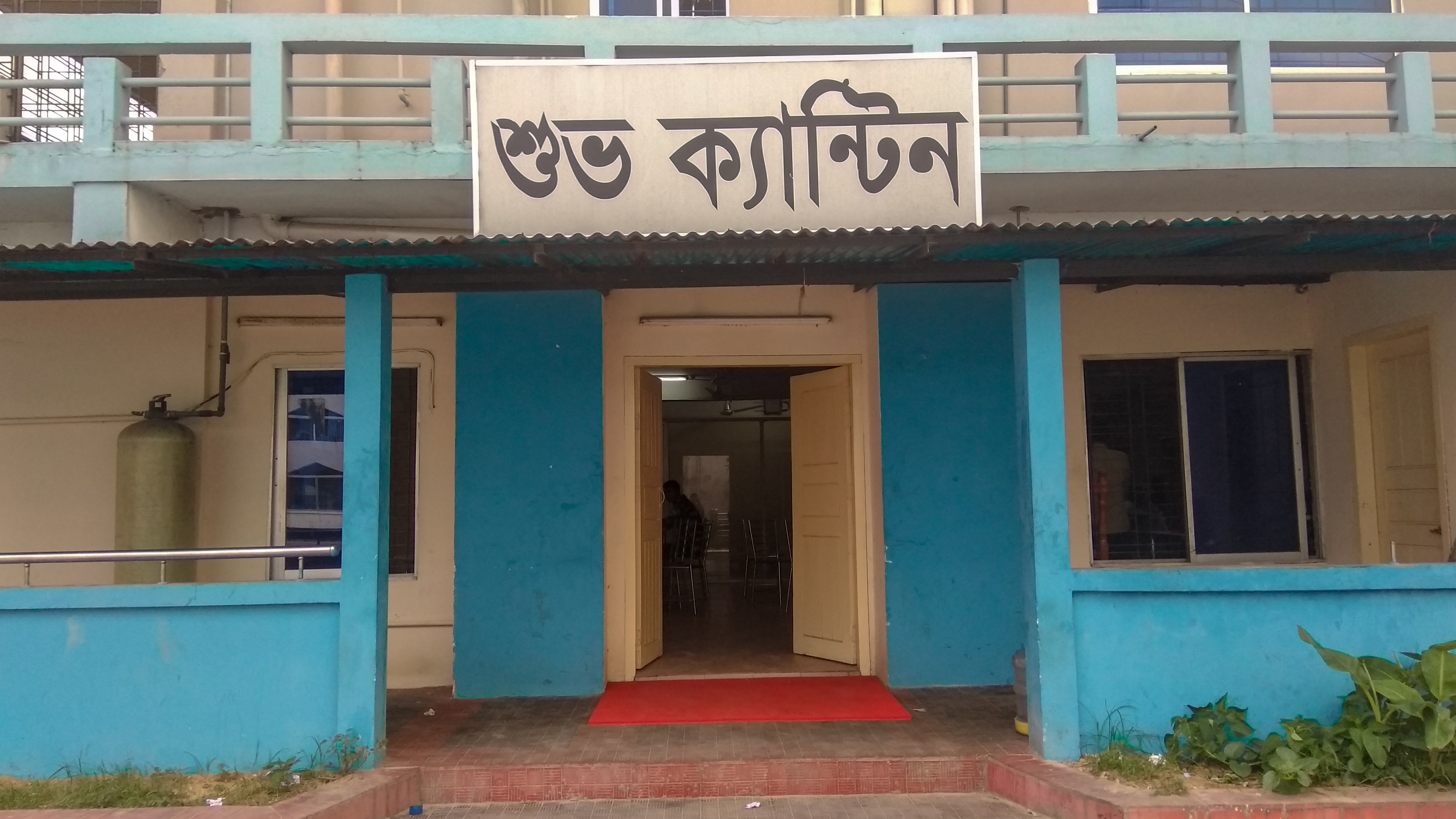
Shuvo Canteen

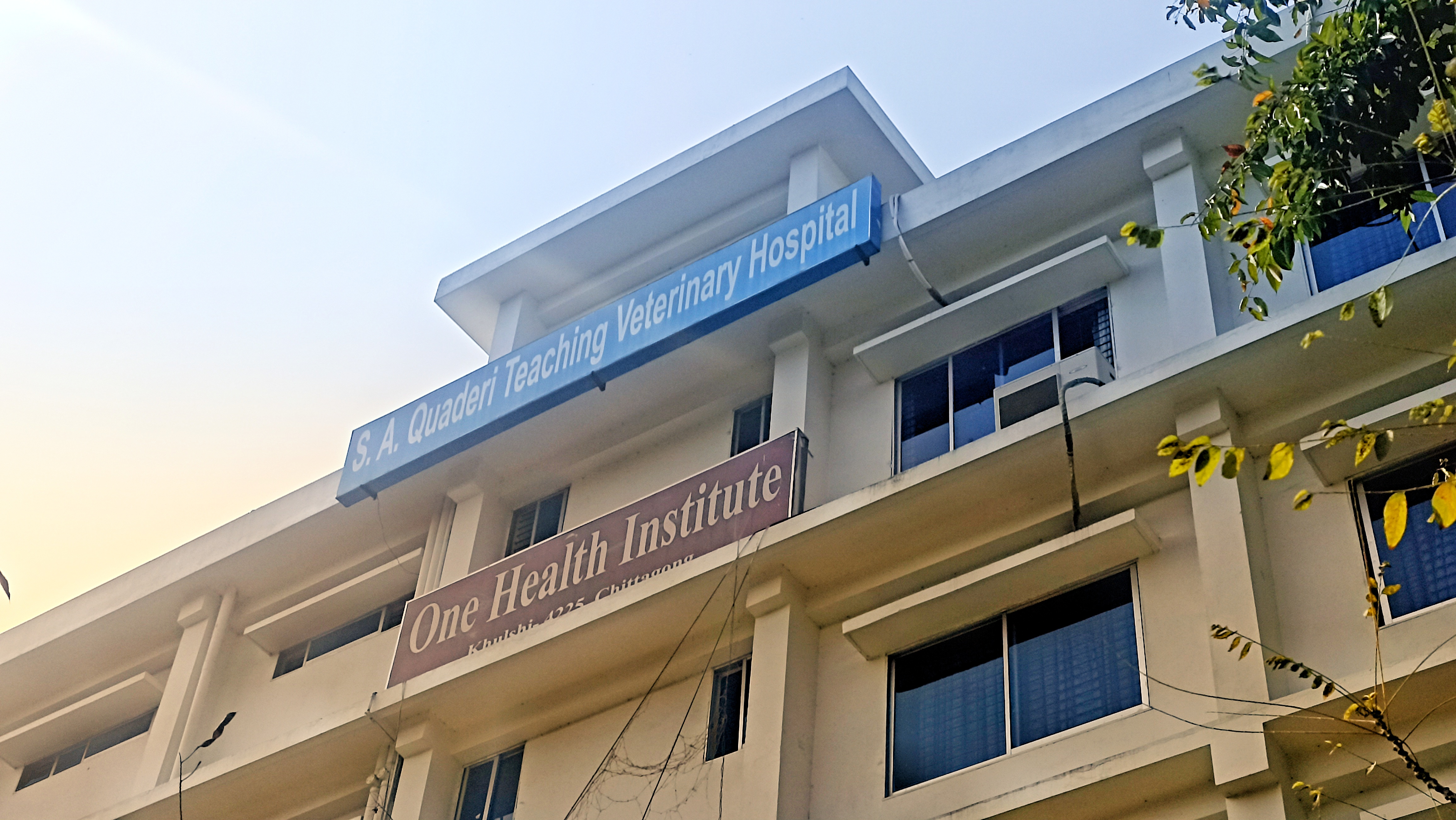
SA Kaderi Veterinary Teaching Hospital and One Health Institute are also visible

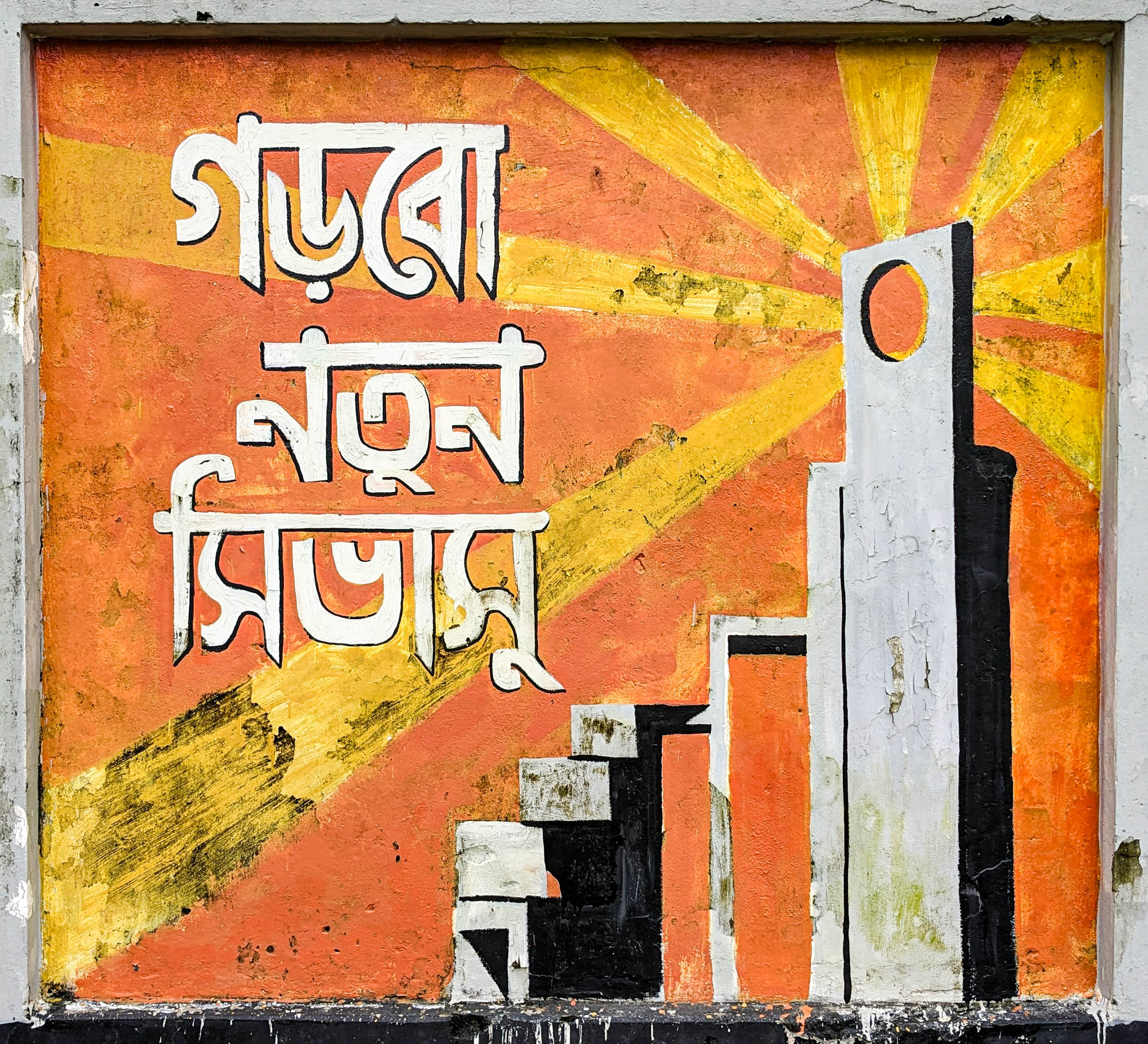
Wall art in the campus
