= Darbeshpur =

Village in West Bengal, India

Darbeshpur Derbeshpur
- Village
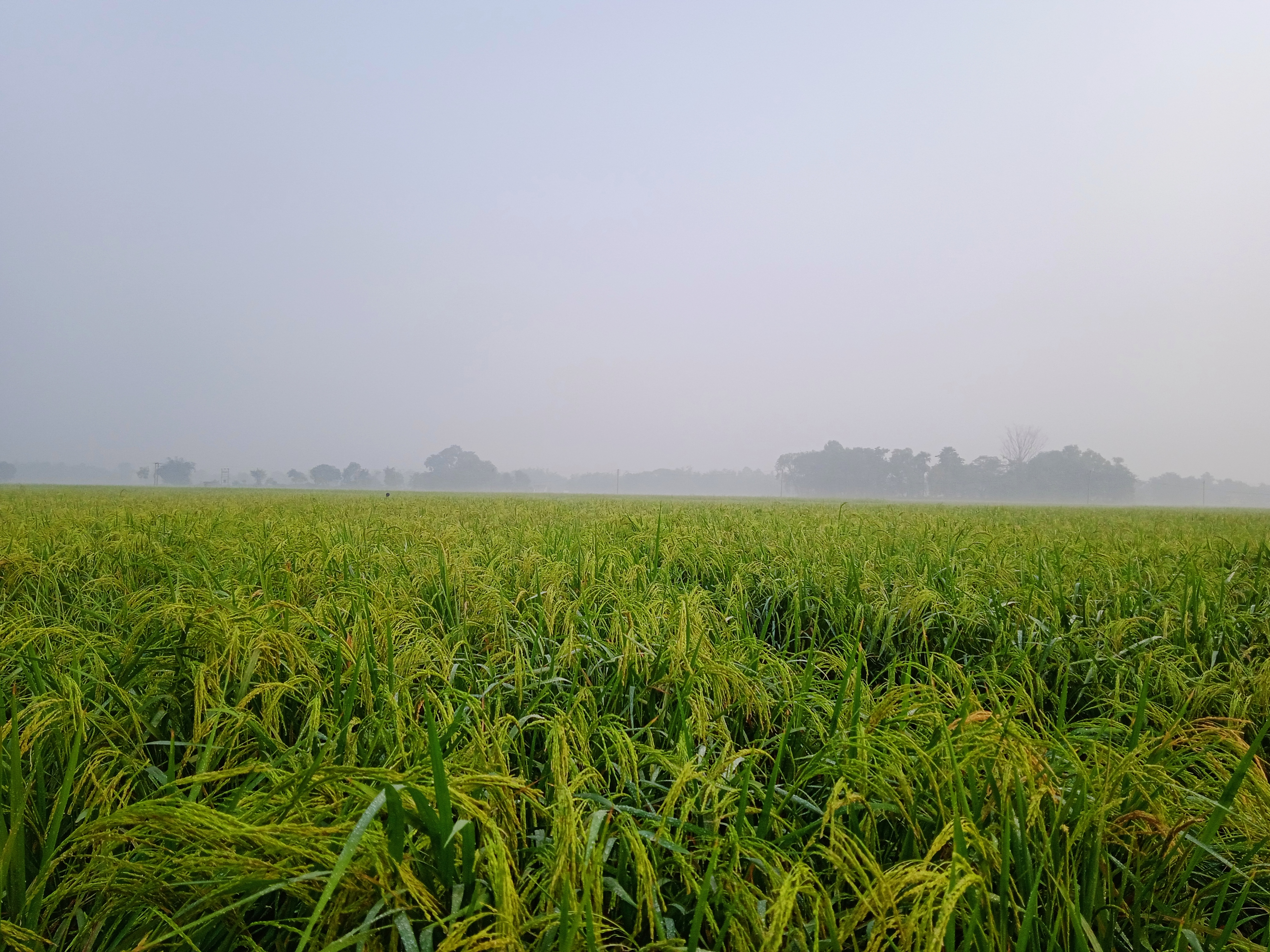
- Nickname: Darbesh
- Interactive map of Darbeshpur
- Location in West Bengal, India Darbeshpur (India) Darbeshpur (Asia)
- Coordinates: 22.9829°N 87.8009°E
- Country: India
- State: West Bengal
- District: Purba Bardhaman

Government
  - Type: Gram Panchayat
  - Body: Painta Gram Panchayat

Area
  - Village: 1.1 km^{2} (0.42 sq mi)
  - Land: 0.9 km^{2} (0.35 sq mi)
  - Water: 0.2 km^{2} (0.077 sq mi)
  - Urban: 0.2 km^{2} (0.077 sq mi)
  - Rural: 1 km^{2} (0.39 sq mi)
- Elevation: 20 m (66 ft)
- Highest elevation: 30 m (98 ft)
- Lowest elevation: 2 m (6.6 ft)

Population (2011)
  - Village: 786
  - Estimate (December 2025): 1,200
  - Density: 238/km^{2} (620/sq mi)
  - Urban: 100+
  - Rural: 600+

Languages
  - Official: Bengali, English
- Time zone: UTC+5:30 (IST)
- PIN: 713427
- Telephone: 03451
- Vehicle registration: WB42,WB41,WB18,WB17,WB15
- Vidhan Sabha constituency: Raina
- Lok Sabha constituency: Bardhaman Purba
- Website: purbabardhaman.gov.in

Darbeshpur or Derbeshpur is a village located in Purba Bardhaman district in West Bengal, India. Its correct pronunciation in English is "Darveshpur". It is located in Raina II block in Purba Bardhaman district in West West Bengal, India.

== Demographics ==
Languages spoken in Darbeshpur
1. Bengali (98.9%)
2. Santali (1.00%)
3. Others (0.10%)

Bengali is the most used language here followed by Hindi and Santali.

== Food ==
Rasgulla is most popular sweet in this region.

== Climate ==
The Köppen Climate Classification sub-type for this climate is "Aw" (tropical savanna climate).

Climate data for Darbeshpur (1991 to 2020)
Month	Jan	Feb	Mar	Apr	May	Jun	Jul	Aug	Sep	Oct	Nov	Dec	Year
Record high °F (°C)	97.9 (36.6)	101.8 (38.8)	104.7 (40.4)	114.8 (46.0)	115.7 (46.5)	113.4 (45.2)	103.6 (39.8)	99.0 (37.2)	100.4 (38.0)	96.8 (36.0)	95.0 (35.0)	91.4 (33.0)	115.7 (46.5)
Mean daily maximum °F (°C)	77.5 (25.3)	84.9 (29.4)	92.1 (33.4)	97.9 (36.6)	97.9 (36.6)	95.7 (35.4)	91.4 (33.0)	91.0 (32.8)	90.7 (32.6)	90.0 (32.2)	86.5 (30.3)	80.4 (26.9)	90.1 (32.3)
Mean daily minimum °F (°C)	53.4 (11.9)	61.5 (16.4)	68.5 (20.3)	76.1 (24.5)	78.1 (25.6)	79.2 (26.2)	78.6 (25.9)	78.1 (25.6)	77.0 (25.0)	73.9 (23.3)	64.2 (17.9)	56.5 (13.6)	71.1 (21.7)
Record low °F (°C)	39.9 (4.4)	42.6 (5.9)	53.1 (11.7)	58.3 (14.6)	59.7 (15.4)	65.5 (18.6)	66.9 (19.4)	62.6 (17.0)	60.8 (16.0)	59.7 (15.4)	49.6 (9.8)	39.9 (4.4)	39.9 (4.4)
Average rainfall inches (mm)	0.37 (9.3)	0.85 (21.7)	1.15 (29.2)	2.37 (60.2)	3.67 (93.3)	8.53 (216.7)	12.29 (312.1)	10.46 (265.7)	8.70 (221.0)	4.61 (117.0)	0.39 (9.8)	0.25 (6.3)	53.64 (1,362.4)
Average rainy days	0.8	1.7	2.2	3.1	5.8	10.3	15.1	13.9	11.2	5.8	0.8	0.6	71.2
Average relative humidity (%) (at 17:30 IST)	61	62	59	62	65	73	81	80	81	78	67	61	70
Source: Indian Metreological Department

== Transportation Services ==
Public Bus Stand-Within The Village.

Private Bus Stand-Within The Village.

Nearest Railway Station-Arambagh Railway Station

Nearest Airport-Kazi Nazrul Islam Airport in Andal

Cab Service-Within 8-10 Kilometers.

== Schools ==
- Belar Das Para Primary School
- Bhurkunda-Belar High School
- Canvas Art School
- Darbeshpur Primary School.
- Painta High School

== Healthcare ==
There is one Primary Health Centre in Darbeshpur with 2 beds.

== Fauna ==
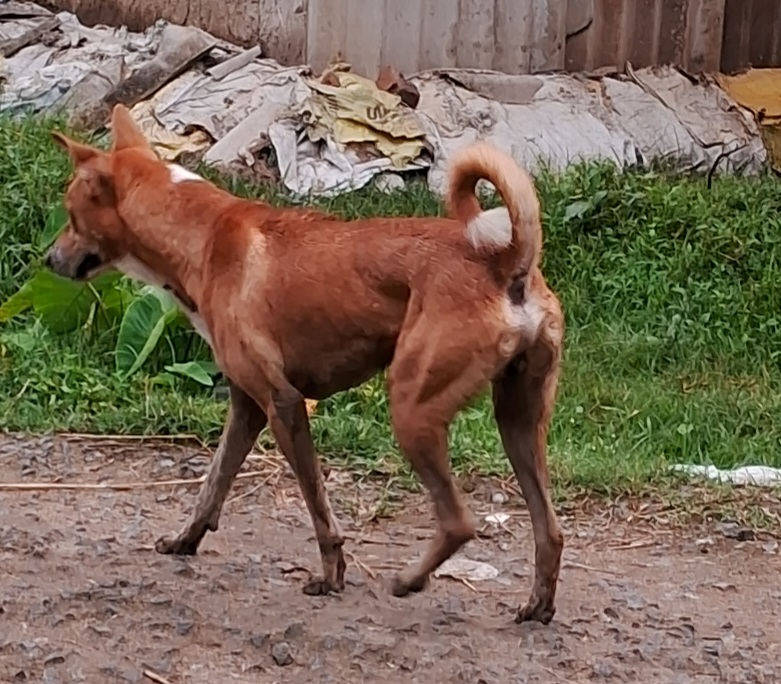
Indian Pariah Dog

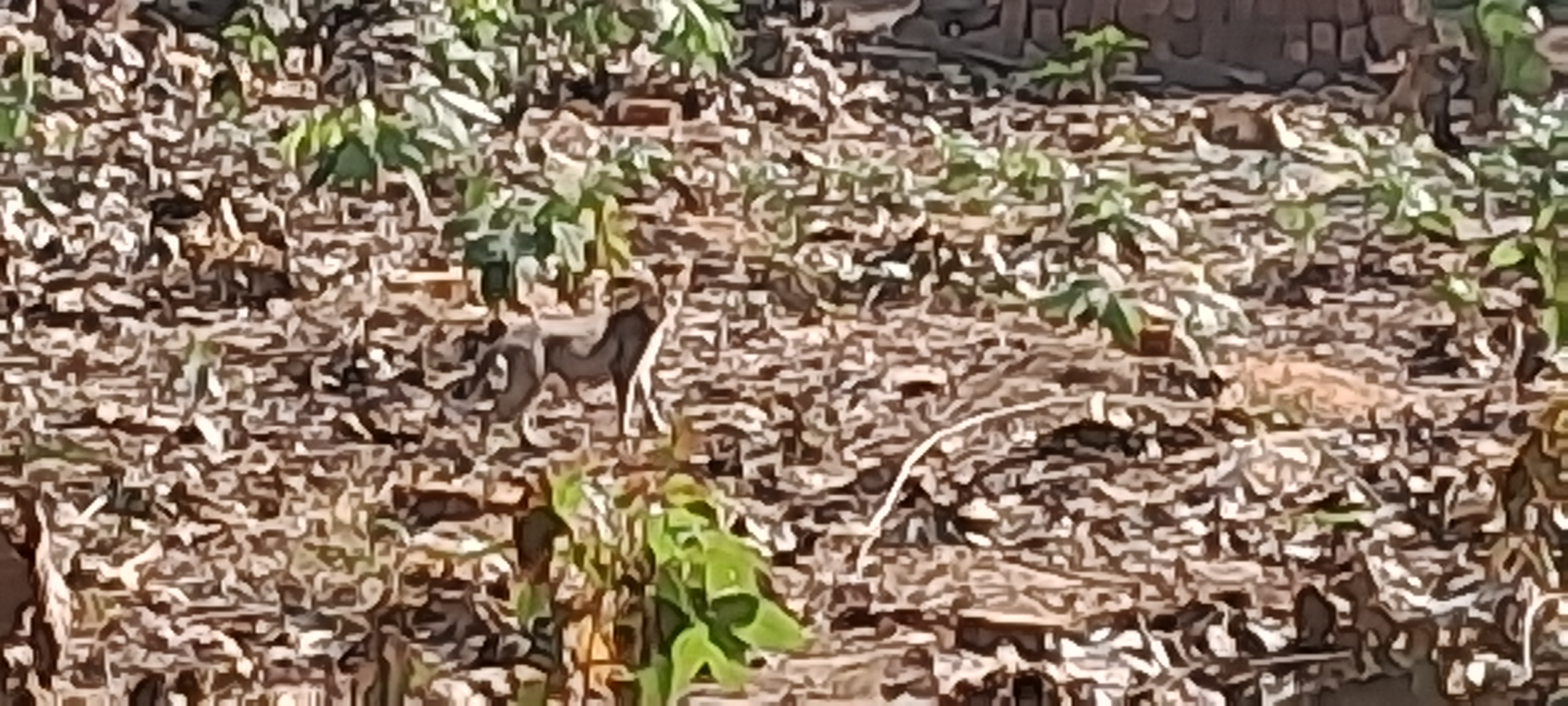
Jungle Cat

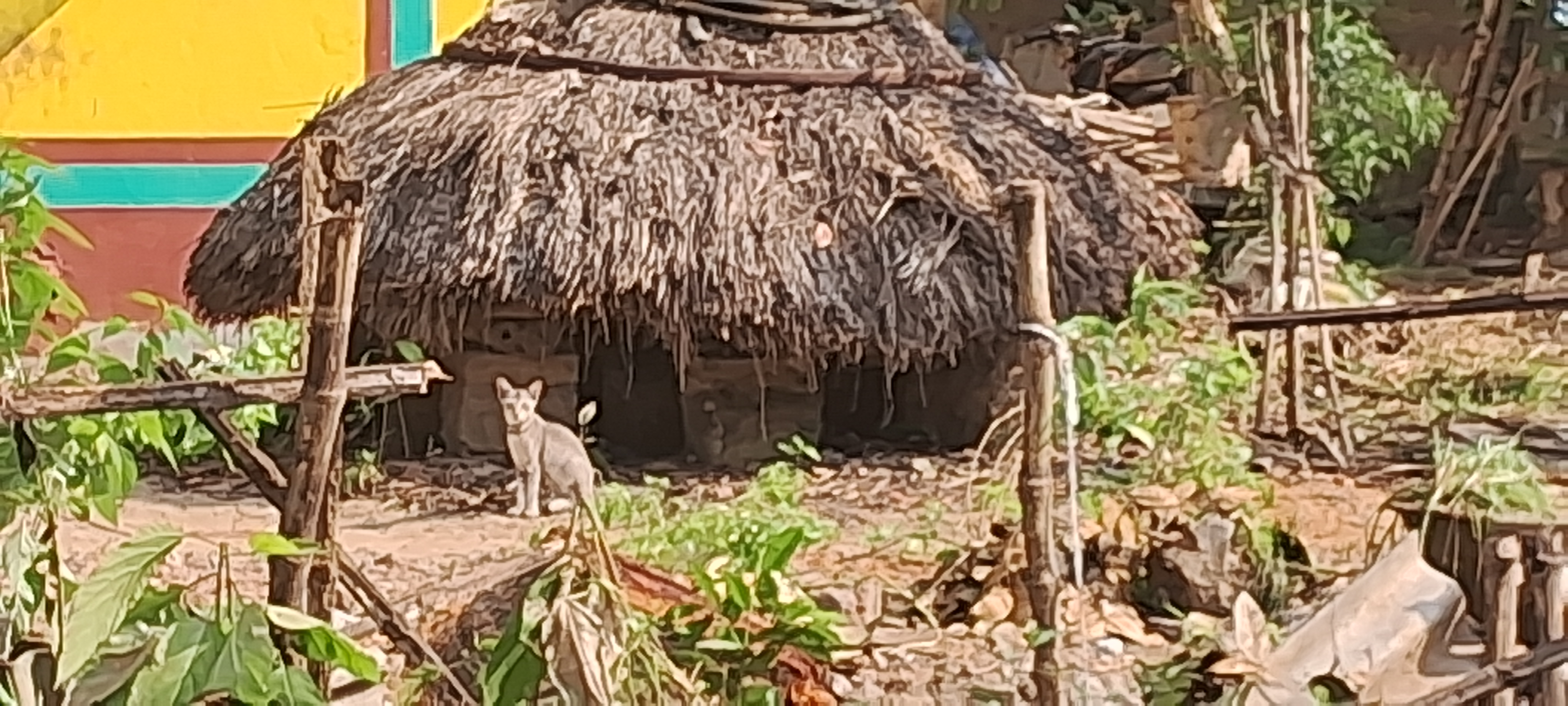
Jungle Cat

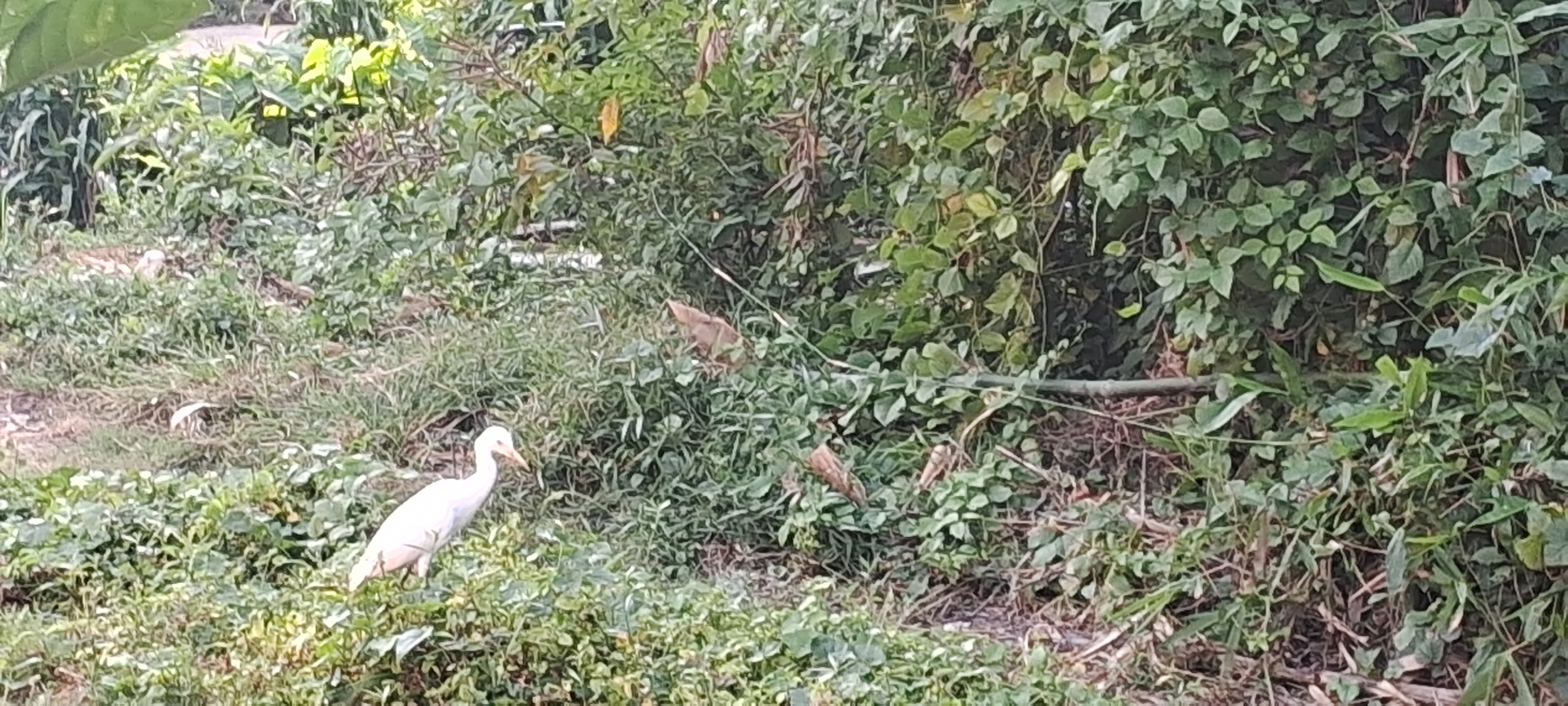
Cattle Egret

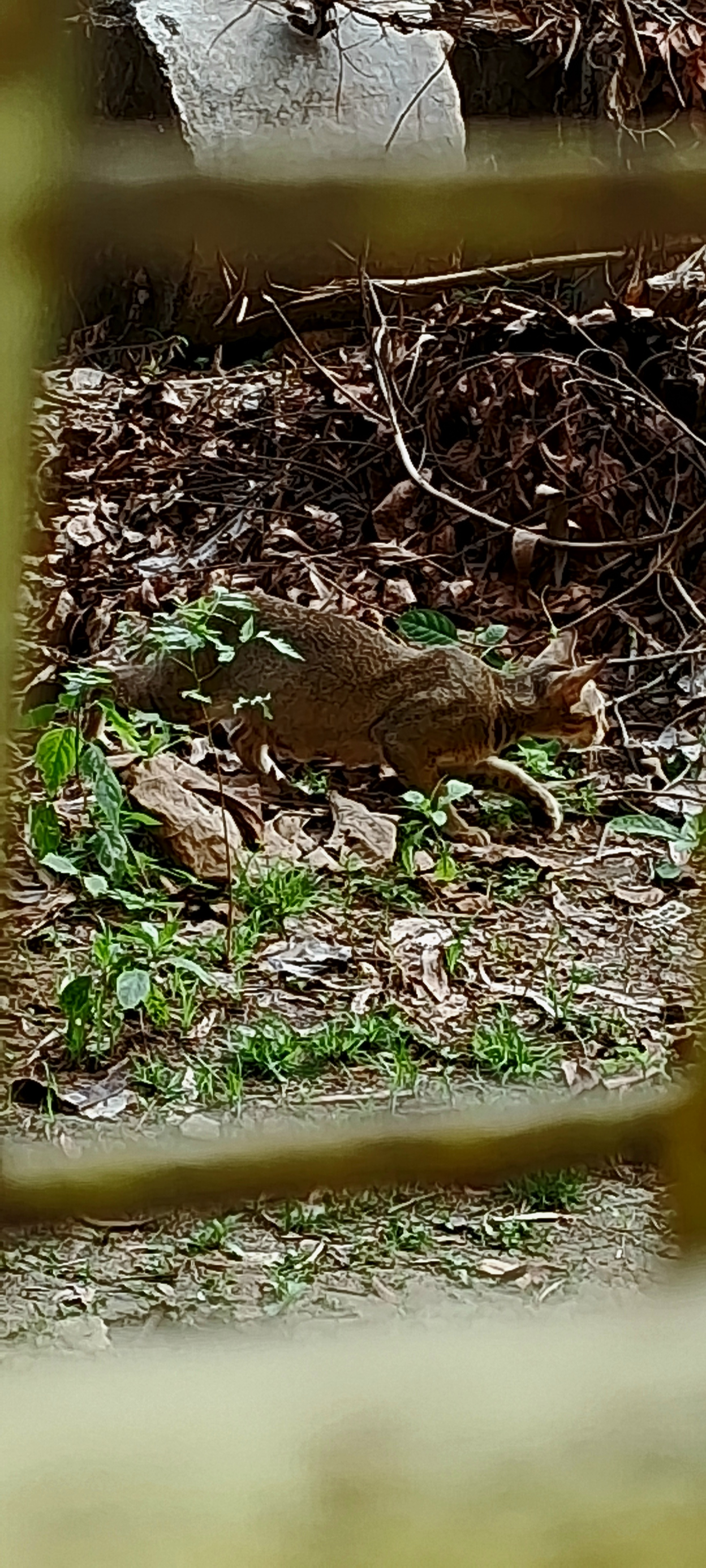
Jungle cat

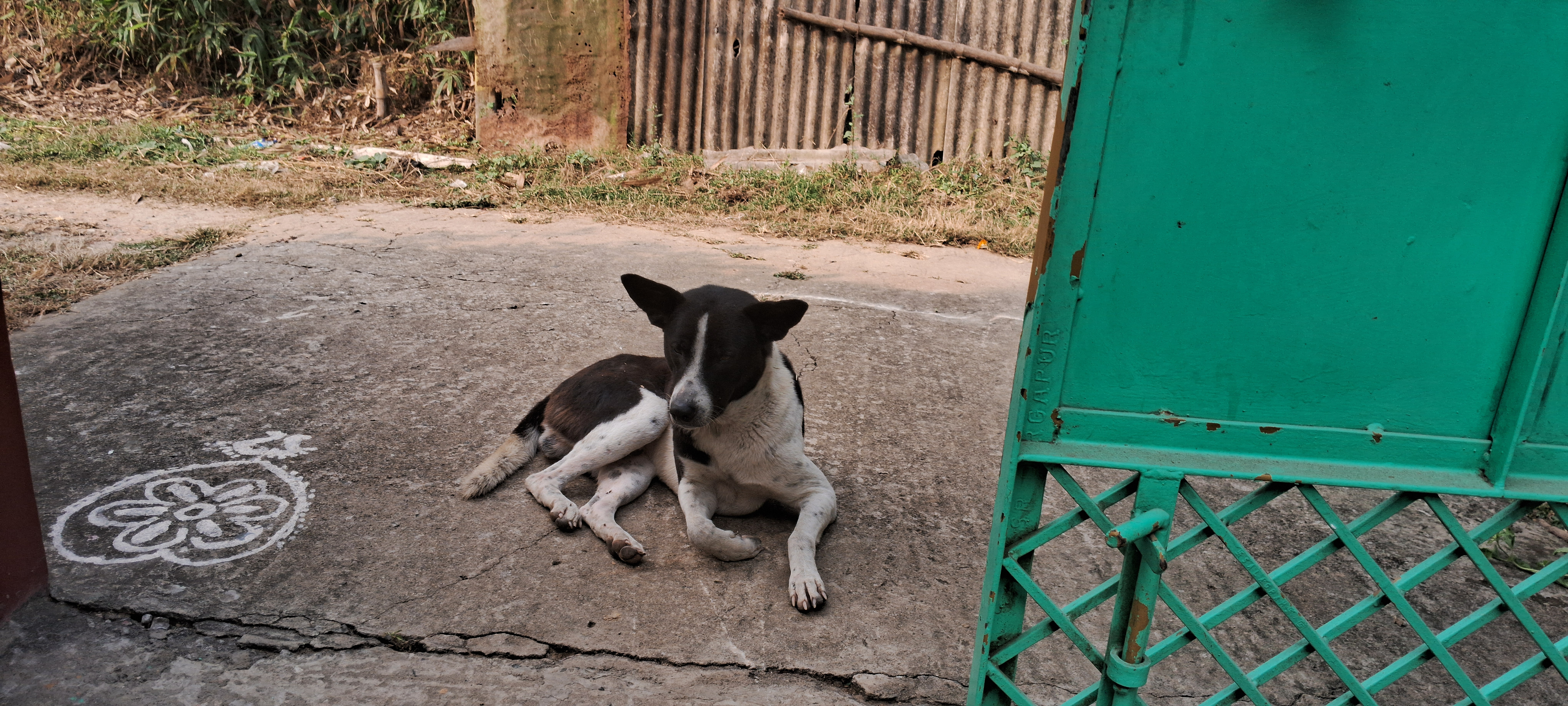
Indian Pariah Dog

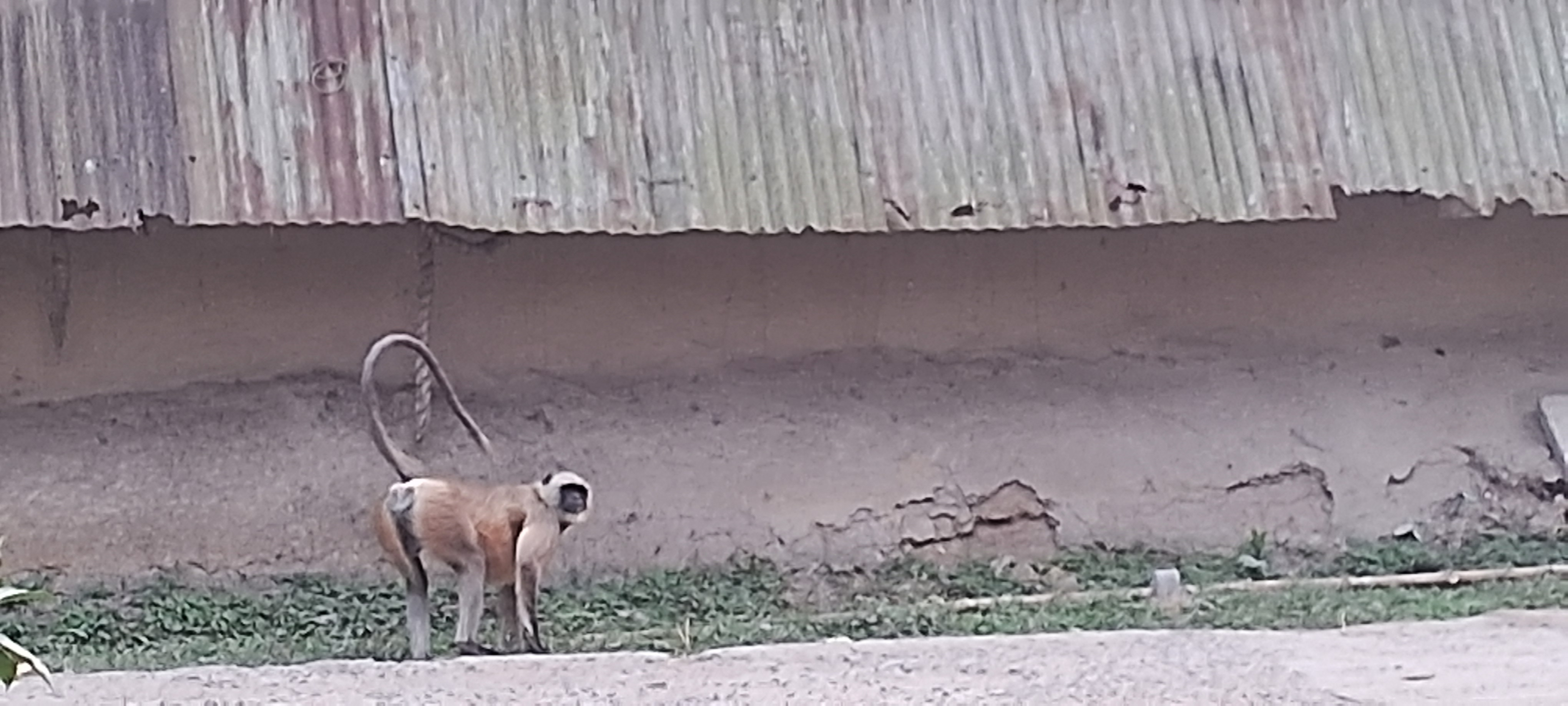
Gray Langur

Animals such as Indian pariah dog, Water Buffalo,Jungle cat,Black Bengal goat,Murrah buffalo, Indian cow,Bengal fox,Indian palm squirrel,Gray Langur are found here.

Birds such as Common kingfisher,White-throated kingfisher,Rock dove,House crow,House sparrow, Yellow-throated sparrow,Red-vented bulbul,Indian pond heron,Cattle egret,White breasted Waterhen are found here.

== Gallery ==
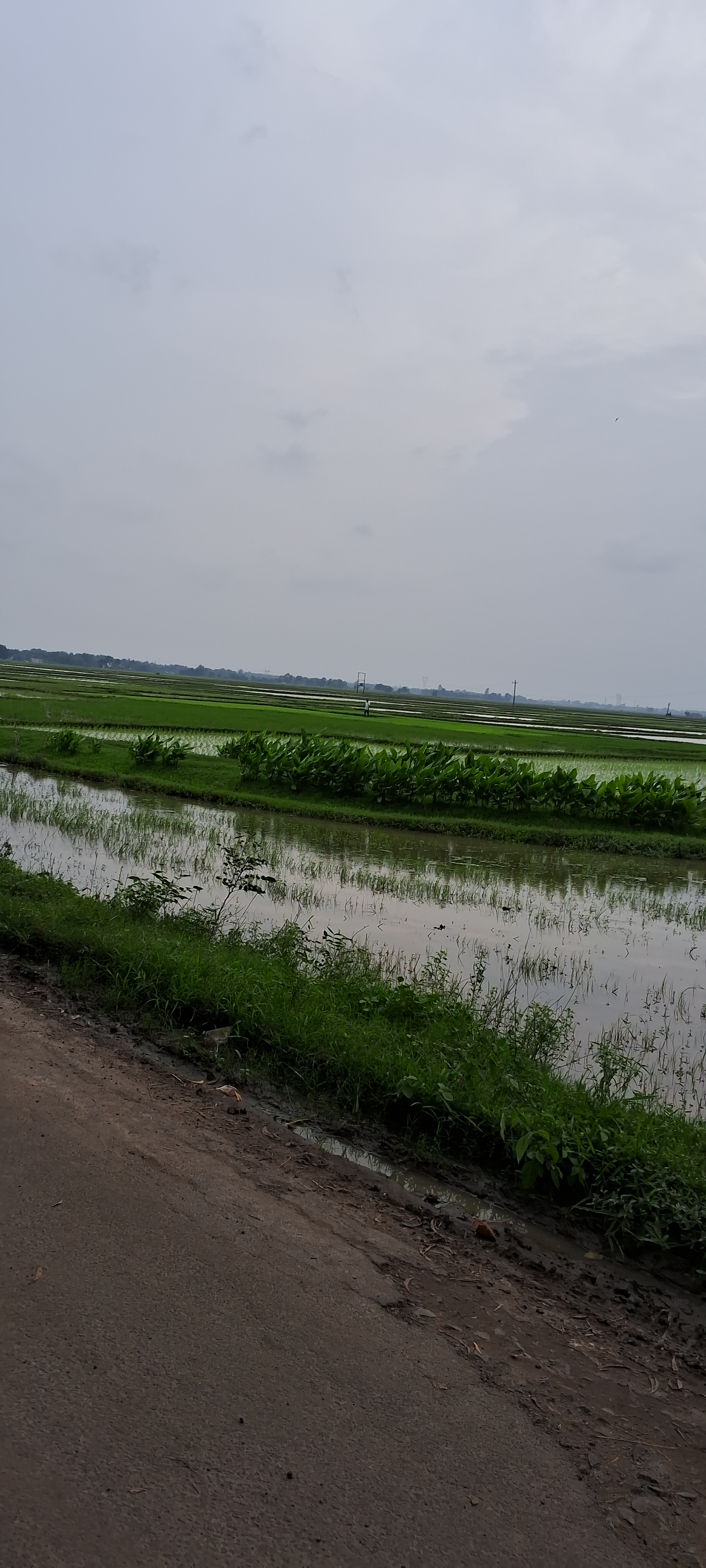
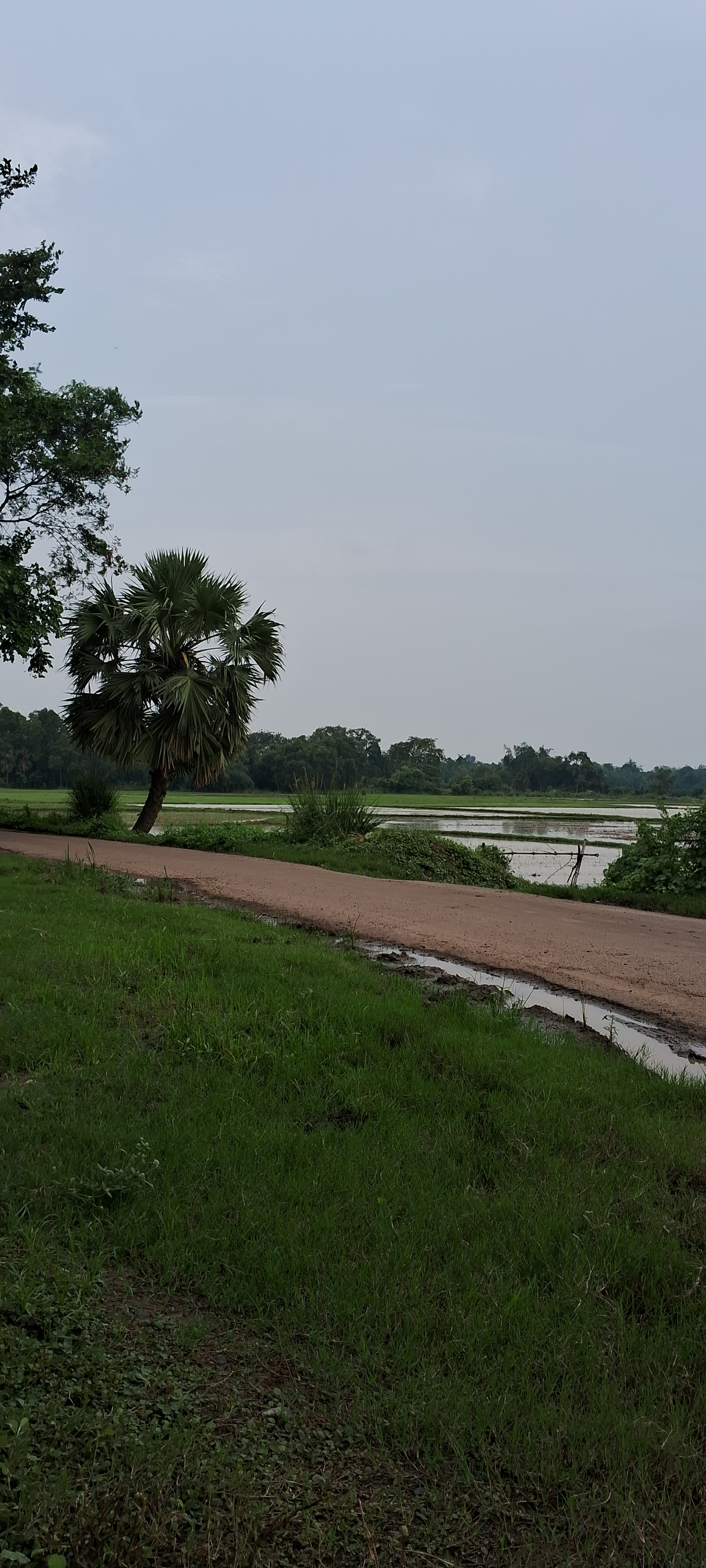
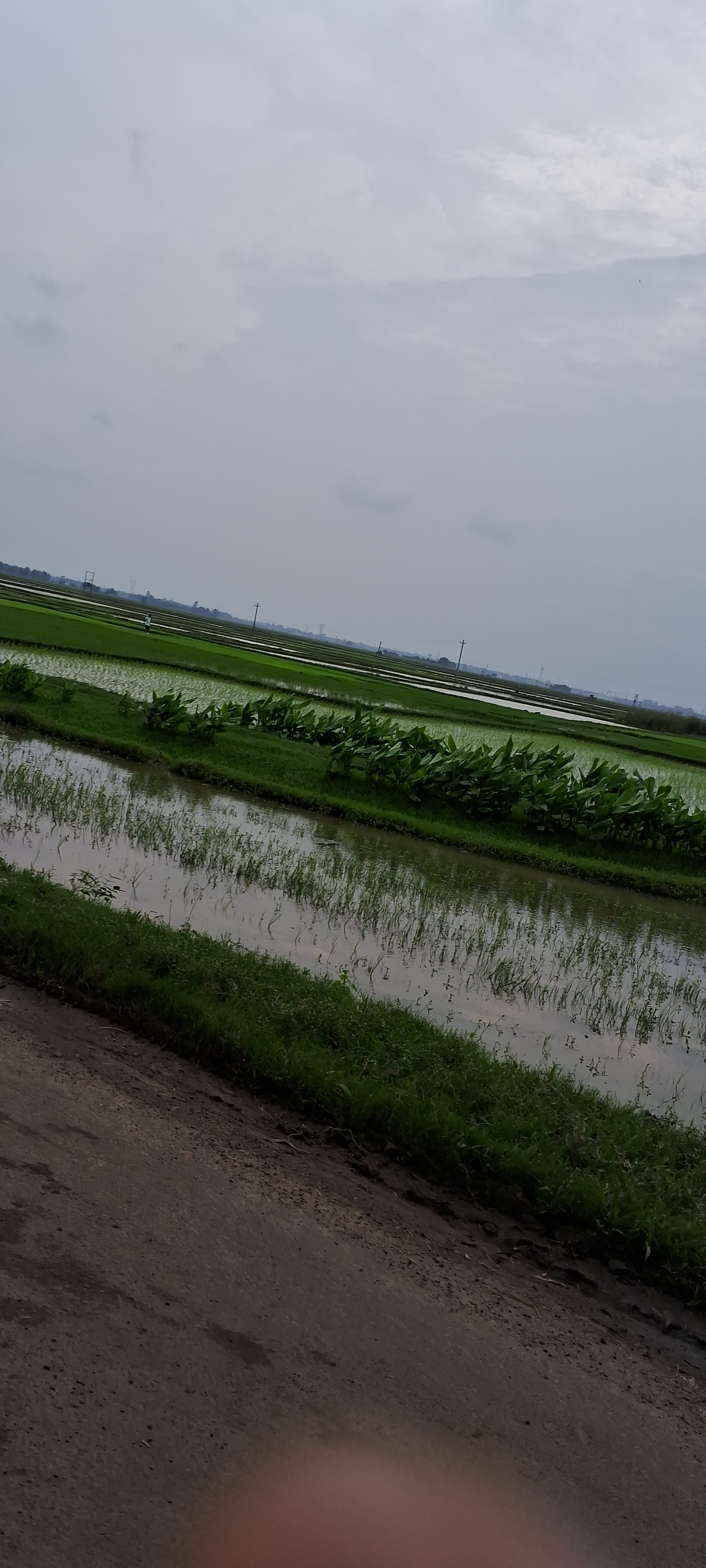
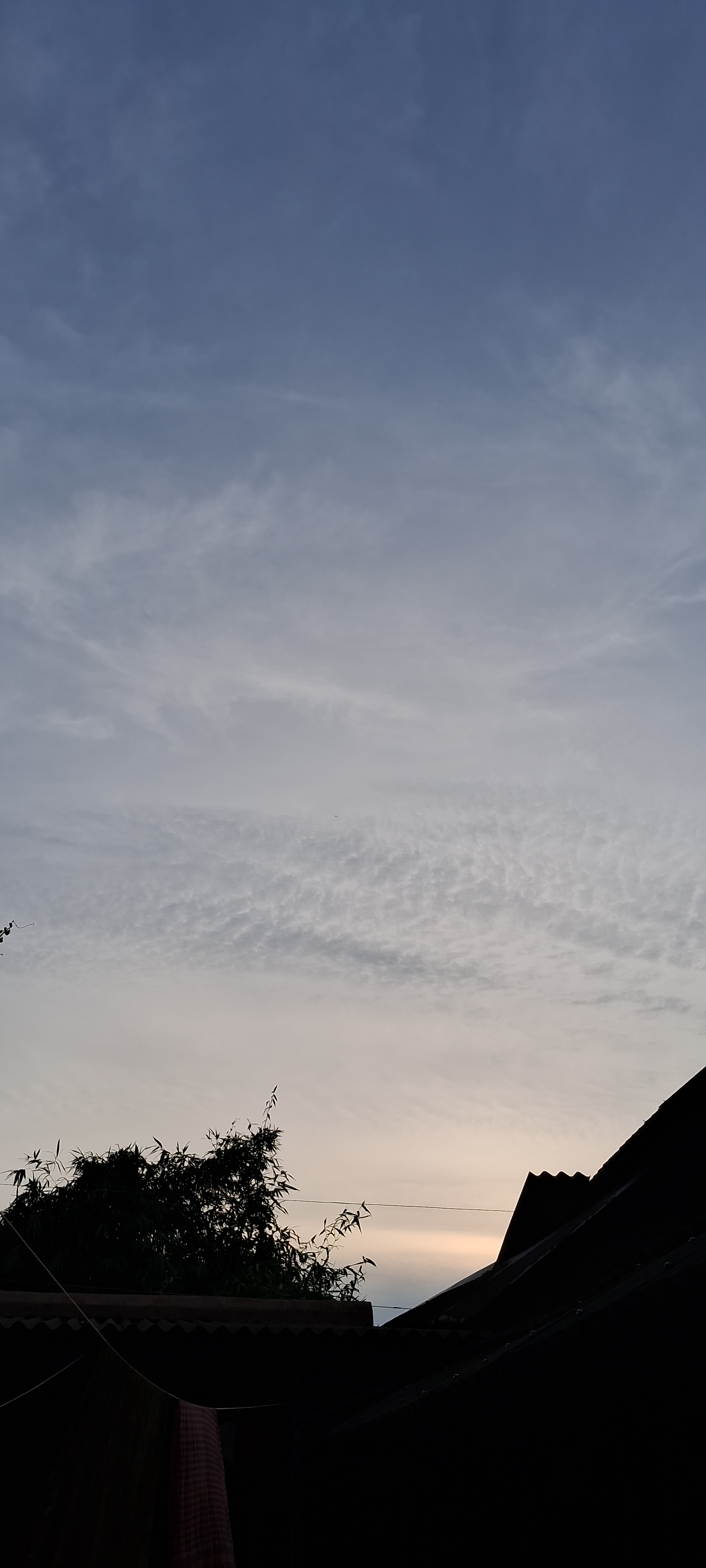
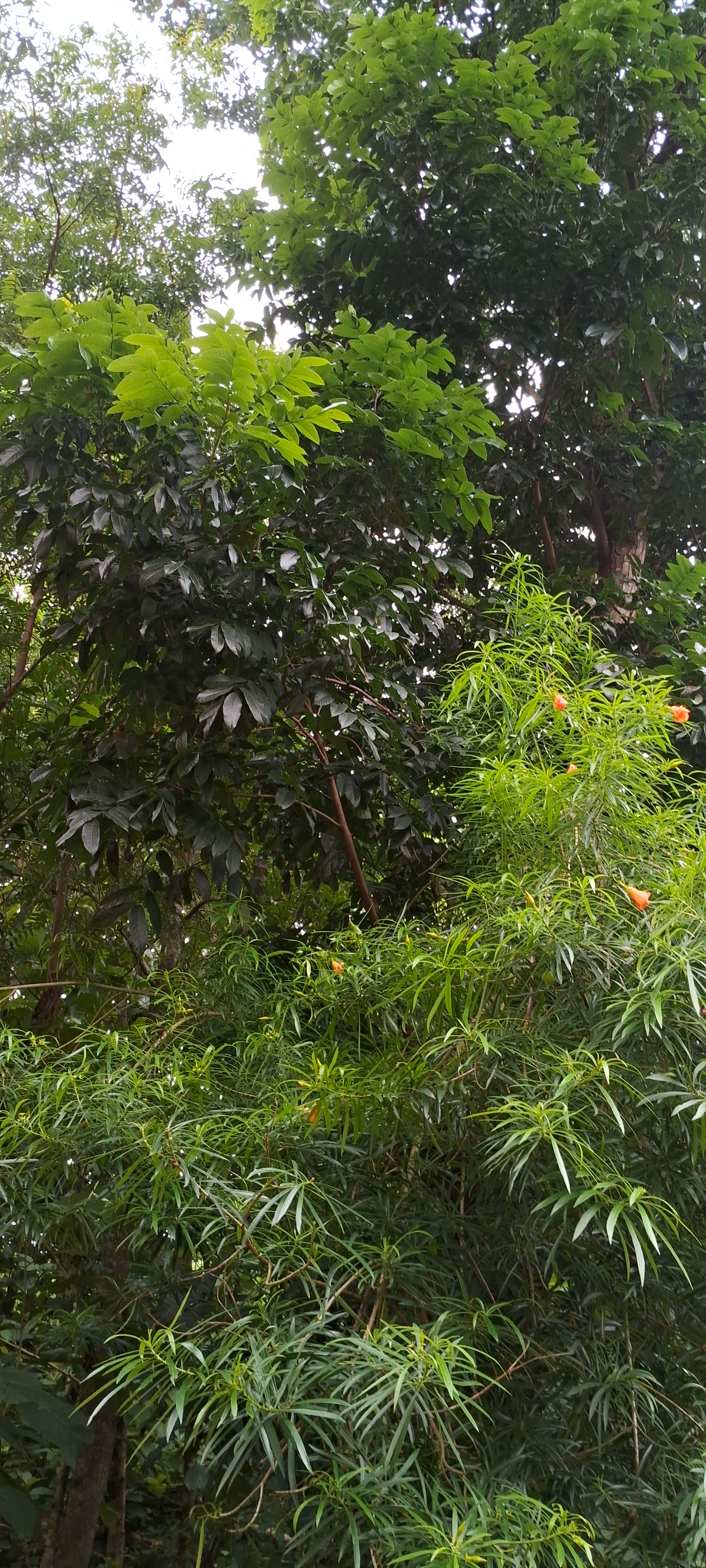
