= Goutam Buddha Das (academic administrator) =

Vice-Chancellor of Chittagong Veterinary and Animal Sciences University

Gautam Buddha Das
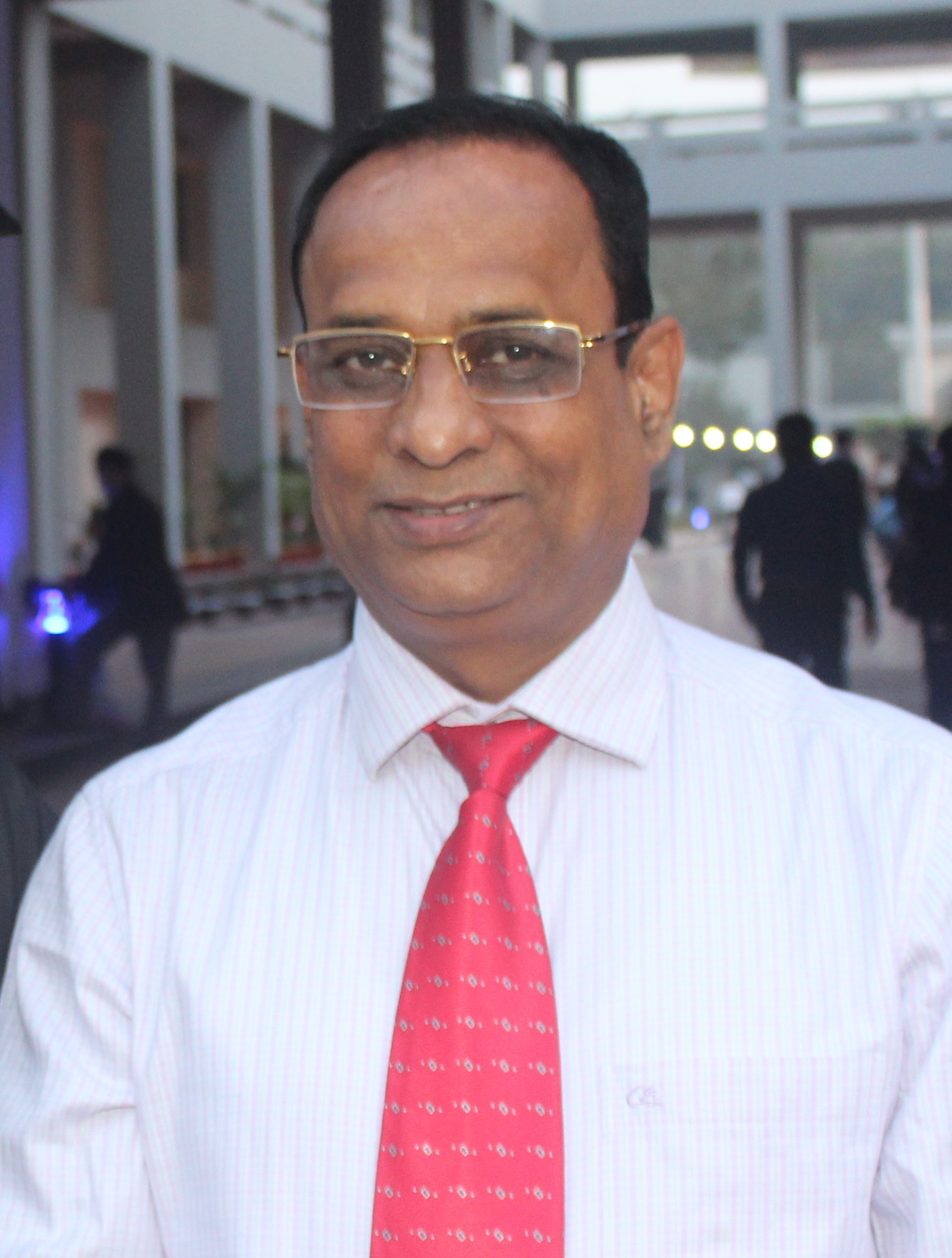
- Gautam Buddha Das

Vice-Chancellor of Chittagong Veterinary and Animal Sciences University
- In office 9 December 2014 – 2 January 2023
- Preceded by: Abusaleh Mahfuzul Bari
- Succeeded by: ASM Lutful Ahasan

Personal details
- Born: 1 July 1963 (age 63) Chandpur City, Chittagong, Bangladesh
- Education: Bangladesh Agricultural University (BSc)(MSc)(Phd); Institute of Personal Management (Post Graduate)
- Profession: Professor

Gautam Buddha Das is the former vice chancellor of Chittagong Veterinary and Animal Sciences University (CVASU). President Abdul Hamid appointed him for a second term of fours years which started on 8 December 2018.

== Biography ==
Das was born in Chandpur district, Bangladesh. His mother's name is Sabitri Rani Das. And his father's name is Swadesh Ranjan Das.

Das attended Chandpur Government College. He received an honors degree on animal husbandry from Bangladesh Agricultural University in 1985. In 1986, he received M.Sc. degree on poultry nutrition. And he did his PhD in 2012 from the same university.

On 22 January 2022, Das was awarded the Ekushey Padak, the second most important award for civilians in Bangladesh.
