= ASM Lutful Ahasan =

Bangladeshi academic

ASM Lutful Ahasan is a Bangladeshi academic and former vice-chancellor of Chittagong Veterinary and Animal Sciences University.

== Early life ==
Ahasan completed his Doctor of Veterinary Medicine in 2000 at the Chittagong Veterinary and Animal Sciences University. He did his Molecular Biology master's as part of the Interuniversity Programme Molecular Biology organized by the Ghent University, KU Leuven, University of Antwerp, and Vrije Universiteit Amsterdam. He received the VLIR-UOS Scholarship and NFP Scholarship. He received his PhD in animal nutrition and food safety from the University of Milan.

== Career ==
Ahasan joined Chittagong Veterinary and Animal Sciences University's Department of Anatomy and Histology in 2003 as a lecturer. From 2008 to 2012, he was an assistant professor. He was promoted to associate professor in 2012.

In February 2019, Ahsan was appointed head of the Department of Anatomy and Histology. In January 2023, he was appointed vice-chancellor of Chittagong Veterinary and Animal Sciences University. He replaced Professor Goutam Buddha Das.
