= Arambagh PC Sen railway station =

Railway station in West Bengal, India

Arambagh Prafulla Chandra Sen railway station
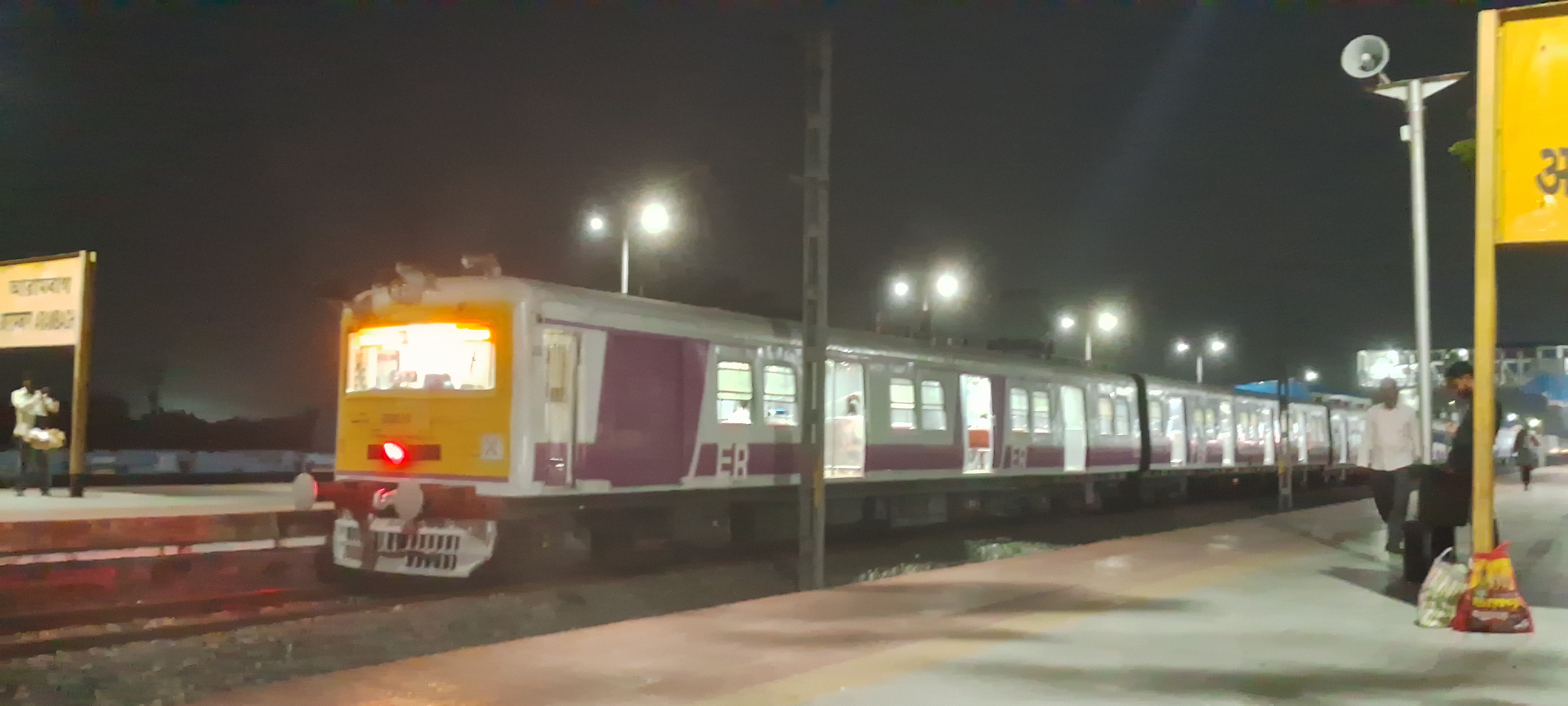
- Arambagh-Tarkeshwar EMU at Platform No.2

General information
- Other names: Arambagh railway station
- Location: Bulundi Road, Arambagh, West Bengal; India
- Coordinates: 22.88°N 87.78°E
- Elevation: 10 metres (33 ft)
- System: Indian Railway Kolkata Suburban Railway
- Owner: Indian Railways
- Operator: Eastern Railways
- Line: Howrah-Seoraphuli-Bishnupur branch line Arambagh Bowaichandi Line (Proposed)
- Distance: 200 metres
- Platforms: 3
- Tracks: 3
- Bus stands: 1

Construction
- Structure type: Elevated
- Parking: Available
- Accessible: Yes

Other information
- Status: Operational
- Station code: AMBG
- Zone(s): Eastern Railway

History
- Opened: 2011-2012
- Electrified: 2011-2012
- Former names: Tarakeswar-Bishnupur line

Services
| Preceding station | Kolkata Suburban Railway | Following station |
|---|---|---|
| Mayapur towards Howrah Junction | Eastern Line Sheoraphuli–Bishnupur branch line | Goghat Terminus |
Route map
Location
- Location within West Bengal Location within India

Arambagh Prafulla Chandra Sen Railway Station is a railway station of the Howrah–Seoraphuli–Bishnupur line under Howrah railway division of the Eastern Railways. It is situated beside Darbeshpur-Tirol-Arambagh Road at Arambagh in Hooghly district of West Bengal.

== History ==
In 1887, Howrah–Seoraphuli–Bishnupur branch line was planned to be constructed, and it was to be a track connecting Tarakeswar with Bishnupur. It was 90% completed before the 1900s, but a big pond was there in the track, and the villagers did not give the land to Indian Railways. The station was opened in November 2011. The Talpur-Arambagh sector was started on 4 June 2012. In August 2025, it was 70% finished and expected the first Howrah to Bishnupur train of this line will run in April 2026.

== Future ==
In the future, the station will be enlarged to 4 or 5 platforms because of the construction of the Howrah–Seoraphuli–Bishnupur branch line. A line from Arambagh to Bowaichandi is planned to be built. There is also plan to extend the line upto Irpala in Pashim Medinipur towards Pashkura Junction which makes a direct connection of North - South of the state. There is also proposal to make 5th line from Khanakul which announced in 2025 for survey from Railway Ministry. This will be a important station of the state after making all this lines. This line will make short distance from western districts like Purulia and Bankura from Howrah.
