= Black Bengal goat =

Breed of goat

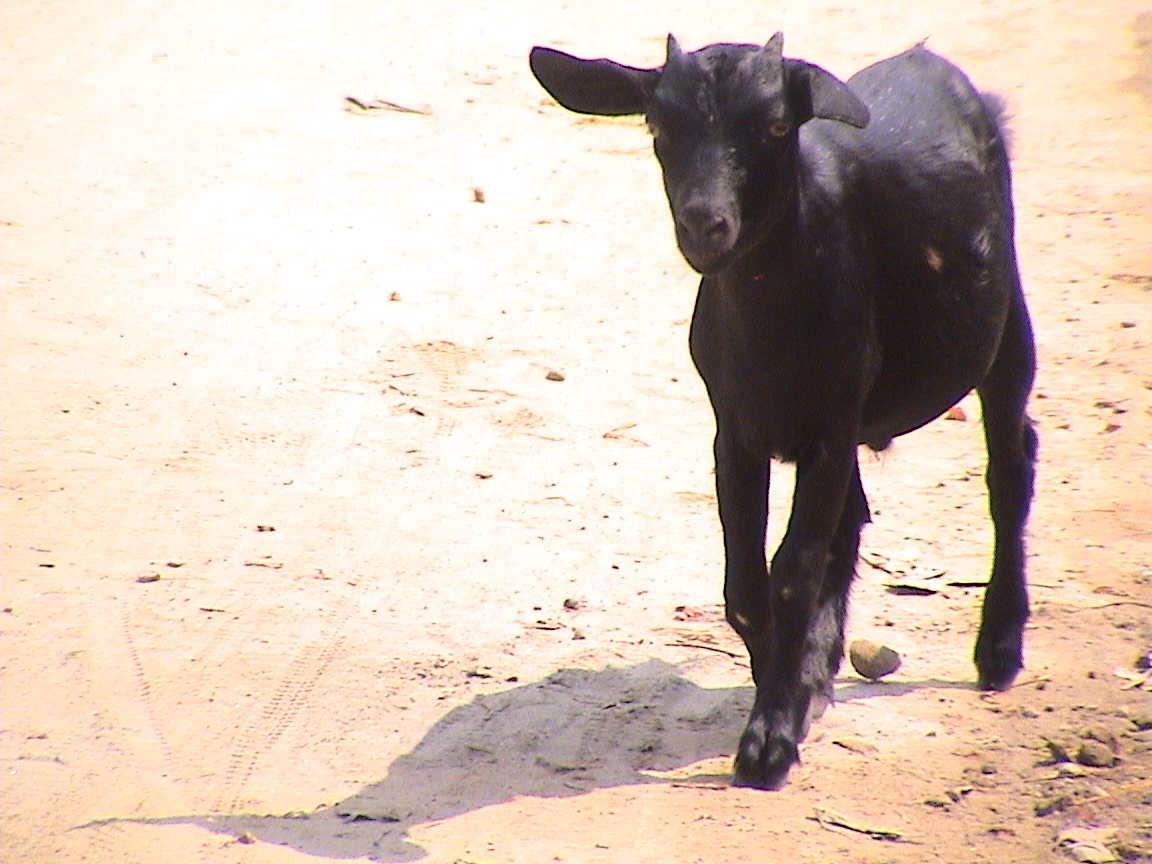
Black Bengal goat

The Black Bengal is a type of goat found in various regions including Bangladesh, West Bengal, Assam, and Odisha. These goats typically have black skin and fur, although they can also be brown, white, or gray. The Black Bengal goat is small in size but its body structure is tight. Its horns are small and legs are short. An adult male goat weights about 25 to 30 kg and female 20 to 25 kg. It is poor in milk production. It is very popular in Bangladesh because of its low demand for feed and high kid production rate. The Black Bengal goats gain sexual maturity at earlier age than most other breeds. The female goat becomes pregnant twice a year and gives birth to one to three kids. This breed can adapt to any environment easily and its disease resistance is very high.

It produces high-quality meat and skin, and is preferred for the skin and high proliferation rate.

This breed plays a very important role in reducing unemployment and poverty from Bangladesh. They can eat most vegetables, grasses and leaves, but a high amount of carrots is fatal to them.

== Genome ==
The Black Bengal goat's genome was fully sequenced by the "Genomics Research Group" led by Dr. Amam Zonaed Siddiki, Professor of Department of Pathology and Parasitology, Faculty of Veterinary Medicine of Chittagong Veterinary and Animal Sciences University (CVASU). The genome analysis of Black Bengal Goat has shown that its genome size is about 3.04 gb of which around 31.85% are repeats. Though it is predicted that there are 26,458 genes in 29 chromosomes; the gene structure annotation of only 12,589 genes are done. In addition to that, at least one ontology term was found among 8173 genes.
