= University of Global Village =

Private university in Barisal division of Bangladesh

University of Global Village (UGV)
- Motto: Knowledge is Light
- Type: Private
- Established: 2016; 10 years ago
- Chancellor: President Mirza Fakhrul Islam Alamgir
- Vice-Chancellor: Abdul Baqee
- Location: Barisal, Bangladesh; 22.7072°N 90.3523°E
- Website: ugv.edu.bd

University of Global Village (UGV) (Bengali: ইউনিভার্সিটি অব গ্লোবাল ভিলেজ) is a private university in Barisal, Bangladesh. The main campus is at 874/322 C&B Road, Barisal Sadar, Barisal. The University Grants Commission approved the institution in 2016. The university offers degrees in engineering, agriculture, arts, business and science.

Md. Imran Chowdhury is the current chairman of the University of Global Village Trust according to PUA-2010. The Board of Trustees (BOT) is headed by the chairman. The Syndicate, the highest executive body headed by the vice chancellor runs the university administration.

The chancellor of the university, President Mohammed Shahabuddin Chuppu, appointed Abdul Baqee as the new vice chancellor for four years
