= Krishibid Institution Bangladesh =

Research institute in Bangladesh

- বাংলাদেশ কৃষিবিদ ইনস্টিটিউশন
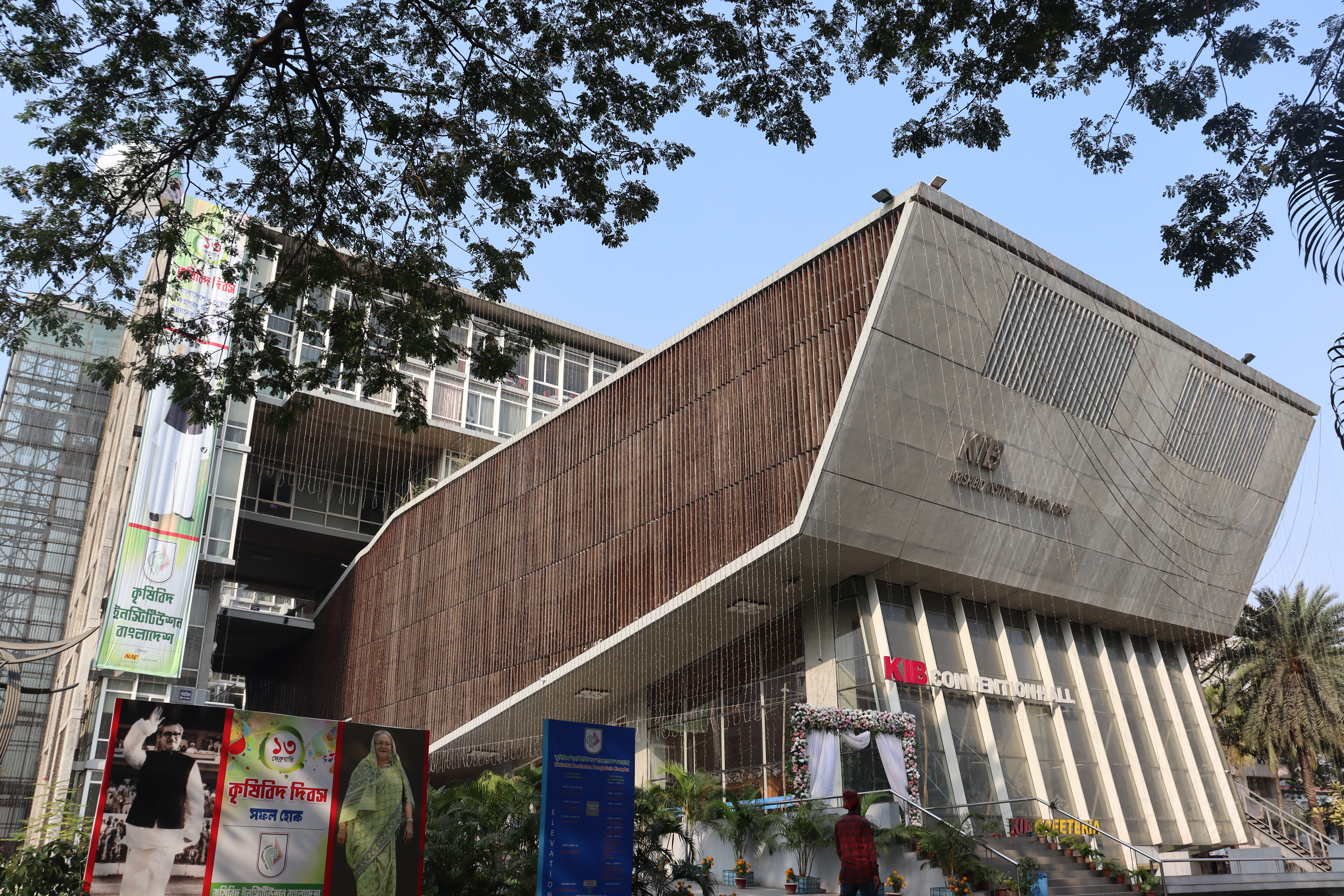
- Krishibid Institution Bangladesh Bhaban
- Formation: 1972; 54 years ago
- Headquarters: Dhaka, Bangladesh
- Region served: Bangladesh
- Official language: Bengali
- Website: www.kib.org.bd
- Formerly called: Bangladesh Agriculturalist Association (till 1981); East Pakistan Agriculturalist Association (till 1971)

Krishibid Institution Bangladesh (Bengali: বাংলাদেশ কৃষিবিদ ইনস্টিটিউশন, lit. 'Bangladesh Agricultural Institution'), is a professional body of professional agriculturalists in Bangladesh.

== History ==
Krishibid Institution Bangladesh traces its origin to the East Pakistan Agriculturalist Association, its predecessor, which was formed in 1970 in Rajshahi University. After the Independence of Bangladesh, the East Pakistan Agriculturalist Association was renamed to Bangladesh Agriculturalist Association. In 1981, it was renamed to Krishibid Institution Bangladesh. The Krishibid Institution, Bangladesh Auditorium is located in Farmgate, Dhaka.
