= Bangladesh Livestock Research Institute =

Research institute in Bangladesh

- Formation: 1984
- Headquarters: Savar Upazila, Bangladesh
- Region served: Bangladesh
- Official language: Bengali
- Website: www.blri.gov.bd

The Bangladesh Livestock Research Institute or BLRI is an autonomous government research institution for livestock and related research.

== History ==
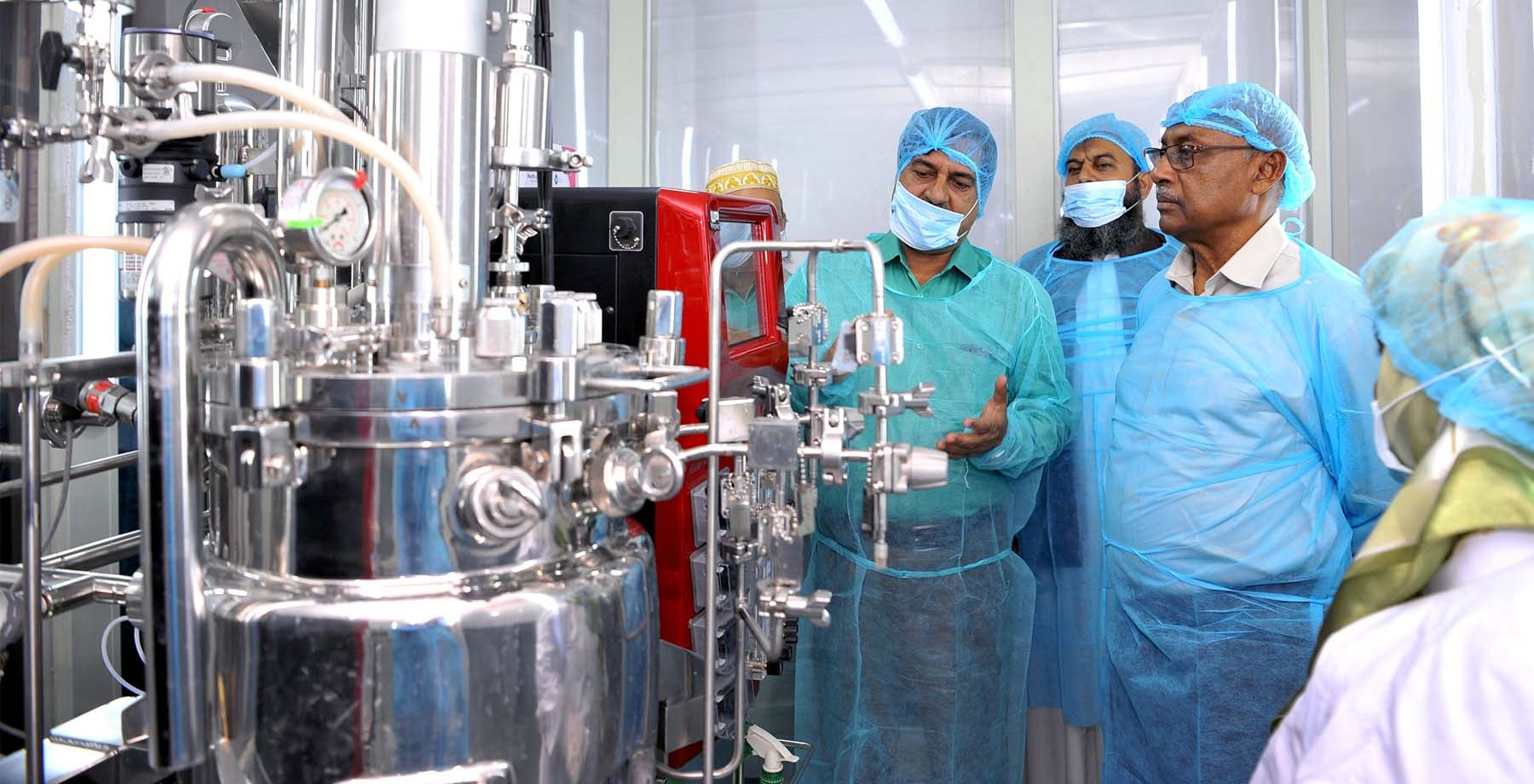
Vaccine production facility of BLRI

The institute was founded in 1984 in Savar Upazila, Dhaka Division, Bangladesh. The executive head is the director general and a 14-member board of management. The chairman is the Minister for Fisheries and Livestock. In 2014, it developed a new species of layer chicken whose sex was discernable at day one of their life. It developed cattle feed from moringa tree and vegetable waste.
