= Md. Giashuddin Miah =

Academic

Md. Giashuddin Miah is a Bangladeshi academic and vice-chancellor of Bangabandhu Sheikh Mujibur Rahman Agricultural University.

== Early life ==
Miah was born in 1960. He did his bachelor's degree and masters in Agronomy at the Bangladesh Agricultural University in 1982 and 1984 respectively. He completed his PhD in 1993 at the Central Luzon State University. From 1995 to 1996, he did his post-graduate diploma at Kyushu University. He did some post graduate research at Université Laval and the University of Nottingham.

== Career ==
Miah joined the Bangladesh Tea Research Institute in 1984. He joined Bangladesh Agricultural Research Institute the next year as a senior researcher. He joined the Institute of Postgraduate Studies in Agriculture (renamed and upgraded to Bangabandhu Sheikh Mujibur Rahman Agricultural University in 1998) in 1993 as an assistant professor.

Miah is a former president of Ganotantrik Shikkhok Parishad, the pro-Awami League teachers' forum. Miah is the co-chairman of the Asia-Pacific Network for Global Change Research.

On 11 June 2017, Miah was appointed the Vice-Chancellor of the Bangabandhu Sheikh Mujibur Rahman Agricultural University. He complained to the Ministry of Education about Shahidur Rahman Khan, Vice-Chancellor of the Khulna Agricultural University, along with four other members regarding Khan recruiting his family members at the university. Miah is a member of the syndicate body of Khulna Agricultural University. On 24 May 2021, he was re-appointed the Vice-Chancellor of the Bangabandhu Sheikh Mujibur Rahman Agricultural University before his term ended on 10 June. He hosted Ichiguchi Tomohide, Bangladesh head of Japan International Cooperation Agency and thanked Japan International Cooperation Agency for providing aid and support to the university.
