= Kamaluddin Ahmed =

Kamaluddin Ahmed or Kamal Uddin Ahmed may refer to:

- Kamaluddin Ahmed (politician) (1930–2018), Indian politician
- Kamaluddin Ahmed (physicist) (1939–2014), Pakistani particle physicist
- Kamal Dasgupta (1912–1974), commonly known as Kamal Uddin Ahmed, Bangladeshi music director, composer and folk artist
- Kamal Uddin Ahmed (government official) (born 1959), Bangladeshi government official
- Kamaluddin Ahmad, Bangladeshi academic
