= Sher-e-Bangla Agricultural University =

Agricultural university in Dhaka, Bangladesh

- শেরেবাংলা কৃষি বিশ্ববিদ্যালয়
- Logo of Sher-e-Bangla Agricultural University
- Former names: Bengal Agricultural Institute, East Pakistan Agricultural Institute, Bangladesh Agricultural Institute
- Motto: Bengali: গবেষণা, শিক্ষা, সম্প্রসারণ
- Motto in English: Research, Education, Extension
- Type: Public Agricultural University
- Established: 1938 (Institute), 2001 (University)
- Affiliations: UGC - University Grants Commission (Bangladesh), Krishibid Institution Bangladesh
- Chancellor: President Mirza Fakhrul Islam Alamgir
- Vice-Chancellor: Md Abdul Latif
- Academic staff: 361
- Administrative staff: 619
- Students: ~5358
- Location: Sher-e-Bangla Nagar, Dhaka, Bangladesh; 23.7714°N 90.3754°E
- Campus: Urban, 86.97 acres (35.20 ha)
- Website: sau.edu.bd

University rankings

Regional – Overall
- QS Asia: 801-850 (2026)

Sher-e-Bangla Agricultural University (SAU; Bengali: শেরেবাংলা কৃষি বিশ্ববিদ্যালয়) is one of the oldest agriculture educational institutions in South Asia, situated in Sher-e-Bangla Nagar, Dhaka, Bangladesh. It was established on 11 December 1938 as Bengal Agricultural Institute (BAI) by Sher-e-Bangla A. K. Fazlul Huq, then the Chief Minister of undivided Bengal and later upgraded to a university in 2001 and renamed as Sher-e-Bangla Agricultural University.

Since its establishment, the university plays a role in agricultural research and development (R&D) of the region through the creation of knowledge, agricultural technology generation and transfer, crop diversification and intensification for the benefit of farming communities. SAU offers undergraduate, post graduate, and Ph.D. degrees through course credit system.

== History ==
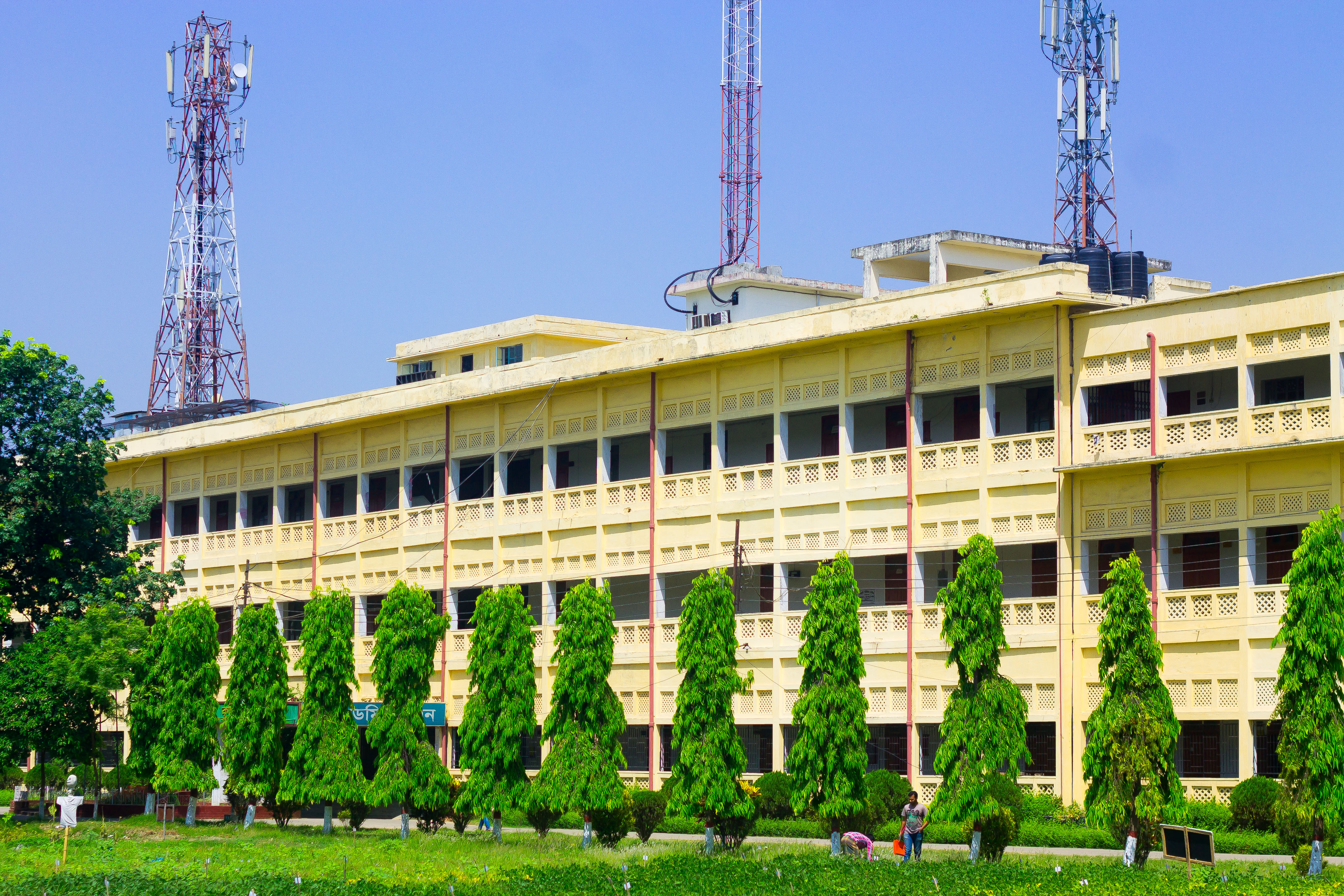
Sher-e-Bangla Agricultural University, Dhaka, Bangladesh

SAU was established as Bengal Agricultural Institute (BAI) on 11 December 1938 by Sher-e-Bangla A. K. Fazlul Huq, the chief minister of undivided Bengal. The Bengal Agricultural Institute was renamed East Pakistan Agricultural Institute (EPAI)in 1947. After the emergence of Bangladesh as an independent country in 1971, the name of the institute was spontaneously changed to Bangladesh Agricultural Institute (BAI).

Since its inception in 1938, the BAI has been functioning as a Faculty of Agriculture under Dhaka University. After the establishment of Bangladesh Agricultural University (BAU) at Mymensingh in 1961, its academic function was transferred to BAU in 1964, until its upgrade to Sher-e-Bangla Agricultural University in 2001.

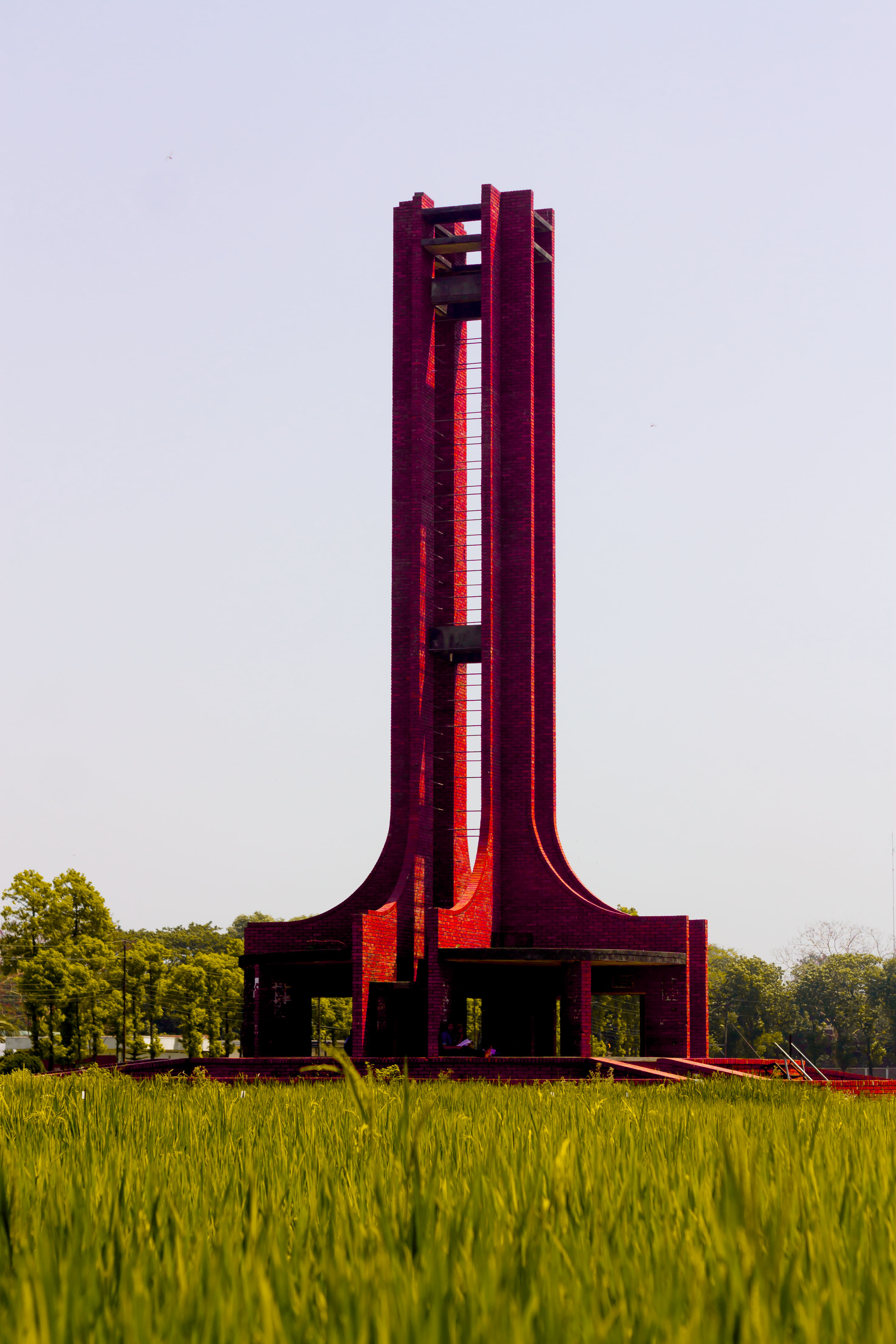
Sher-e-Bangla Agricultural University, Dhaka, Bangladesh

SAU became the 17th public university of the country in 2001. The Sher-e-Bangla Agricultural University Act 2001 was passed in the Parliament of Bangladesh on 11 September 2001.

SAU functioned as a university from 2001 with a single faculty: The Faculty of Agriculture, following the issuance of a notification by the government as per the requirement of the Sher-e-Bangla Agricultural University Act 2001. On 22 June 2009, a bill was placed in the parliament to assign the president as chancellor. The Agribusiness Management, Animal Science & Veterinary Medicine and Fisheries, Aquaculture and Marine Science faculties started in 2007, 2012 and 2017 respectively.

Nearly 5,700 graduates plus 600 postgraduates have been produced by the Sher-e-Bangla Agricultural University. Presently, about 3,300 undergraduate and postgraduate students are enrolled and are taught by faculty members.

== List of vice chancellors ==
Sequence	Name	Picture	Tenure
1	Md. Sadat Ullah		15 July 2001 – 9 September 2001
2	A. M. Faruk		5 December 2001 – 2 March 2008
3	Habib Abu Ibrahim		3 March 2008 – 16 July 2008
4	Md. Shah Alam		17 July 2008 – 16 July 2012
5	Sadat Ullah		26 July 2012 – 25 July 2017
6	Kamal Uddin Ahmmed		14 August 2016 – 13 August 2020
7	Sheikh Rezaul Karim (Acting)		
8	Md. Shahidur Rashid Bhuiyan		17 November 2020 – 7 August 2024
9	Md. Abdul Latif		5 September 2024 – Present

== Campus ==
The campus is surrounded by 87 acres of land. This campus is like a small village in the center of Dhaka city.

=== Infrastructure ===
- 1 administrative building
- 3 faculty building & complex
- 1 Library
- 1 Auditorium
- 7 halls for students
- 1 Poultry farm
- Machinery farm
- Research field (Agronomy, Horticulture, Genetics and plant breeding, plant pathology, etc.)
- 2 Mashjid (mosque)
- Temple
- Cyber café
- Gymnasium
- Medical Center
- Cafeteria

=== Library ===
Sher-e-Bangla Agricultural University Library is in a separate three-storied building at the east wing of the administrative building. It was established in 1938, likely the first special library in Bangladesh.

The library has a collection of more than 40 thousand books comprising the major subjects of agriculture and related subjects. It also collects popular national journals related to agriculture and a few international journals. Students and teachers can borrow books; they use its reference books/journals during the opening hours. The library has 24 administrative personnel. It has been providing Internet service facilities to its users. It has a large number of electronic resource collections.

Recently, the library has shown an interest in e-Resources. As a result, it subscribed to JSTOR, HINARI, AGORA, OARE, Oxford Scholarship Online, Pearsons, Taylor & Francis ebooks, CRCnetBase, Wiley Online, IMF e-Library, Emerald Insight, TEEAL, LiCob and it has an institutional repository. The university has built a Digital Archive on Agricultural Theses and Journals (DAATJ) under the funding of UGC-HEQEP.

=== Halls of residence ===
The Sher-e-Bangla Agricultural University has four halls for male and three for female students. Students either reside in or are attached to a hall of residence. A provost and an assistant provost look after the administration of a hall.

==== Boy's dormitories ====
- Sher-e-Bangla Hall
- Nabab Siraj-Ud-Doula Hall
- Kabi Kazi Nazrul Islam Hall
- Bijoy 24 Hall

==== Girl's dormitories ====
- Begum Syedunnesa Hall
- Begum Rokeya Hall
- Oporajita 24 Hall

== Academic ==
=== Faculties ===
- Faculty of Agriculture
- Faculty of Agribusiness Management
- Faculty of Animal Science and Veterinary Medicine
- Faculty of Fisheries, Aquaculture and Marine Science
- Faculty of Post Graduate Studies

=== Faculty of Agriculture ===
- Department of Agricultural Botany
- Department of Agricultural Chemistry
- Department of Agricultural Extension and Information System
- Department of Agroforestry and Environmental Science
- Department of Agronomy
- Department of Agricultural Engineering
- Department of Biochemistry & Molecular Biology
- Department of Biotechnology
- Department of Language
- Department of Entomology
- Department of Genetics and Plant Breeding
- Department of Horticulture
- Department of Plant Pathology
- Department of Soil Science

=== Faculty of Agribusiness Management ===
- Department of Agricultural Economics
- Department of Development and Poverty Studies
- Department of Agricultural Statistics
- Department of Agricultural Finance and Management
- Department of Agribusiness and Marketing

=== Faculty of Animal Science and Veterinary Medicine ===
- Department of Anatomy, Histology and Physiology
- Department of Animal Nutrition, Genetics & Breeding
- Department of Animal Production & Management
- Department of Dairy Science
- Department of Medicine and Public Health
- Department of Microbiology & Parasitology
- Department of Pathology
- Department of Pharmacology & Toxicology
- Department of Poultry Science
- Department of Surgery & Theriogenology

=== Faculty of Fisheries, Aquaculture and Marine Science ===
- Department of Fisheries Biology and Genetics
- Department of Aquaculture
- Department of Fishing and Postharvest Technology
- Department of Aquatic Animal Health Management
- Department of Aquatic Environment and Resource Management
- Department of Marine Fisheries and Oceanography

=== Faculty of Post Graduate Studies ===
- MS in Food Safety
- MS in Agricultural Journalism

=== Institutes ===
- Institute of Seed Technology

=== Admission ===
==== Undergraduate ====
From 2019 to 2020 Academic year a unified cluster system admission test is introduced in nine Universities which provide education in the field of Agricultural Sciences these are Sher-e-Bangla Agricultural University, Bangabandhu Sheikh Mujibur Rahman Agricultural University, Bangladesh Agricultural University, Chittagong Veterinary and Animal Sciences University, Sylhet Agricultural University, Khulna Agricultural University, Patuakhali Science and Technology University, Habiganj Agricultural University and Kurigram Agricultural University. After then students get chance of admission as per their choice and score of merit list

==== Undergraduate Degree ====
1.BSc Ag. (Hons.)

2.BSc in Agricultural Economics (Hons.)

3.BSc in Fisheries (Hons.)

4.BSc Vet. Sci. & A. H.

==== Post Graduate Degree ====
MS, PhD

=== Research organisation ===
- Sher-e-Bangla Agricultural University Research System (SAURES)
- Dr. Kazi M Badruddoza Research Centre

=== Research programs ===
New technologies are developed by potential researchers through the Sher-e-Bangla Agricultural University Research System (SAURES). The Genetics and Plant Breeding Department has a major research thrust on the development of new varieties of crops; identification of parental lines for hybrid development; molecular characterisation of crops and germplasm characterisation, documentation and preservation.

== Convocation ==
The first convocation of the university took place on 16 November 2015. The President of Bangladesh, Md. Abdul Hamid was the chief guest of the convocation.

== Publications ==
- SAU Barta
- Journal of Sher-e-Bangla Agricultural University

== Notable alumni ==
- Noazesh Ahmed, plant geneticist and photographer
