= Md. Asaduzzaman Sarker =

Bangladeshi agricultural scientist and academic

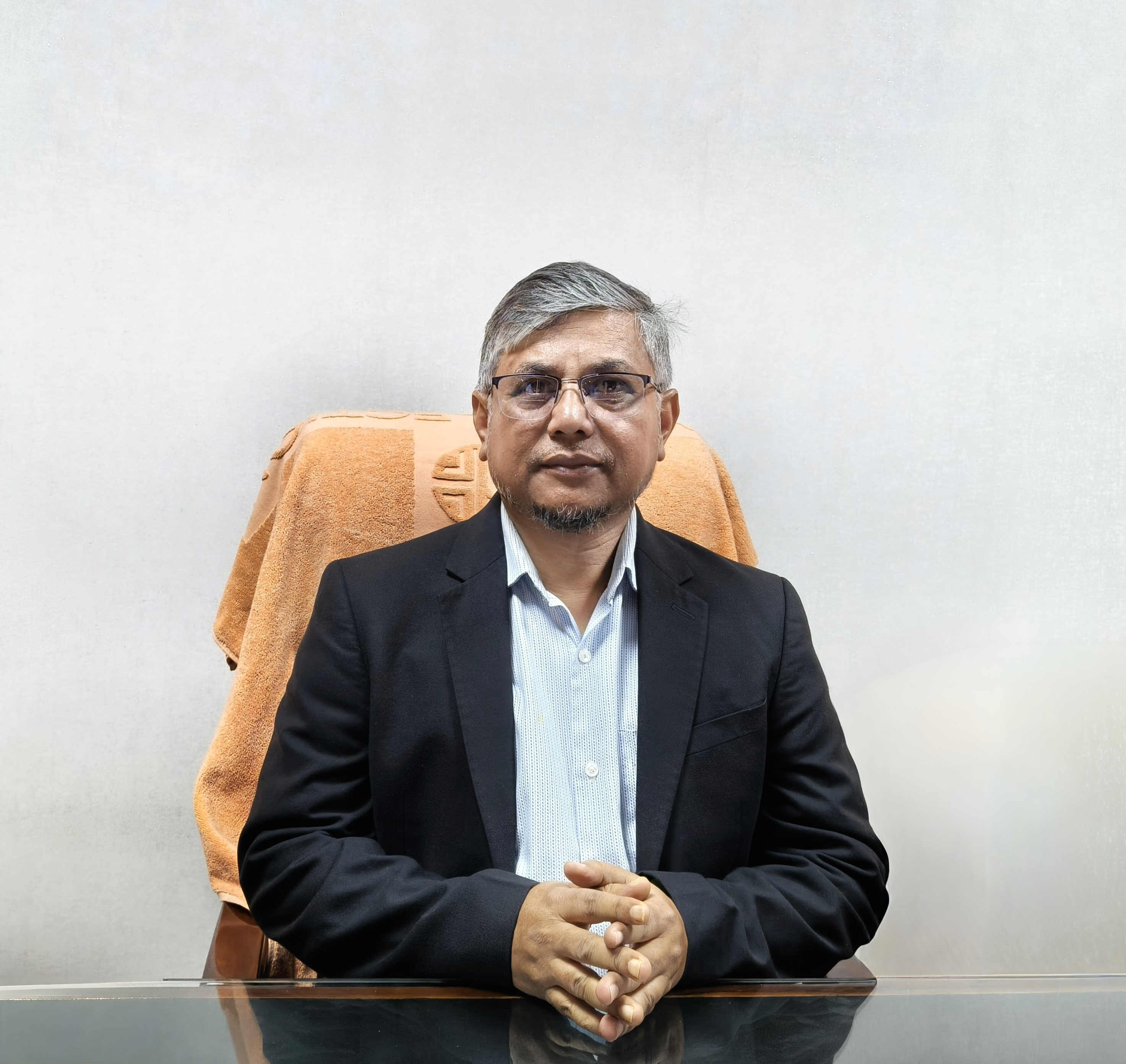

Vice-Chancellor

Khulna Agricultural University
- Incumbent
- Assumed office 28 July 2026
- Preceded by: Nazmul Ahsan

Personal details
- Born: January 1, 1975 (age 51) Darbasta, Gobindaganj Upazila, Gaibandha District, Bangladesh
- Spouse: Mahmuda Hoque
- Children: 3
- Education: Hashbari Multilateral High School, Gaibandha; Bogura Cantonment Public School and College, Bogura; Bangladesh Agricultural University (BS, 1999; MS, 2001); Yamaguchi University (MS, 2007); Tottori University (PhD, 2010)
- Occupation: Professor, university administrator

Md. Asaduzzaman Sarker (born 1 January, 1975) is a Bangladeshi agricultural scientist, researcher and academic administrator. He is a professor in the Department of Agricultural Extension Education at Bangladesh Agricultural University and has served as the Vice-Chancellor of Khulna Agricultural University since 28 July 2026.

== Early life and education ==
Md. Asaduzzaman Sarker was born on 1 January 1975 in Darbasta, Gobindaganj Upazila, Gaibandha District, Bangladesh. He received his early education at Hashbari Multilateral High School in Gaibandha and later attended Bogura Cantonment Public School and College. He then attended Bangladesh Agricultural University, from which he earned a Bachelor of Science in agriculture in 1999, followed by a Master of Science (MS) in agriculture in 2001. He then received an MS in bio-resources science from Yamaguchi University in 2007, followed by a Doctor of Philosophy in bio-production science from Tottori University in 2010.

== Academic career ==
Sarker has been associated with Bangladesh Agricultural University, where he has served as a professor in the Department of Agricultural Extension Education.

On 28 July 2026, Sarker was appointed Vice-Chancellor of Khulna Agricultural University and became the university's fourth Vice-Chancellor. In August 2026, He was appointed as a part-time member of the University Grants Commission of Bangladesh (UGC).

== Courtesy Call on the President of Bangladesh ==
On 19 November 2026, Md. Asaduzzaman Sarker, Vice-Chancellor of Khulna Agricultural University, led a university delegation on a courtesy call on President Mirza Fakhrul Islam Alamgir at Bangabhaban. During the meeting, he briefed the President on the university's academic and research activities and its overall progress. He also invited the President to attend the university's upcoming convocation, which the President accepted. The delegation also informed the President about the university's development of climate-resilient food crops in the southern region of Bangladesh despite challenges posed by climate change and salinity.
