= Fisheries Society of Bangladesh =

Non-profit based in Bangladesh focused on fisheries

The Fisheries Society of Bangladesh (FSB) is the oldest and the largest non-profit scientific society for fisheries professionals in Bangladesh. Established in 1977, the society serves as a platform for professionals, educators and researchers in the fisheries and aquaculture sector to collaborate, share knowledge and contribute to the sustainable development of the sector in the country. The FSB also collaborates with government agencies, academic institutions and international organizations to promote sustainable practices and capacity-building initiatives.

Membership in the Fisheries Society of Bangladesh (FSB) provides various resources for fisheries professionals, educators, and researchers. Individuals holding a degree or diploma in any branch of fisheries science, or those involved in fisheries research, education, and development in Bangladesh, are eligible to join. This society functions as a platform for advancing fisheries science and practices within the country. Membership is available to citizens of Bangladesh; foreign nationals are generally not eligible for membership.

One of the key benefits of FSB membership is access to a vast network of fisheries professionals from diverse backgrounds. This network enables members to share knowledge, collaborate on research projects and develop innovative solution to challenges faced by the sector. Regularly organized seminars, workshops and conferences (FSB2019 Biennial, FSB2021 2nd Biennial, FSB2023 3rd Biennial Conference provide members with opportunities to stay updated on the latest advancements in fisheries science and technology. The FSB actively fosters professional growth and provides members with opportunities for networking, capacity building and collaboration on national and international levels. FSB membership also opens doors to publish in society's journal (Bangladesh Journal of Fisheries), allowing members to share their findings and gain recognition for their works. Members receive access to a repository of resources, including research papers, reports and case studies which serve as valuable tools for education and practical applications.

Late National Professor A. K. M. Aminul Haque was the founding president of the society. Its president from 2017 to 2018 was Muhammad Shahidul Haq of Bangladesh Agricultural University (BAU). Md. Abul Mansur of BAU is the current president of the society.

== Aims and objectives ==
The Society's stated objectives are:

1. To work for development of fisheries science and to apply acquired knowledge to solve practical problems. The word Fisheries includes any aquatic plants and animals having economic importance.
2. To encourage research in various areas of fisheries and aquaculture
3. To organize seminars, symposia, conferences, excursion and field study in the field of fisheries.
4. To develop and maintain fund through donation and subscription to accomplish the aims and objectives of the Society.
5. To make provisions for appreciation through fellowships and medal for enhancing research and extension activities.
6. To disseminate fisheries knowledge and technology to the stakeholders through:

- Direct contact with the people
- Recommendations to appropriate GOs and NGOs
- Publications of Journals and periodicals.

The Society aims to encourage, promote and support all branches of fisheries science, aquaculture and conservation. In addition, the Society shall have the following powers to:

- convene and provide financial support for meetings on appropriate aspects of fish biology and fisheries science and conservation;
- disseminate research and technical information through the agency of the Society’s journal The Bangladesh Journal of Fisheries and by other means;
- collect and disseminate information on all matters affecting the above-mentioned activities and exchange such information with other bodies having similar objects whether in this country or overseas.

== Operations ==
Every two years the Society holds a conference of scientists from home and abroad and discuss critical areas in which the members are deeply involved. These events serve as important forums for sharing research findings and formulating policy recommendations to improve the fisheries sector in Bangladesh. In addition, each year the Society provides an opportunity for gathering of fisheries workers to learn new applications of technology and to exchange information with fellow professionals.

Through mass media, the Society generates among the people an awareness of the nature and causes of malnutrition and the role of the people can play to combat the same. Although not a lobbying organization, the Society does not hesitate to express its opinion on legislation and governmental policies and to make recommendations to the Government on fishery matters so as to help the Government formulate a national policy on the same commensurate with the hopes and aspirations of the nation.

As a leading voice in fisheries science, the society continues to play an important role in shaping the fisheries and aquaculture management in Bangladesh. Through its contributions, the FSB has solidified its position as a foundation of fisheries development in the country.

== Publications ==
=== Book of Abstracts ===
- FSB2019
- FSB2021
- FSB2023

=== Journals ===
FSB publishes one peer-reviewed journal including:

- Bangladesh Journal of Fisheries (BJF)
  - Executive Editor: Md. Ali Reza Faruk

=== Books ===
In 2024, FSB had published the following textbooks:

- Kamal, M., Reza, M.S., Hossain, M.I., Shikha, F.H., Hasan, M.M, editors (September 2024). "Fishing Technology in Bangladesh". Fisheries Society of Bangladesh, pages 432. ISBN 978-984-36-0036-3

== Scientific event ==
- Fisheries Society of Bangladesh Biennial Conference (FSB2019): December 27–28, 2019
- Fisheries Society of Bangladesh 2nd Biennial Conference (FSB2021): December 25–26, 2021
- Fisheries Society of Bangladesh-Young Fisheries Scientists Conference (FSB-YFSC-2023): 18 February 2023
- Fisheries Society of Bangladesh 3rd Biennial International Conference (FSB-2023): 17–18 February 2024
