= Ashrafi Khanam =

Bangladeshi singer

- Born: Paril-Naohadda, Singair Upazila, Manikganj, East Bengal, British Raj
- Other name: Kumari Baby
- Occupation: Singer
- Years active: 1930s
- Style: Nazrul Geeti
- Relatives: Begum Badrunnessa Ahmed (aunt)

Ashrafi Khanam, also known as Kumari Baby, was a Bengali singer who specialized in Nazrul Geeti. She was the first female Bengali Muslim to have her songs recorded on a phonograph record.

== Biography ==
Ashrafi Khanam was born into a well-off land-owning family in Paril-Naohadda, Singair Upazila, Manikganj, East Bengal, British Raj. Both her father, Ali Ahamd Hamidullah Khan, and grandfather, Muazzam Hussain Khan, were patrons of music who had a keen interest in it. They supported and fostered her appreciation for music during her childhood. She studied music at a young age with the support of her family.

Khanam moved to Kolkata, West Bengal, with her aunt, Begum Badrunnessa Ahmed. She wanted to broaden her horizon with the increased opportunities available in Kolkata. She studied Nazrul Geeti, the music of Kazi Nazrul Islam, the future National Poet of Bangladesh, whom she studied under. She started using the pseudonym Kumari Baby. In 1934, she recorded four Nazrul Geeti in a phonograph record at the Twin Brothers studio in Kolkata.
