= Sylhet Agricultural University =

University in Sylhet, Bangladesh

- সিলেট কৃষি বিশ্ববিদ্যালয়
- Type: Public agricultural university
- Established: 1995: Sylhet Government Veterinary College (SGVC); 2006: Sylhet Agricultural University
- Chancellor: President Hafiz Uddin Ahmad
- Vice-Chancellor: Md. Alimul Islam
- Academic staff: 263
- Administrative staff: Officers: 157, Staff: 267
- Students: 3,000
- Location: Tilagor, Sylhet-3100, Bangladesh. 24.9092°N 91.9020°E
- Campus: Current Temporary Campus(Tilagor):55 acres (22 ha). Permanent Campus(Khadimnagar):200 acres (81 ha).; Suburban
- Website: sau.ac.bd

University rankings

Regional – Overall
- QS Asia: 801-850 (2026)

Sylhet Agricultural University (SAU) (Bengali: সিলেট কৃষি বিশ্ববিদ্যালয়) is a public university of Bangladesh. This agricultural research university located in Sylhet division formally started functioning on 2 November 2006. It currently runs undergraduate, masters and PhD programs.

== History ==
Sylhet Agricultural University started its function on 2 November 2006 following the issuance of a notification by the Government as per the requirement of the "Sylhet Agricultural University Act 2006" which was passed in the National Parliament on 3 October 2006. In fact, the faculty of Veterinary, Animal and Biomedical Sciences has come into being through the up-gradation of Sylhet Government Veterinary College (SGVC). The SGVC was established in 1995 and had been functioning as a "School of Life Sciences" under Shahjalal University of Science and Technology (SUST),Sylhet, Bangladesh.

== Admission ==
Both national and international students can apply for the admission procedure. Starting in 2019, a cluster system admission test was employed for the admission of undergraduate program. There's only written MCQ type exam for the selection. If one is selected, he or she admit to a faculty according to the merit list. A single exam is taken for nine universities which provide education in the field of agricultural sciences, namely: Gazipur Agricultural University, Bangladesh Agricultural University, Chittagong Veterinary and Animal Sciences University, Khulna Agricultural University, Patuakhali Science and Technology University, Sher-e-Bangla Agricultural University, Habiganj Agricultural University, Kurigram Agricultural University and Sylhet Agricultural University. Basically every year one individual university among the cluster takes the responsibility to control the whole undergraduate admission procedure. And as for the masters and Ph.D. program participants must contact with the corresponding faculties.

== Faculties and departments ==
As it's an agricultural university of Bangladesh, it has faculty rather than departments. Each faculty has multiple departments under them. SAU has 7 faculties with 47 departments for providing undergraduate and graduate studies, faculties are:

1. Faculty of Veterinary, Animal and Biomedical Sciences
2. Faculty of Agriculture
3. Faculty of Fisheries
4. Faculty of Agricultural Economics and Business Studies
5. Faculty of Agricultural Engineering and Technology
6. Faculty of Biotechnology and Genetic Engineering
7. Postgraduate Studies

== Vice-chancellors ==
While the chancellor is the ceremonial head, a position held by the incumbent President of Bangladesh, the vice-chancellor is the chief academic officer and chief executive of the university, appointed by the Chancellor for a four-year term. These have been and are:

SL No.	Vice-chancellor	Duration
1	Iqbal Hossain	2007-01-03 - 2009-03-08
2	Abdul Awal	2009-03-09 - 2010-09-08
3	Shahid Ullah Talukder	2010-09-09 - 2014-09-27
4	M. Golam Shahi Alam	2014-09-28 - 2018-09-27
5	Md. Matiar Rahman Howlader	2018-09-28 – 2022-09-27
6	Jamal Uddin Bhuiyan	2022-11-21 – 2024-08-21
7	Md. Alimul Islam	2024-10-17 - present
