= Begum Badrunnessa Ahmed =

Bangladeshi feminist and social worker

- বেগম বদরুন্নেসা আহমেদ
- Born: 1903; Singair, Manikganj District, Bengal Presidency, British India
- Died: 20 April 1980 (aged 76–77); Dhaka, Bangladesh
- Occupation: Social worker
- Spouse: Moslehuddin Ahmed
- Father: Muazzam Hussain Khan
- Relatives: Ashrafi Khanam (niece)

Begum Badrunnessa Ahmed (1903 – 20 April 1980) was a Bangladeshi social activist.

== Biography ==
=== Early life and education ===
Ahmed was born in 1903 in Singair, Manikganj District in the then British India into the Paril Zamidar family. She married Kolkata based businessman Moslehuddin Ahmed. She moved to Kolkata after her marriage where she worked to promote female education.

=== Career ===
In 1930, Ahmed joined the Managing Committee of Abdullah Suhrawardi Girls' School. She worked to prevent religious riots in Mirzapur street of Kolkata during the Kolkata 1946 riots on Direct Action Day. She moved to Gendaria, Dhaka, East Pakistan in 1951 after the Partition of India. She founded Gendaria Primary School and was a founding member of Bulbul Academy of Fine Arts. She was a member of the All Pakistan Women's Association. In 1960, Ahmed started her teaching career at Muslim Girls' High School.

== Death and legacy ==
Ahmed died on 20 April 1980 in Dhaka and was buried in Azimpur Graveyard. She was awarded Tamgha-i-Pakistan, which she gave up during the 1969 uprising in East Pakistan. Her niece, Ashrafi Khanam, was the first female Muslim musician to be recorded in Bengal.
