= Shahidur Rahman Khan =

Shahidur Rahman Khan is a Bangladeshi academic and the former Vice Chancellor of Khulna Agricultural University. He is a professor of Bangladesh Agricultural University.

== Early life ==
Khan completed his SSC from Noagaon Janakalyan High School and HSC from Ramgonj Degree College in 1980 and 1982 respectively. He did his undergrad in veterinary medicine, DVM, at the Bangladesh Agricultural University in 1986. He completed his master's degree in microbiology at the Bangladesh Agricultural University in 1987. He completed his PhD at Leipzig University in virology in 1999. He did his postdoc in Japan at the National Institute of Animal Health in 2003.

== Career ==
Khan was a lecturer at Bangladesh Agricultural University from 21 June 1993 to 7 March 1996. He was an assistant professor from 8 March 1996 to 24 November 2000.

Khan was an associate professor from 25 November 2000 to 25 July 2005 at the Bangladesh Agricultural University. He was promoted to Professor on 26 July. He was the general secretary of Ganotantrik Shikkhok Forum, a panel of pro-Awami League faculty, at the Bangladesh Agricultural University.

Khulna Agricultural University was founded with the passage of Khulna Agricultural University Act in 2015. Khan was appointed its first Vice-chancellor.

In August 2022, Khulna Agricultural University stopped recruitment of 77 faculty personnel following controversies over irregularities such as the hiring Khan's wife Ferdousi Begum, following instructions of the Ministry of Education. Khan has also recruited his son, Shafiur Rahman Khan, his daughter, Israt Khan, brother in law, and four nephews in different posts at the Khulna Agricultural University. In total, khan had recruited or tried to recruit nine family members. On 10 September 2022, Khan's tenure as the Vice Chancellor of Khulna Agricultural University was over.

The Anti-Corruption Commission began an investigation against Khan in January 2023 over irregularities at the Khulna Agricultural University. The University Grants Commission is carrying out a parallel investigation. On 13 March 2023, Khan was sued on charges of rape at the Khulna Women and Child Abuse Prevention Tribunal-3 by a female employee of the Bangladesh Agricultural University. The employee worked as the personnel assistant of Khan. The woman divorced her husband after Khan promised to marry her but afterwards changed his mind. He was sent to jail in May 2023. The register of the university, Khandkar Mazharul Anwar, who was also accused in the case was able to receive bail.
