= A K Fazlul Haque Bhuiyan =

Bangladeshi academic

A. K. Fazlul Haque Bhuiyan
- এ কে ফজলুল হক ভূঁইয়া
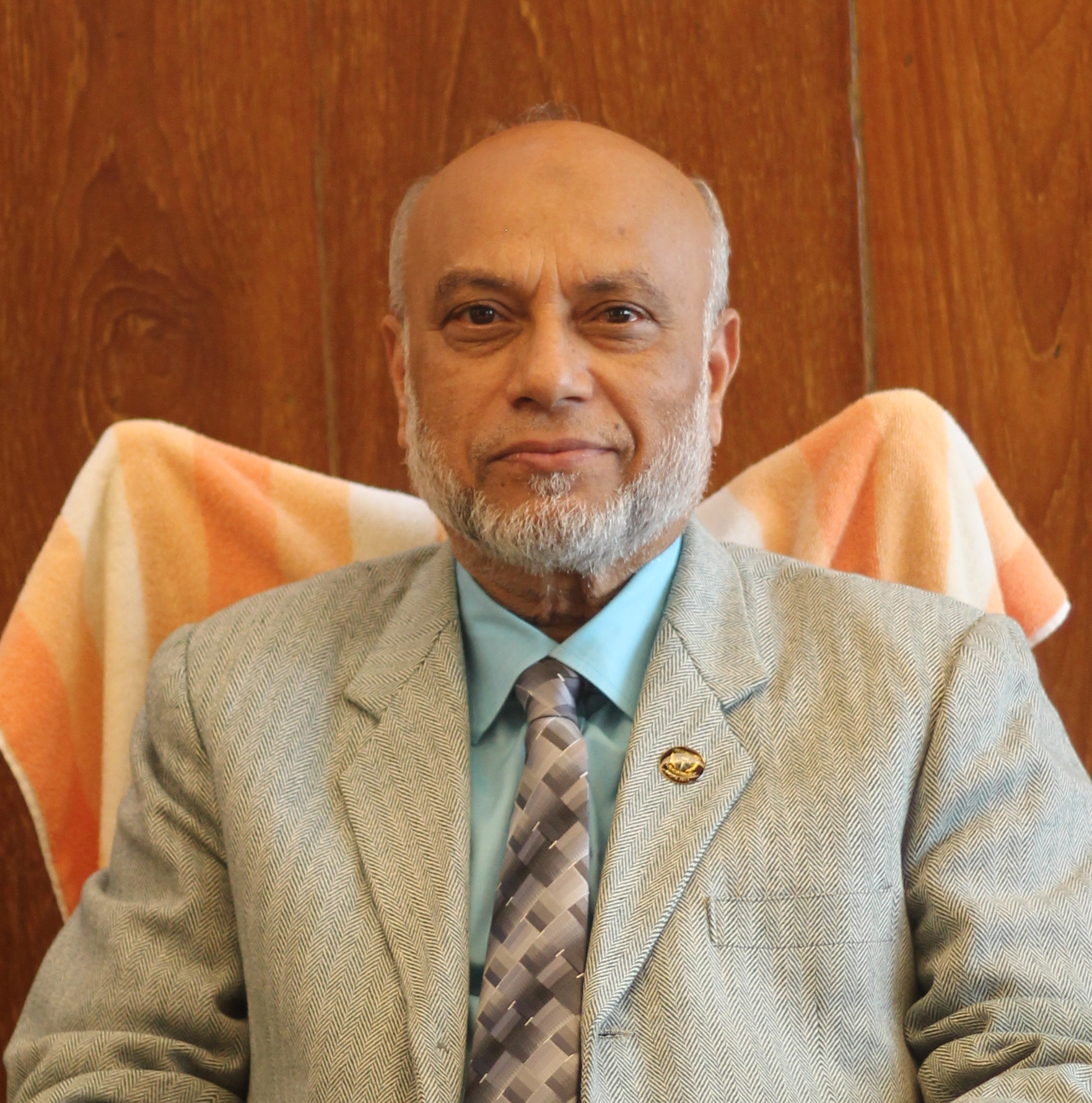
- Fazlul in 2024

26th Vice-chancellor of Bangladesh Agricultural University
- Incumbent
- Assumed office 19 September 2024
- Preceded by: Emdadul Haque Chowdhury

Personal details
- Born: Gazipur Sadar, Gazipur District, Bangladesh
- Education: Bangladesh Agricultural University; University of London
- Occupation: Academic

A. K. Fazlul Haque Bhuiyan is a Bangladeshi academic and current vice-chancellor of Bangladesh Agricultural University.

== Early life and education ==
Bhuiyan was born in Sadar Upazila of Gazipur District. His father is Abdul Gaffar Bhuiyan, and his mother is Cholema Khatun. Fazlul graduated from the Faculty of Animal Husbandry of Bangladesh Agricultural University in 1981 and received his master's degree from the Department of Animal Breeding in 1983. He obtained his PhD in Animal Breeding from the University of London, United Kingdom, in 1989.

== Career ==
Bhuiyan joined the Department of Animal Breeding and Genetics of Bangladesh Agricultural University in 1983 as a lecturer. Following this, he was promoted to the rank of assistant professor in 1986, associate professor in 1992, and professor in 1997.

Bhuiyan had previously been the dean of the Faculty of Animal Husbandry. He was also the convenor of the Dean's Council. He has also headed the university's Agriculturalist Association of Bangladesh branch and has been an elected representative of BAU's teachers' association multiple times. He was the president of the pro-Bangladesh Nationalist Party teachers association.

The Ministry of Education announced on 19 September 2024 that Bhuiyan would become the 26th vice-chancellor of the BAU for a tenure of four years.

== Books ==
Evaluation of artificially incubated indigenous chicken.
