= M. Golam Shahi Alam =

Bangladeshi academic (born 1952)

- Born: 2 February 1952; Jhenaidah, Jessore, Khulna, East Bengal, Dominion of Pakistan
- Education: Ph.D, Veterinary Clinical Science (Thesis: Stress and Reproduction in Cows) MSc (Veterinary Science) in Medicine Doctor of Veterinary Medicine (DVM)
- Alma mater: Bangladesh Agricultural University (DVM, 1974; MSc, 1975) Swedish University of Agricultural Sciences (FRVCS, 1981) University of Liverpool (PhD, 1985) Royal Veterinary College (Postdoc, 1991) National Institute of Animal Industry (STA fellow, 1998) Nagoya University (JSPS fellow, 2002) Iwate University (JSPS fellow, 2011)

M. Golam Shahi Alam (Bengali: প্রফেসর ড. এম. গোলাম শাহি আলম; born: 2 February 1952) is a Bangladeshi academic, currently working as one of the members of Bangladesh Accreditation Council. He is a former vice-chancellor of Sylhet Agricultural University. Prior to this, Shahi Alam was a professor of Surgery and Obstetrics department under Veterinary faculty of Bangladesh Agriculture University, Mymensingh.

== Personal life ==
Md. Golam Shahi Alam was born on 2 February 1952 at Sondah, Shailakupa Police Station from Jhenaidah District in Khulna Division, Bangladesh. His father's name is Md. Golam Kibria, was a Retired Deputy Superintendent of Police, and mother's name is Anowara Begum. His grandfather name is Md. Golam Rahman was the deputy director (Eastern Range) of Civil Veterinary Department, Dhaka.

== Education ==
Md. Golam Shahi Alam received a first class Doctor of Veterinary Medicine (DVM) degree from the Bangladesh Agricultural University, Mymensingh, in 1974. And under the supervision of Professor Abdur Rahman he gained M.Sc.(Vet Science) degree in medicine from the same university in 1975. In 1981 he attended the 14 FAO/SIDA International Postgraduate Course in Animal Reproduction in Swedish University of Agricultural Sciences, Uppsala, Sweden. Because of his outstanding achievement, he becomes the Fellow Royal Veterinary College, Sweden (FRVCS) from there. Under the supervision of Emeritus Professor Hilary Dobson, he was awarded PhD degree from University of Liverpool, England, UK in 1985 after the successful completion of his work on Stress and Fertility in Cows. He did his post-doctoral research on intrauterine cellular defence mechanism in cows with Professor David Noakes from the Department of Large Animal Medicine & Surgery, Royal Veterinary College, University of London, England, UK.

== Career ==
Md. Golam ĺShahi Alam worked as an academic staff of the Bangladesh Agriculture University, Mymensingh since 1977 in the Department of Surgery & Obstetrics, Faculty of Veterinary Science. Then he became a professor of the Department of Surgery & Obstetrics, Faculty of Veterinary Science. He served as the head of the department for 4 years and dean for 2 years. Also he was appointed as Coordinator, Committee for Advanced Studies and Research for 2 years. He worked as a syndicate member of BAU and Jatiya Kabi Kazi Nazrul Islam University, Trisal, Mymensingh. He has been an authority of the Jessore University of Science & Technology since 2013. Shahi Alam was appointed as the fourth vice chancellor of Sylhet Agricultural University in September 2014. He was a visiting research fellow at the National Institute of Animal Industry, Tsukuba, Nagoya and Iwate Universities, Japan in 1998, 2002 and 2011, respectively.

== Awards and honors ==
- NST Fellowship from Bangladesh National Science & Technology division, Ministry of Education, Bangladesh,
- FAO/SIDA Fellowship,
- FAO Rome, Italy,
- Postgraduate Research Studentship from the University of Liverpool, UK.,
- Overseas Research Students (ORS) Award by the Committee of the Vice-Chancellors and Principals of the Universities and Colleges of the United Kingdom,
- European Commission (EC) Postdoctoral Fellowship from Brussels, Belgium,
- Science & Technology Agency (STA) Fellowship from Japan,
- Japan Society for Promotion of Science (JSPS) Fellowship.

Shahi Alam visited many countries of Asia, Africa and Europe including United Kingdom, Netherlands, Sweden, Norway, Denmark, Malaysia, Indonesia, Philippine, Singapore, Japan, Egypt and Liberia.

== Publications ==
Shahi Alam is experienced in research of 32 years broadly in the field of dairy cattle reproduction and health. In his long professional career, he has been co-authored of more than 70 scientific papers. Around hundred of his scientific papers have been published in different peer reviewed journals. He is also an author of two books.
