= Abdul Karim (soil scientist) =

Bangladeshi soil scientist

- Born: c. 1922; Comilla District, East Bengal, British India
- Died: December 22, 1973
- Education: Dhaka College; University of Dhaka; University of Adelaide
- Organization: Bangladesh Agricultural University

Abdul Karim (c. 1922 – December 22, 1973) was a widely published Bangladeshi soil scientist.

== Education and career ==
Abdul Karim passed the matriculation examination in 1939 from Homna High School and Higher Secondary School Certificate examination in 1942 from Dhaka College. He obtained BS and MS degrees in chemistry from University of Dhaka in 1945 and 1946 respectively. He lectured in this field at the same university. A UNESCO fellowship enabled him to obtain a PhD in soil science at the University of Adelaidein 1951. He returned to Dhaka University's newly formed Department of Soil Science, becoming department head in 1963.

He was the first head of the Agricultural Chemistry Department at the Bangladesh Agricultural University. He also served as Dean of the Faculty of Agriculture.

Abdul Karim worked in the fields of biogas technology, new sources for edible oils, and new techniques for glass production.

== Awards ==
- President's Gold medal (posthumous) in 1980
