= Md. Matiar Rahman Howlader =

Bangladeshi academic

Md. Matiar Rahman Howlader is a Bangladeshi academic and a former vice chancellor of Sylhet Agricultural University.

== Early life and education ==
Howlader was born in 1957 in Mollikerber, Rampal Upazila, Bagerhat District, East Pakistan, Pakistan. He fought in the Bangladesh Liberation War in 1971 as a child soldier at the age of 13. He served in sector 9 under Major Ziauddin Ahmed.

Howlader finished his SSC from Fulhata High School and his HSC from Govt. Sundarban Adarsha College, Khulna in 1973 and 1975, respectively. He received his Doctor of Veterinary Medicine in 1979 from Bangladesh Agricultural University. He completed his master's degree from Bangladesh Agricultural University in 1980. He completed his PhD at the University of the Philippines Los Baños in 1983.

== Career ==
In 2000, Howlader was the chairman of the Department of Physiology. He became a full professor at Sylhet Agricultural University in 2003. He served as the dean of the Faculty of Fisheries for 4.5 years. He served as the director of the Teaching Veterinary Hospital. He was a member of the syndicate board. He is the founder of Gonotantrik Sikkhok Parishad, the pro-Awami League teachers association.

From 16 March 2015 to December 2018, Howlader served as the director of Student Counseling and Guidance of Sylhet Agricultural University.

In April 2022, teachers at Sylhet Agricultural University protested against Howlader for allegedly "misbehaving" with two of their colleagues. He is under investigation by the University Grants Commission.

Howlader was appointed as the vice-chancellor of Sylhet Agricultural University on 24 September 2018 and officially took over as the vice-chancellor of the University on September 28.
