= Shahanaz Sultana =

Bangladeshi Scientist

Doctor Shahanaz Sultana
- শাহানাজ় সুলতানা
- Born: 30 August 1971 (age 55); Tangail District
- Education: University of Toronto; Bangladesh Agricultural University; University of Putra Malaysia
- Awards: Ekushey Padak (2022)

Shahanaz Sultana (Bengali: শাহানাজ় সুলতানা; [ʃaɦanaz sult̪ana]; born 30 August 1971) Is a Bangladeshi agricultural officer and Scientist. She is the Chief Scientific Officer of the Department of Biotechnology, Bangladesh Rice Research Institute. She was awarded the Ekushey Padak in 2022 by the Government of Bangladesh as part of a team for their significant contribution in research on the production of high yielding varieties of paddy.

== Early life ==
Shahanaz Sultana graduated from the Department of Science, Bangladesh Agricultural University in 1992 and obtained her master's degree in 1997. She received her PhD in Genetic Engineering and Molecular Biology in 2010 from University of Putra Malaysia. She completed an additional academic course from the University of Toronto on the bioinformatics method.

== Career ==
Shahanaz Sultana has been the Chief Scientific Officer of the Department of Biotechnology at the Bangladesh Rice Research Institute since July 2018. She has been working at Bangladesh Rice Research Institute since 1998.

She is a member of the Plant Breeding and Genetic Society of Bangladesh, Professional Organization of Women in Extension and Research, Krishibid Institution, Bangladesh Association of Plant Tissue Culture and Biotechnology and Organization for Women in Science and Development.

=== Research work ===
Shahanaz teamed up with two other researchers, Md. Enamul Haque and Jannatul Ferdous, to develop the high-yielding variety Brie Dhan-89 instead of the popular rice Brie Dhan-29 in Bangladesh. In 2018, this rice variety was released. The average yield per hectare is 8 tons. Farmers can harvest in 154 to 158 days.

== Award ==
- Ekushey Padak- 2022
