= Joymontop Union =

Coordinates: 23.8071°N 90.1810°E

Joymontop Union is a Union in Singair, Manikganj District, Bangladesh.

Joymontop High School
