= Fish Museum & Biodiversity Centre =

Coordinates: 24.725°N 90.428°E

The Fish Museum & Biodiversity Centre (FMBC) is located in Mymensingh, Bangladesh, in a space provided by Bangladesh Agricultural University. FMBC is one of the largest such centres in South East Asia given the size and diversity of its exhibits and collections.. The centre was established in 2009 and developed in partnership with Stirling University. Its goal is to encourage sustainable fishing.

== Visiting hour ==
The FMBC can be visited with prior contact on every Friday and Saturday (10.00-12.00 morning and 14.00 – 17.00 afternoon).
