= Kamaluddin Ahmad =

Bangladeshi scientist and academic

Kamaluddin Ahmad is a Bangladeshi academic often called Bangladesh's "father of biochemistry and nutrition". In the 1960s, he undertook a countrywide nutrition survey after which he introduced vitamin A capsules and iodine in salt. He was the founding head of the department of Biochemistry at the University of Dhaka.

== Early life ==
Ahmad was born on 21 December 1921 in Gohira, Chittagong District, East Bengal, British India. He completed his bachelor's degree and masters in chemistry at the University of Dhaka in 1943 and 1944 respectively. In 1949, he finished his PhD at the University of Wisconsin.

== Career ==
Ahmad joined the University of Dhaka where he established the Department of Biochemistry in 1957. He was awarded the Pakistan Academy gold medal in Physical Sciences. He received a Research fellowship from the Southeast Asia Treaty Organization. He received the Commonwealth Travelling fellowship and taught at the University of Chicago, Harvard University, Tufts University, University of Wisconsin, University of Lincoln, and the University of Calcutta. He was the chairman of the Committee on Nutrition Survey and Surveillance of the International Union of Nutritional Sciences. In 1960, he was made a fellow of the Pakistan Academy of Sciences.

Ahmad received the Tamgha-e-Quaid-e-Azam and Sitara-i-Khidmat from the government of Pakistan. He received the Sonali Bank Gold Medal from the Bangladesh Academy of Sciences. He was the chairman of the Scientific Research Committee, Research Review Committee, and Ethical Review Committee of the International Center for Diarrhoeal Disease Research, Bangladesh. He was the chairperson of the Standing Technical Committee of Bangladesh National Nutrition Council. He is a former president of the Bangladesh Association for the Advancement of Science.

Ahmad established the Department of Pharmacy and Institute of Nutrition and Food Science in 1964 and 1969 respectively. In the 1960s, he performed the first nutrition survey of East Pakistan. From 1969 to 1971, he was the Vice-Chancellor of the Bangladesh Agricultural University. He performed further surveys in Bangladesh in the 1970s and 1980s. He was a syndicate board member of Bangladesh Agricultural University, Jahangirnagar University, and the University of Chittagong.

Ahmad retired from the University of Dhaka in 1984. He established Bangladesh Institute of Herbal Medicine, Nutrition and Social Development located in Savar Upazila. In 1996, he established the Centre for Biomedical Research at the University of Dhaka. He was one the founders of Bangladesh Academy of Sciences and had served as its president. He was a fellow of the Bangladesh Institute of Development Studies, The World Academy of Sciences, and the Bangladesh Academy of Sciences.

== Death ==
Ahmad died on 4 July 2004.
