= Ali Akbar (academic) =

Bangladeshi academic

23rd Vice-chancellor of Bangladesh Agricultural University
- In office 24 May 2015 – 23 May 2019
- Preceded by: Rafiqul Haque
- Succeeded by: Lutful Hassan

Personal details
- Born: 10 March 1952 (age 74) Bogra District, East Bengal, Dominion of Pakistan
- Education: Bangladesh Agricultural University; University of Aberdeen
- Occupation: university academic, professor

Ali Akbar (born 10 March 1952) is a Bangladeshi academic. He is the former vice-chancellor of Bangladesh Agricultural University (BAU).

== Education and career ==
Akbar earned his bachelor's and master's from the Animal Husbandry Faculty at BAU in 1975 and 1977 respectively. He then joined as a lecturer in Animal Nutrition Department in 1977. He obtained his Ph.D. from the University of Aberdeen. He was promoted to a professor in 1993.

Upon the resignation of Rafiqul Haque, the previous vice-chancellor of BAU, Akbar was appointed to the position on 25 May 2015 for a four-year term.
