= Golaidanga High School =

School

Coordinates: 23°45′28″N 90°5′57″E

Golaidanga High School Golaidanga High School is a secondary school located in Golaidanga village at Balodhara Union under Singair Upazila in Manikgonj District, Bangladesh.

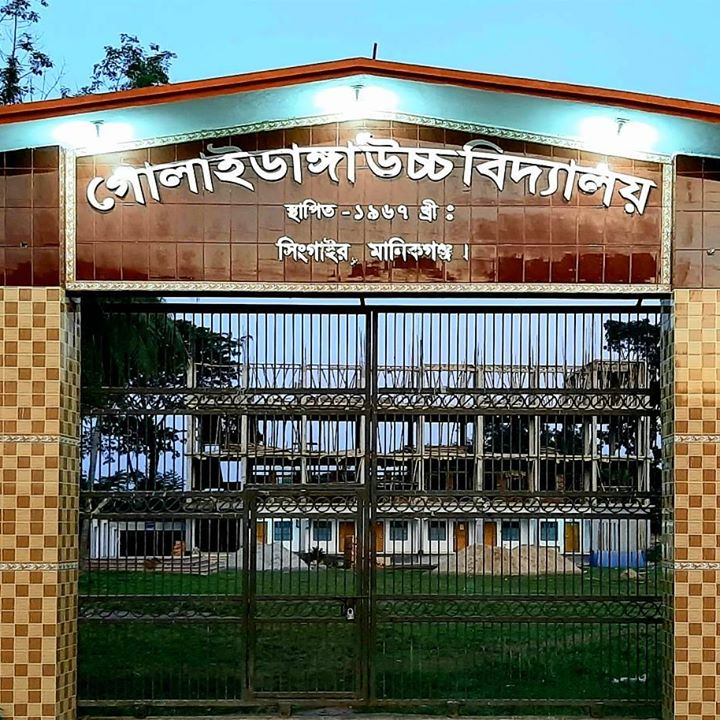
Golaidanga High School

It was founded in 1967 by the local scholar Mr. Ali Hossain

Golaidanga High School offers a coeducational system. The institute has three disciplines: science, humanities and business studies. The EIIN is 111066 and MPO number is 2807101303, under the Dhaka Education Board.
