= A. K. M. Aminul Haque =

Bangladeshi politician (1929–2022)

Vice-Chancellor of Bangladesh Agricultural University
- In office 1980–1988
- Preceded by: Mosleh Uddin Ahmed Chowdhury

Personal details
- Born: 1929
- Died: 29 August 2022 (aged 93)
- Education: University of Dhaka; University of the Punjab; University of Nottingham

A. K. M. Aminul Haque (1929 – 29 August 2022) was a Bangladeshi marine biologist who served as the vice-chancellor of Bangladesh Agricultural University for two terms during 1980–1988. In 2006, he was appointed as a National Professor by the government of Bangladesh for five years. He served as the director of marine of the Department of Fisheries under the Ministry of Fisheries and Livestock. He was an adviser, with the rank of minister, of the Shahabuddin Ahmed caretaker government.

== Education ==
Haque completed his bachelor's from the University of Dhaka in 1950 and master's from University of the Punjab in 1952. He earned his Ph.D. from the University of Nottingham in 1957. He specialized in fisheries and cetacean biology.

== Career ==
Haque was an elected fellow of Bangladesh Academy of Sciences since 1988. He served the vice-president of the institute during 2008–2012.

Haque founded the Faculty of Fisheries at Bangladesh Agricultural University. Haque, the "Father of Fisheries Education in Bangladesh" was the founder head of 3 (three) departments and the founder dean of the FoF as well. Haque served as head of the FT from 10 April 1967 to 20 June 1971.

== Death ==
Haque died at his home on 29 August 2022, at the age of 93.
