= Noazesh Ahmed =

Bangladeshi geneticist and photographer

- Born: 1 February; Paril Nowadha
- Education: the University of Wisconsin

Noazesh Ahmed (1 February 1935 – 24 November 2009) was a Bangladeshi geneticist and photographer.

== Early life ==
Ahmed was born on 1 February 1935 in Paril Nowadha, Singair Upazila, Manikganj District, East Bengal, British India. His father, Najibuddin Ahmed, was a zamindar and recipient of the title Khan Bahadur. In 1950, he passed his matriculation from Manikganj Victoria High School and his ISc in 1952. In 1954, he obtained his BA from East Bengal Agricultural Institute. He completed his PhD from the University of Wisconsin on plant genetics on a Fulbright Scholarship.

== Career ==
Ahmed joined Duncan Brothers Tea Estate in 1960 as a researcher. He carried out research on improving tea varieties and was subsequently made the general secretary of the Pakistan Tea Board. He worked at the Food and Agriculture Organization and the Asian Development Bank. He worked at the Asian Institute of Technology as a visiting faculty. He published a book in 1975 titled Development of Agriculture of Bangladesh.

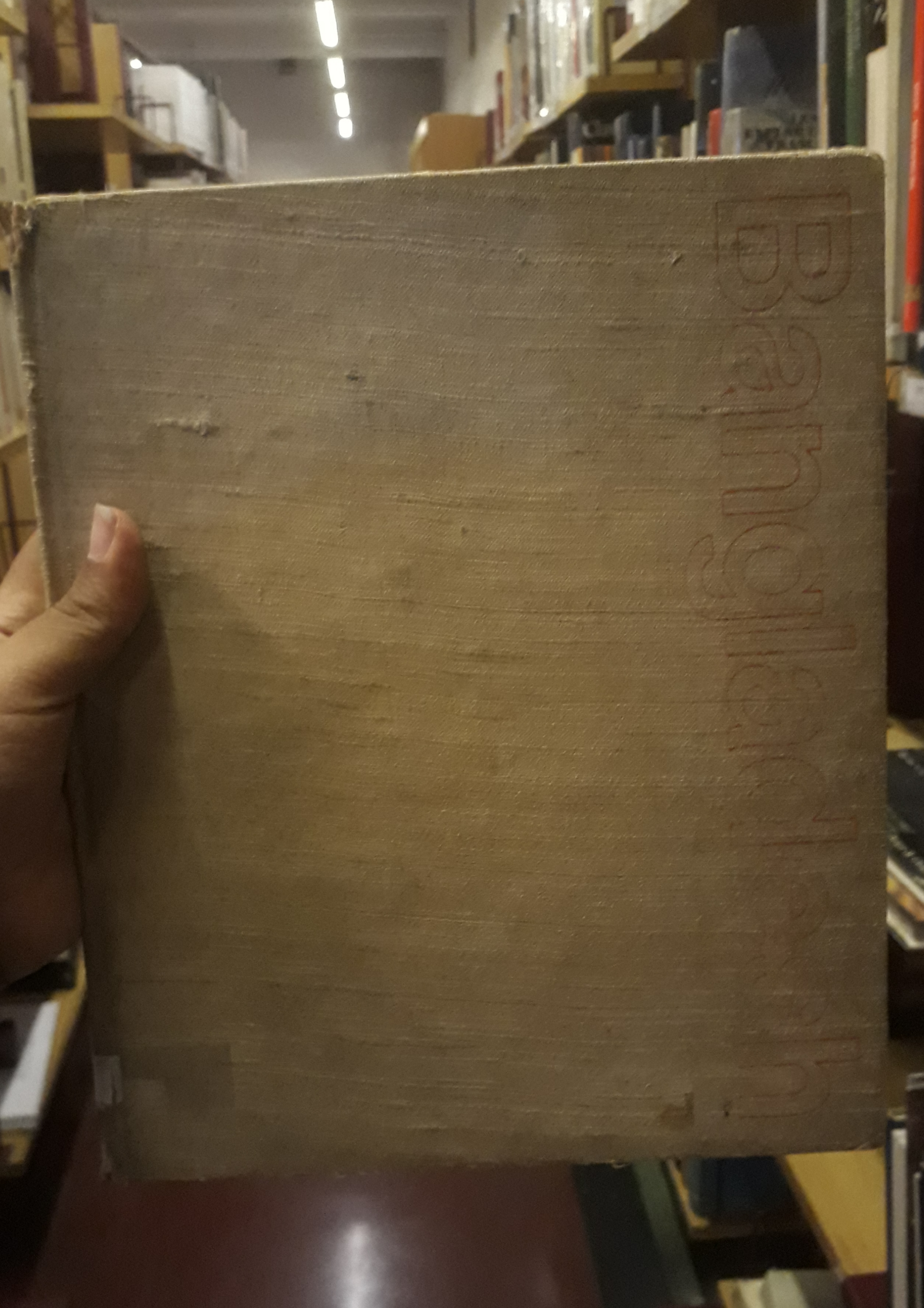
A photobook titled 'Bangladesh' by Noazesh Ahmed and Naib Uddin Ahmed

Ahmed also worked as a photographer, specializing in the photography of the flora of Bangladesh. His photographs have been published in reputed publications such as The Bangkok Post and The Guardian. In 1971, after the start of Bangladesh Liberation war, he resigned from Pakistan Tea Board and moved to London. He campaigned for the independence of Bangladesh from London. He moved to the United States from there and returned to Bangladesh in 1973. In 1975, he published a photography compilation book titled Bangladesh. The book received a special mention from the Royal Geographical Society. He was awarded the Shilpakala Academy Award in 1978. His paintings were exhibited in the Shilpakala Academy gallery in 1996 and Bengal Gallery in 1995. A bilingual edition of his photography book, Chhinnapatra, was published by Standard Chartered.

== Death ==
Ahmed died on 24 November 2009 in Dhaka, Bangladesh.
