= Emdadul Haque Chowdhury =

Bangladeshi academic

- এমদাদুল হক চৌধুরী

25th Vice-chancellor of Bangladesh Agricultural University
- In office 12 July 2023 – 11 August 2024
- Preceded by: Lutful Hassan

Personal details
- Born: 1966 (age 59–60) Fardipur, East Pakistan, Pakistan
- Education: Bangladesh Agricultural University; University of Zurich

Emdadul Haque Chowdhury (born 1966) is a Bangladeshi academic and a former vice-chancellor of Bangladesh Agricultural University.

== Early life ==
Chowdhury completed his undergrad in veterinary medicine and masters in veterinary science at the Bangladesh Agricultural University (BAU). He did his PhD at the Institute of Veterinary Pathology in the University of Zurich. He did his postdoc at the National Institute of Animal Health in Japan.

== Career ==
Chowdhury joined the BAU as a lecturer on 1 April 1995. He was promoted to assistant professor on 27 April 1999.

On 27 January 2004, Chowdhury was promoted to associate professor. He became a full professor on 27 January 2008. He is a patron of HOPES Foundation.

Chowdhury was a member of the syndicate board of Chittagong Veterinary and Animal Sciences University and Ishakha International University, Bangladesh.

In July 2023, Chowdhury was appointed the vice-chancellor of BAU. At the aftermath of Bangladesh Non-cooperation movement, on 11 August 2024, Chowdhury resigned from the position citing a deterioration in his physical and mental health.
