= Md. Shahidur Rashid Bhuiyan =

Bangladeshi academic

- শহীদুর রশীদ ভূঁইয়া
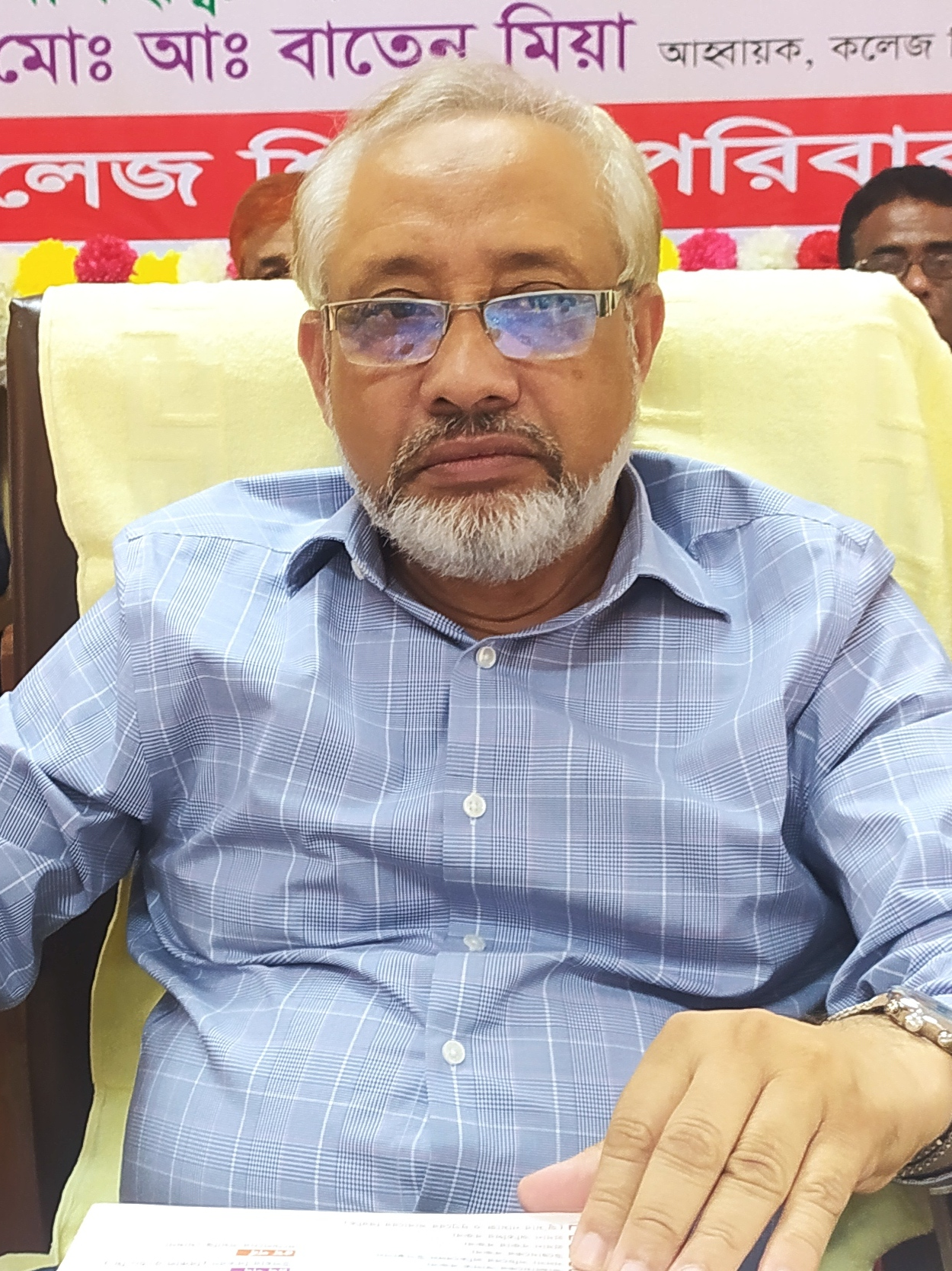
- Bhuiyan in 2022

Vice-chancellor of Sher-e-Bangla Agricultural University
- In office 17 November 2020 – 7 August 2024
- Preceded by: Kamal Uddin Ahmed

Personal details
- Born: 1956 (age 69–70) Narsingdi, East Pakistan, Pakistan
- Education: Bangladesh Agricultural University

Md. Shahidur Rashid Bhuiyan (born 1956) is a Bangladeshi academic and a former Vice-chancellor of Sher-e-Bangla Agricultural University served during 2020–2024. He was a professor of the Department of Genetics and Plant Breeding.

== Early life ==
Bhuiyan was born in 1956 in Belabo Upazila, Narsingdi District in the then East Pakistan. He completed his undergrad in agriculture at the Bangladesh Agricultural University in 1978. He completed his masters on genetics and plant breeding at the same university in 1979.

== Career ==
Bhuiyan joined the Bangladesh Agricultural Institute (later Sher-e-Bangla Agricultural University) in 1983 as a lecturer. Bangla Academy published his book on plant breeding in 1992.

In 2009, Bhuiyan wrote Genetically Modified Foshol Bartaman O Bhobishshot, one of the few books on Genetically modified organism food production in Bengali. He wrote PushpaKotha" (Flowers Fable) on flowers.

In July 2012, Bhuiyan was appointed pro vice-chancellor of Sher-e-Bangla Agricultural University under vice-chancellor Mohammad Shadat Ullah. He published a book on food nutrition, Khadda O Pushti Bhabna, in 2014. From 2017 to 2018, he was a managing committee member of the Plant Breeding and Genetics Society of Bangladesh.

Bhuiyan was appointed the vice-chancellor of Sher-e-Bangla Agricultural University in November 2020. He replaced Kamal Uddin Ahmed who retired in August. The Agriculture and Engineering Technology Development Society of Kashmir awarded him the Life Time Achievement Award in 2023. He is the president of Bangladesh Biology Olympiad.
