= Lutful Hassan =

Bangladeshi genetic engineer

- লুৎফুল হাসান
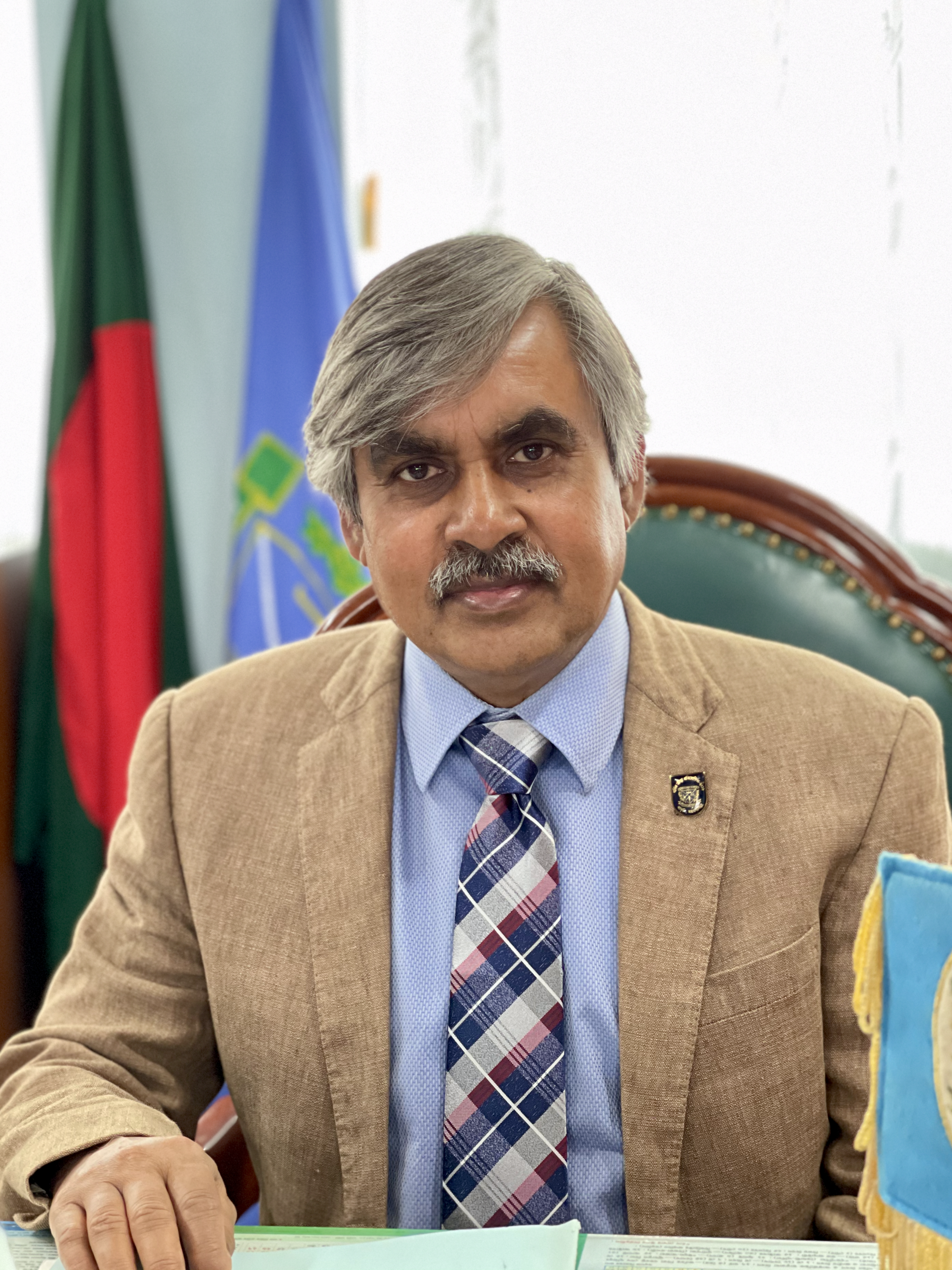

24th Vice-chancellor of Bangladesh Agricultural University
- In office 30 May 2019 – 29 May 2023
- Preceded by: Md. Ali Akbar
- Succeeded by: Emdadul Haque Chowdhury

Personal details
- Born: 28 January 1956 (age 70) Barisal District, East Pakistan, Pakistan
- Education: Bangladesh Agricultural University; University of Wales
- Occupation: professor, genetic engineer, biotechnologist, researcher, university academic

Lutful Hassan (born 28 January 1956) is a Bangladeshi genetic engineer. He served as 24th vice-chancellor of Bangladesh Agricultural University (BAU).

== Education ==
Lutful earned his bachelor's and master's from the Agriculture Faculty at BAU in 1976 and 1977 respectively. He obtained his Ph.D. from the University of Wales, Aberystwyth. He also did post doctoral researches under fellowships from UK, Japan, Germany and USA.

== Career ==
Hassan joined as a lecturer at the Department of Genetics & Plant Breeding, BAU in 1981. He was promoted to a professor in 1995.

He served as coordinator of Committee for Advanced Studies and Research (CASR), director of BAU Research System (BAURS) and president of BAU Teachers’ Association (BAUTA).

Lutful succeeds as the 24th vice-chancellor of BAU, appointed for the position on 30 May 2019 for a four-year term.

== Research works ==
Hassan's research focuses on molecular plant breeding, salinity and drought management, climate change adaptation in the smallholder systems of South and South East Asia, integration science and research on research for development.

He has 179 international and national research publications.
