= Bangladesh National Nutrition Council =

Research institute in Bangladesh

- Formation: 1975; 51 years ago
- Headquarters: Dhaka, Bangladesh
- Coordinates: 23.77781°N 90.40040°E
- Region served: Bangladesh
- Official language: Bengali
- Director General: Dr. Md Rizwanur Rahman
- Website: bnnc.portal.gov.bd

Bangladesh National Nutrition Council (BNNC) is an government body under ministry of Health and Family Welfare is an apex body for multisectoral coordination planning, monitoring, advocacy for nutrition and to formulate National Food and Nutrition Policy in Bangladesh and is located in IPH Building, Mohakhali, Dhaka, Bangladesh. The council is chaired by the Prime Minister.

== History ==
Bangladesh National Nutrition Council was established in 1975 on the orders of the President of Bangladesh. Since 1998 the council observes National Nutrition Week every year at national, district, and upazila level. The council publishes a journal twice every year called the South Asian Journal of Nutrition. The council also helps plan nutritional nutrient programs for relevant seventeen ministries. In 1994 with the help of the World Bank it carried out a national nutritional survey.
