= Ishakha International University, Bangladesh =

Private university in Kishorganj, Bangladesh

Ishakha International University
- Motto: Providing International Standard Higher Education
- Type: Private
- Established: 2012; 14 years ago
- Chancellor: President Hafiz Uddin Ahmad
- Vice-Chancellor: Priya Brata Paul
- Students: 700
- Location: 461, Nilganj Road, Sholakia,, Kishoregonj-2300, Bangladesh; 24°26′48″N 90°47′02″E
- Campus: Urban
- Website: www.ishakha.edu.bd
- Location within Bangladesh

Ishakha International University Bangladesh is a private university located in Kishorganj, Bangladesh. The government of Bangladesh approved its establishment in 2012 under the Private University Act (PUA) 1992 (now replaced by PUA 2010). Financial support came from the United Group, a Bangladeshi business conglomerate.

In 2016, the University Grants Commission declared original certificates issued by the university will be unacceptable without the signature of Vice-Chancellor appointment by the President,but it doesn't effect in case of provisional certificate.
