= Khulna Agricultural University =

Agricultural university in Khulna, Bangladesh

- খুলনা কৃষি বিশ্ববিদ্যালয়
- Motto: Bengali: জ্ঞান, দক্ষতা, প্রযুক্তি
- Motto in English: Knowledge, Skill, Technology
- Type: Public agricultural university
- Established: July 14, 2015; 11 years ago
- Budget: ৳27.71 cr (2024-25)
- Chancellor: President Mirza Fakhrul Islam Alamgir
- Vice-Chancellor: Md. Asaduzzaman Sarker
- Academic staff: 106
- Administrative staff: 297
- Students: 504
- Location: Deana, Daulatpur, Khulna (Temporary); Arangghata, Khulna (Permanent), Bangladesh; 22.8639°N 89.5156°E
- Campus: Urban
- Mascot: Banayan tree 🌳
- Website: kau.edu.bd

Khulna Agricultural University (Bengali: খুলনা কৃষি বিশ্ববিদ্যালয়) is a government-financed public university in Khulna, Bangladesh.

== History ==
In July 2015, parliament passed the Khulna Agriculture University Act, 2015, to establish the university. The first vice chancellor, Shahidur Rahman Khan, was appointed in September 2018. The official activities of the university started in temporary premises in the Sonadanga neighborhood of Khulna at the end of January 2019. Academic activities commenced in 2019 at Daulatpur College and another rented school building.

As of 2020, the university had been unable to attract associate professors or professors to its teaching staff, and was operating using guest teachers from other public universities. By September 2022, the end of VC Shahidur Rahman Khan's term of office, 426 people had been recruited, including his sons, daughters, brothers-in-law and nephews. In December 2023, 30 teachers, including 23 department heads, resigned in protest over nepotism and lack of transparency in hiring.

== List of vice-chancellors ==
- Shahidur Rahman Khan (September 2018 - September 2022)
- Abul Kashem Chowdhury (November 2022 - 28 October 2024)
- Md. Nazmul Ahsan (29 October 2024 - July 2026)
- Md. Asaduzzaman Sarker (28 July - Present)

== Faculties and departments ==
There are seven faculties in Khulna Agricultural University, which have 51 departments:

=== Faculty of Veterinary, Animal and Biomedical Sciences ===
- Department of Anatomy and Histology
- Department of Physiology
- Department of Pharmacology and Toxicology
- Department of Microbiology and Public Health
- Department of Livestock Production and Management
- Department of Pathology
- Department of Parasitology
- Department of Genetics and Animal Breeding
- Department of Dairy Science
- Department of Poultry Science
- Department of Epidemiology and Preventive Medicine
- Department of Animal Nutrition
- Department of Medicine
- Department of Surgery
- Department of Theriogenology

=== Faculty of Agriculture ===
- Department of Agronomy
- Department of Soil Science
- Department of Entomology
- Department of Horticulture
- Department of Plant Pathology
- Department of Crop Botany
- Department of Plant Genetics and Biotechnology
- Department of Agricultural Extension and Information Systems
- Department of Agroforestry
- Department of Agricultural Chemistry
- Department of Biochemistry and Molecular Biology

=== Faculty of Fisheries and Ocean Sciences ===
- Department of Fishery Biology and Genetics
- Department of Aquaculture
- Department of Fishery Resources Conservation and Management
- Department of Fisheries Technology and Quality Control
- Department of Oceanography
- Department of Fish Health Management

=== Faculty of Agricultural Economics and Agribusiness Studies ===
- Department of Agricultural Economics
- Department of Sociology and Rural Development
- Department of Agribusiness and Marketing
- Department of Agricultural Statistics and Bioinformatics
- Department of Agricultural Finance, Co-operative and Banking
- Department of Language and Communication Studies

=== Faculty of Agricultural Engineering and Technology ===
- Department of Farm Structure
- Department of Farm Power and Machinery
- Department of Irrigation and Water Management
- Department of Computer Science and Engineering
- Department of Mathematics and Physics

=== Faculty of Food Sciences and Safety ===
- Department of Food Engineering and Technology
- Department of Food Nutrition
- Department of Quality Control and Safety Management
- Department of Bioprocess Engineering

=== Faculty of Environment, Disaster Risks and Agro-Climatic Studies ===
- Department of Environment and Agroclimatic Studies
- Department of Forestry and Mangrove Studies
- Department of Wildlife Ecology
- Department of Disaster Risk Management

== Admission ==
From 2019, all agricultural universities in Bangladesh conduct a cluster system admission tests where a single exam is taken for seven universities which provide education in the field of agricultural sciences: Bangabandhu Sheikh Mujibur Rahman Agricultural University, Bangladesh Agricultural University, Sher-e-Bangla Agricultural University, Chittagong Veterinary and Animal Sciences University, Sylhet Agricultural University, Khulna Agricultural University and Patuakhali Science and Technology University. The admission test is held on each campus at the same time with the same questions.

=== Undergraduate program ===
- B.Sc. Agriculture(Hons.)
- B.Sc. Vet Science and Animal Husbandry
- Bachelor of Biomedical Science
- B.Sc. Fisheries(Hons.)
- B.Sc. Oceanography(Hons.)
- B.Sc. Agricultural Economics(Hons.)
- B.Sc. Agricultural Engineering
- B.Sc. Biocomputing Engineering
- B.Sc. Food Engineering
- B.Sc. Food Safety Management
- Bachelor of Environmental Science(Hons.)
- B.Sc. Disaster Management (Hons.)
