= Singair Upazila =

Singair সিঙ্গাইর
- Upazila
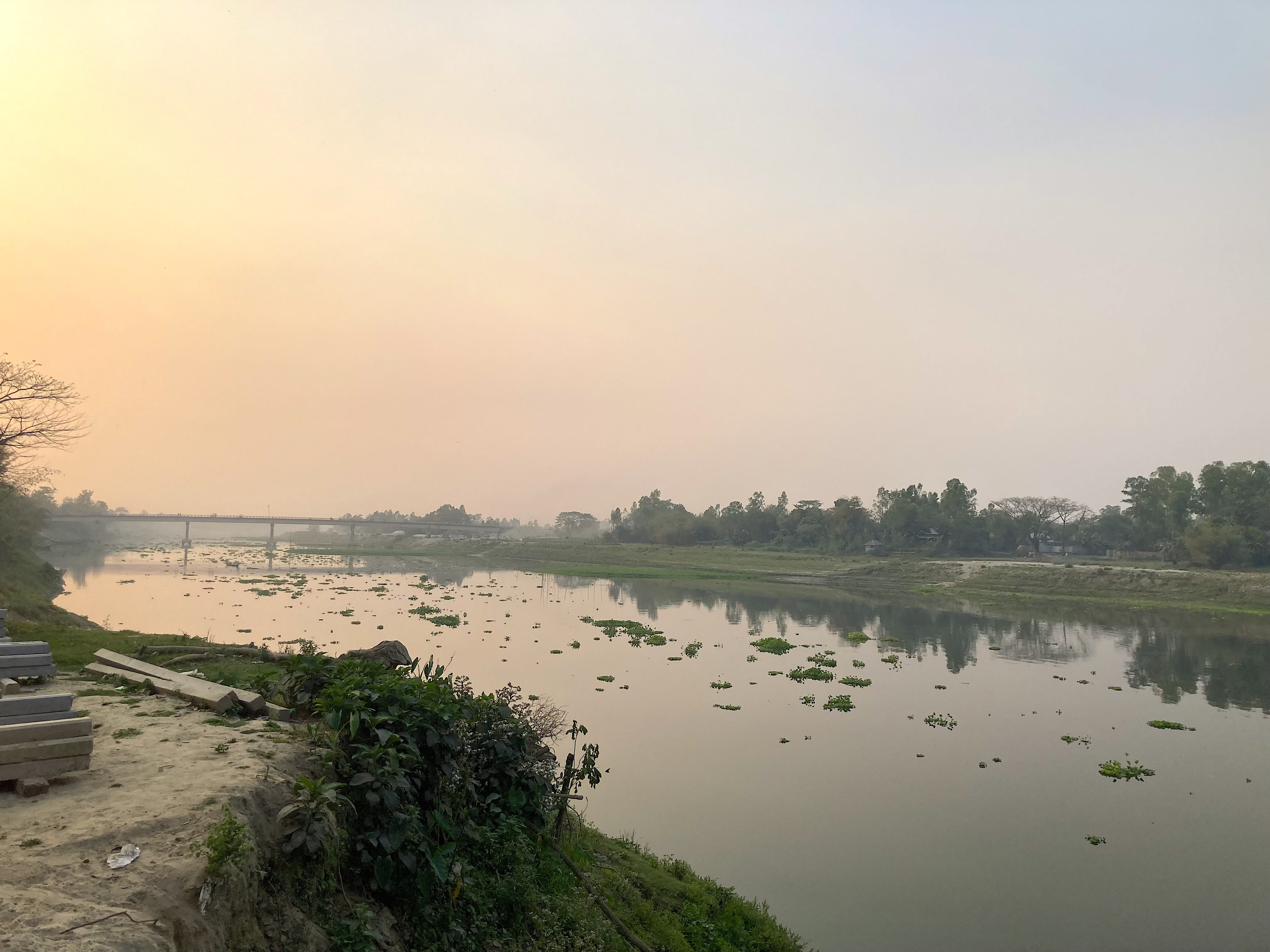
- Kaliganga River, Jamsha Union

- Coordinates: 23°48′55″N 90°08′03″E
- Country: Bangladesh
- Division: Dhaka
- District: Manikganj

Area
  - Total: 221.45 km^{2} (85.50 sq mi)

Population (2022)
  - Total: 328,125
  - Density: 1,481.7/km^{2} (3,837.6/sq mi)
- Time zone: UTC+6 (BST)
- Postal code: 1820
- Area code: 0651
- Website: Official Map of Singair

Singair Upazila mauza geocode map

Singair (Bengali: সিঙ্গাইর) is an upazila of Manikganj District in the Division of Dhaka, Bangladesh.

== Geography ==
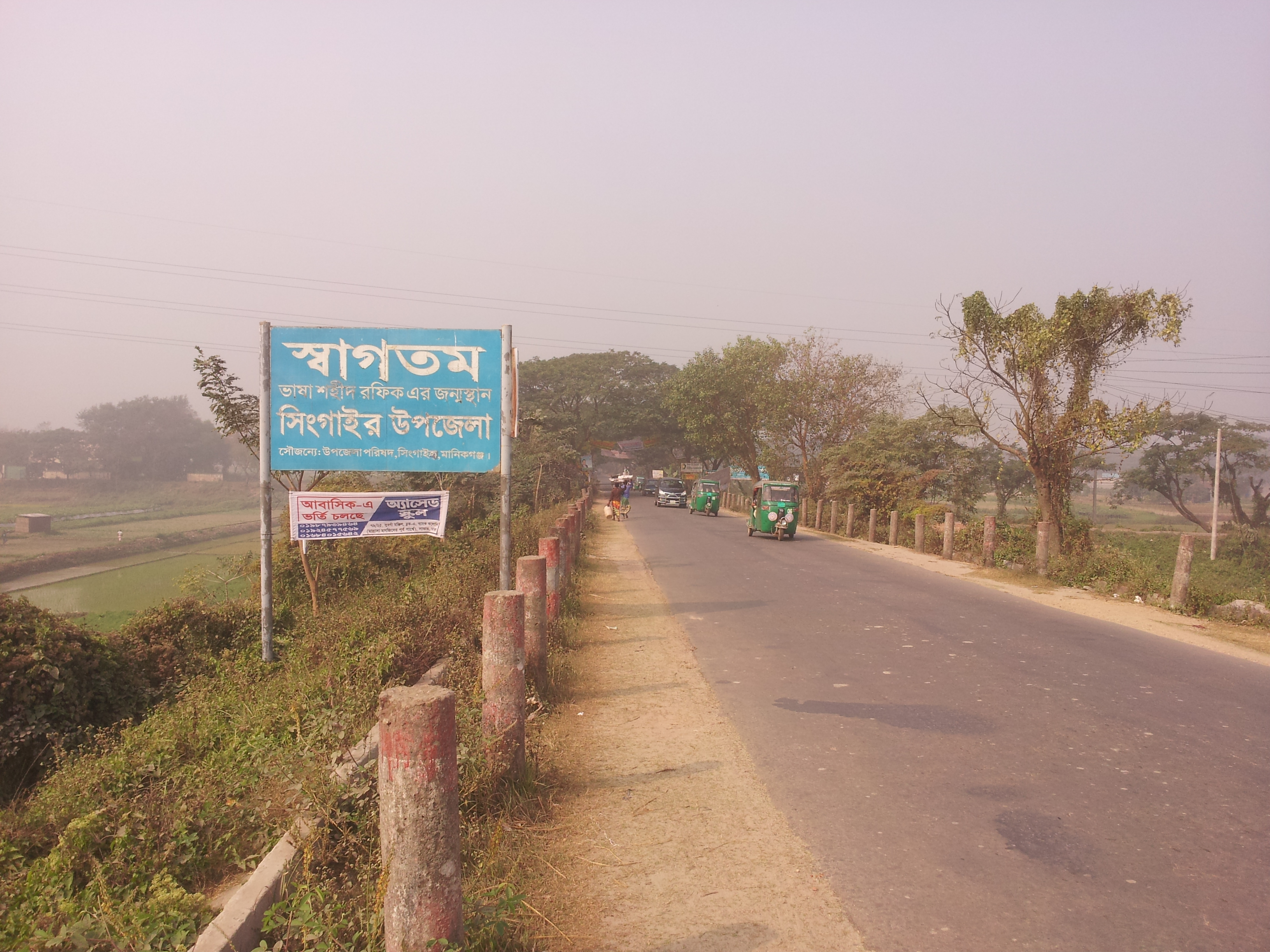
Savar- Singair Regional Highway

Singair is located at 23.8167°N 90.1500°E. It has 65,058 households and total area 221.45 km^{2}.

== Demographics ==
Religions in Singair Upazila (2022)
Religion	Percent
Islam	94.30%
Hinduism	5.70%

According to the 2022 Bangladeshi census, Singair Upazila had 83,582 households and a population of 328,125. 8.98% of the population were under 5 years of age. Singair had a literacy rate (age 7 and over) of 70.03%: 72.52% for males and 67.80% for females, and a sex ratio of 91.38 males for every 100 females. 49,229 (15.00%) lived in urban areas.

According to the 2011 Census of Bangladesh, Singair Upazila had 65,058 households and a population of 287,451. 62,790 (21.84%) were under 10 years of age. Singair had a literacy rate (age 7 and over) of 46.19%, compared to the national average of 51.8%, and a sex ratio of 1041 females per 1000 males. 26,885 (9.35%) lived in urban areas.

As of the 1991 Bangladesh census, Singair has a population of 461628. Males constitute 50.47% of the population, and females 49.53%. This Upazila's eighteen up population is 267789. Singair has an average literacy rate of 21.1% (7+ years), and the national average of 32.4% literate.

== Administration ==
Singair Upazila is divided into Singair Municipality and 11 union parishads: Jamsha, Charigram, Singair, Dhalla, Bayra, Chandhar, Baldahara, Joymontop, Jamirta, Saista, and Talibpur. The union parishads are subdivided into 137 mauzas and 241 villages.

Singair Municipality is subdivided into 9 wards and 14 mahallas.

== Education ==
There are three colleges in the upazila.

According to Banglapedia, Dakkhin Jamsha High School founded in 1969, Basiruddin Foundation High School (Jamsha Union), Baira High School (1949), Charigram S A Khan High School (1948), Golaidanga High School (1967), Jamirta SG Multilateral High School (1921), Talebpur Adarsho High School (1973), Joymontop High School (1929), Nabagram Multilateral High School (1921), Shahrail High School (1964), Singair Pilot High School (1940), and Singair Pilot Girl's High School are notable secondary schools.

== Notable people ==
- Noazesh Ahmed, plant geneticist and photographer, was born in the upazila in 1935.

== See also ==
- Upazilas of Bangladesh
- Districts of Bangladesh
- Divisions of Bangladesh
