= Bangladesh Agricultural University =

First agricultural university in Bangladesh

- বাংলাদেশ কৃষি বিশ্ববিদ্যালয়
- Logo of Bangladesh Agricultural University
- Other name: BAU
- Former name: East Pakistan Agricultural University
- Motto: জ্ঞান, দক্ষতা, চরিত্র
- Motto in English: Knowledge, Efficiency, Moral Character
- Type: Public agricultural university
- Established: 18 August 1961; 65 years ago
- Accreditation: Institution of Engineers, Bangladesh; University Grants Commission
- Chancellor: President Mirza Fakhrul Islam Alamgir
- Vice-Chancellor: Dr. Md. Rafiqul Islam Sarder
- Academic staff: 567
- Students: 8088
- Undergraduates: 5147
- Postgraduates: 2941
- Location: Mymensingh, Mymensingh District, 2202, Bangladesh; 24.7240°N 90.4374°E
- Campus: Urban, 1,200 acres (4.9 km^{2})
- Language: English
- Website: bau.edu.bd

University rankings

Global – Overall
- QS World: 1401+ (2027)
- THE World: 1001-1200 (2026)

Global – Life sciences and medicine
- THE Life Sciences: 601-800 (2026)

Regional – Overall
- QS Asia: 378 (2026)

Bangladesh Agricultural University (BAU) is a public agricultural university in Mymensingh, Bangladesh. It was founded in 1961 by the Pakistani government as East Pakistan Agricultural University. It is the third-oldest university in the country.

Its campus covers 1,200 acres (490 ha) on the west bank of the Old Brahmaputra River. Its academic activities take place under six faculties, which are subdivided into 45 departments. More than 90% of its funding comes from the national government.

As of 2024, BAU has over 5,000 undergraduate and nearly 3,000 post-graduate students. Alumni include academics, government officials, politicians, and recipients of the Ekushey Padak.

== History ==
=== Pakistan period ===
The Pakistani government set up the Commission on National Education at the end of 1958 to propose how to reorganise the country's education system. One recommendation in the commission's 1959 report was to set up an agricultural university in East Pakistan. There was already the East Pakistan College of Veterinary Science and Animal Husbandry in Mymensingh. The government chose to upgrade the college to East Pakistan Agricultural University. On 18 August 1961, the government did so by promulgating the East Pakistan Agricultural University Ordinance, 1961. Soil scientist M Osman Ghani was appointed the university's first vice-chancellor on 2 September 1961.

The university started with 30 teachers and 444 students. There were 23 departments under 2 faculties, the Faculty of Agriculture and the Faculty of Veterinary Science. The Faculty of Animal Husbandry was added in 1962.

In February 1963, Ghani left to become vice-chancellor of the University of Dacca. S.D. Chaudhuri took over from him at the agricultural university. The Faculty of Agricultural Economics and Rural Sociology was added in 1963. It was followed by the Faculty of Agricultural Engineering and Technology in 1964. A sixth faculty was started in 1967, the Faculty of Fisheries.

American Architect Paul Rudolph was commissioned in 1965 to design a master plan that would remake the former college campus for the university. Construction of the major buildings that were part of this project would continue for a decade.

Students at the university were politically active in the 1969 East Pakistan mass uprising. They boycotted classes on 23 January in response to police firing on students in Dacca. In Mymensingh, on 24 January, two people were killed by police firing and 20 were wounded on the picket lines. Police and troops from the East Pakistan Rifles entered the campus on 29 January, searching the residential quarters for "miscreants". On 10 February, students marched in protest. In the face of unrelenting countrywide disturbances, on 21 February, President Ayub Khan announced that he would not seek reelection. The next day, the government dropped all charges against opposition leader Sheikh Mujibur Rahman and the others accused in the Agartala Conspiracy Case.

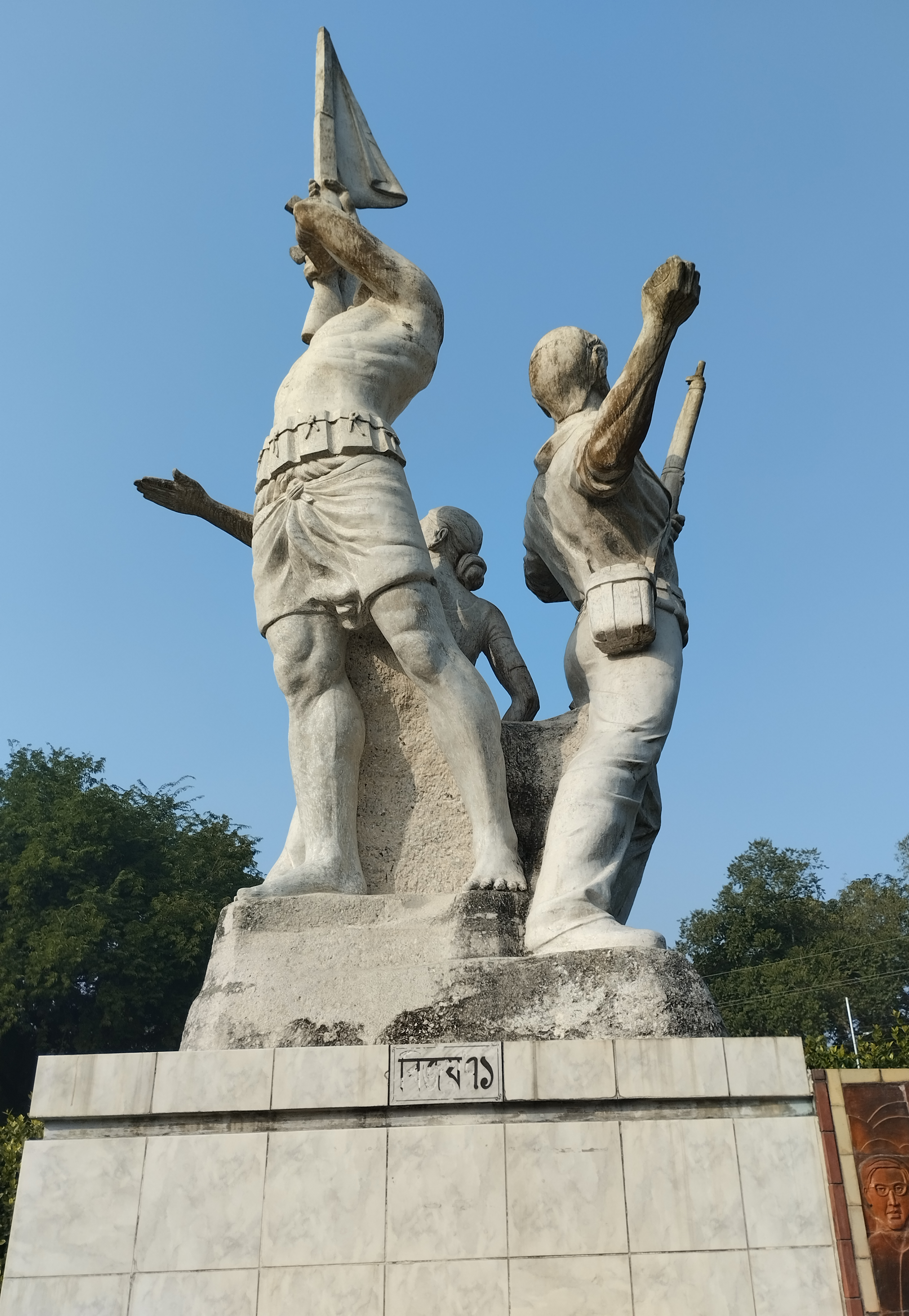
Bijoy '71

Biochemist Kamaluddin Ahmad became the vice-chancellor in 1969. Also that year, the central library, designed by Richard J. Neutra, opened.

Faculty, staff, and students of the university fought for independence during the 1971 Bangladesh Liberation War. One teacher, six employees, and eleven students died in the war.

=== After independence ===
In 1972, the university was renamed Bangladesh Agricultural University. When Bangladesh won its independence, there were only six universities in the country. BAU was the third-oldest and the only agricultural one.

The Agricultural Museum, the country's first, was established in 2007.

During the 2024 Bangladesh quota reform movement, students rallied, marched, and repeatedly blockaded the Dhaka-Mymensingh railway tracks for hours at a time.

== Campus ==
BAU's 1,200-acre (490 ha) campus is in Mymensingh, Bangladesh, 5 kilometres (3.1 mi) southeast of the city center. It is bounded on the east by the Old Brahmaputra River. The master campus plan and key buildings were designed by modernist architect Paul Rudolph.

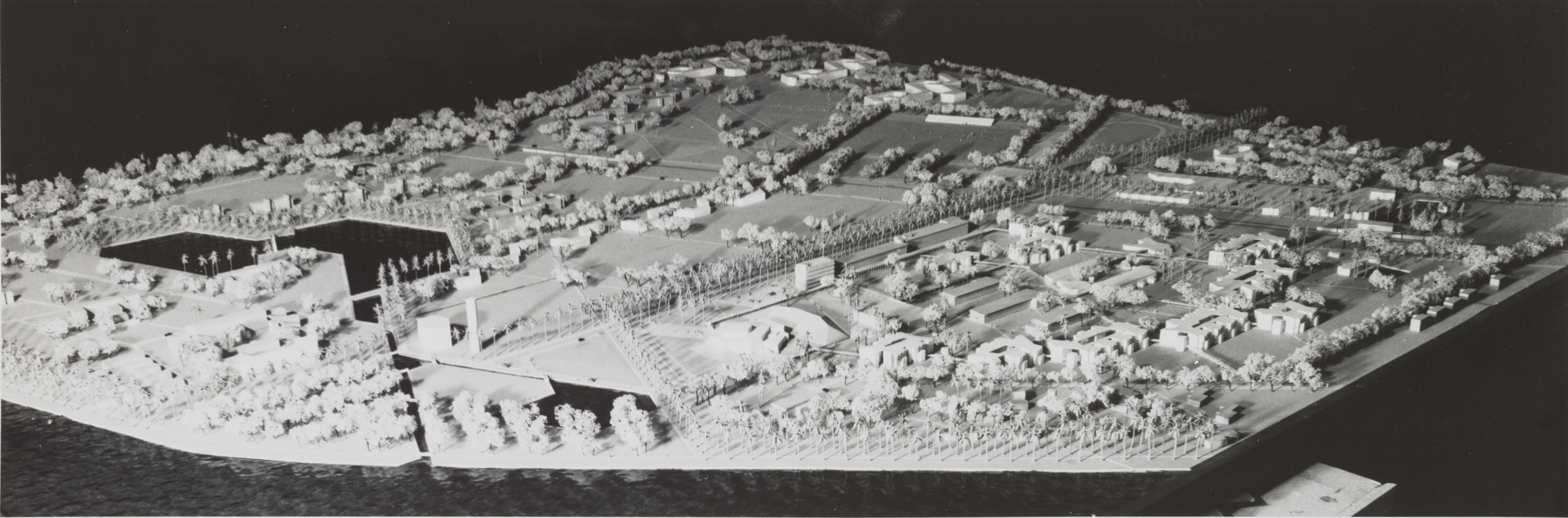
View looking southwest, with main academic buildings in the right foreground, of a model of the campus master plan by architect Paul Rudolph circa 1966

A palm-lined east–west avenue divides the main academic and administrative buildings to its north from mostly residential and recreational facilities to its south. At its east end is BAU's Shaheed Minar, memorializing those killed during the 1952 Bengali language movement. Nearby is a 2000 sculpture by Shaymol Chowdhury of three standing figures called Bijoy '71. It pays tribute to the sacrifices made during the Bangladesh Liberation War.

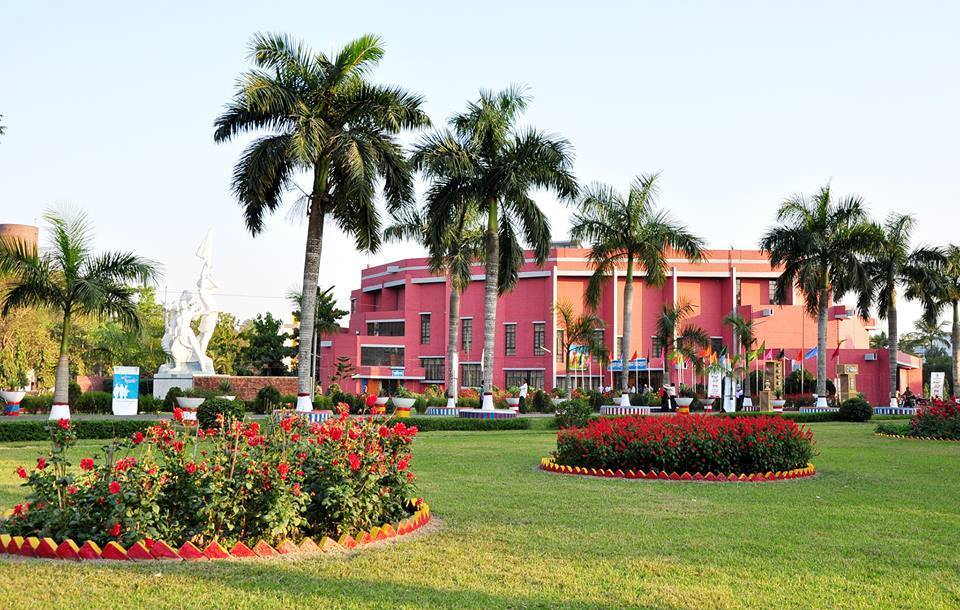
Auditorium with the Bijoy '71 sculpture on the left

Shilpacharya Zainul Abedin Auditorium has a capacity of nearly 2,000. It is used for cultural programmes. The Teacher Students Centre (TSC) is intended to be a focal point of student life and extra-curricular activities. It has dining facilities, newspaper reading rooms, and other common areas. It contains the offices of such student organisations as the debating, drama, and music societies.

The Botanical Garden is set on 25 acres (10 ha) on the bank of the Old Brahmaputra River. As of 2025, it contains 1,500 species, representing about 300 genera and 200 families. Its collection encompasses more than a fifth of the flora of Bangladesh, including 58 species that are threatened or near threatened. The garden is divided into 30 zones by plant type, and includes rock gardens, water gardens, and an orchid house. The Department of Crop Botany manages the garden. The university operates the Agriculture Museum. Opened in 2007, it is the first of its kind in the country and has a collection of approximately 500 agricultural implements. The Fish Museum & Biodiversity Centre was founded in 2009 by Stirling University in a building donated by BAU. It has a collection of riverine species from Bangladesh. BAU also operates ten major farms, including dairy and poultry ones.

In addition to the university's institutes and centres, the campus is home to two national research institutes: Bangladesh Institute of Nuclear Agriculture (BINA) and Bangladesh Fisheries Research Institute (BFRI).

=== Libraries ===
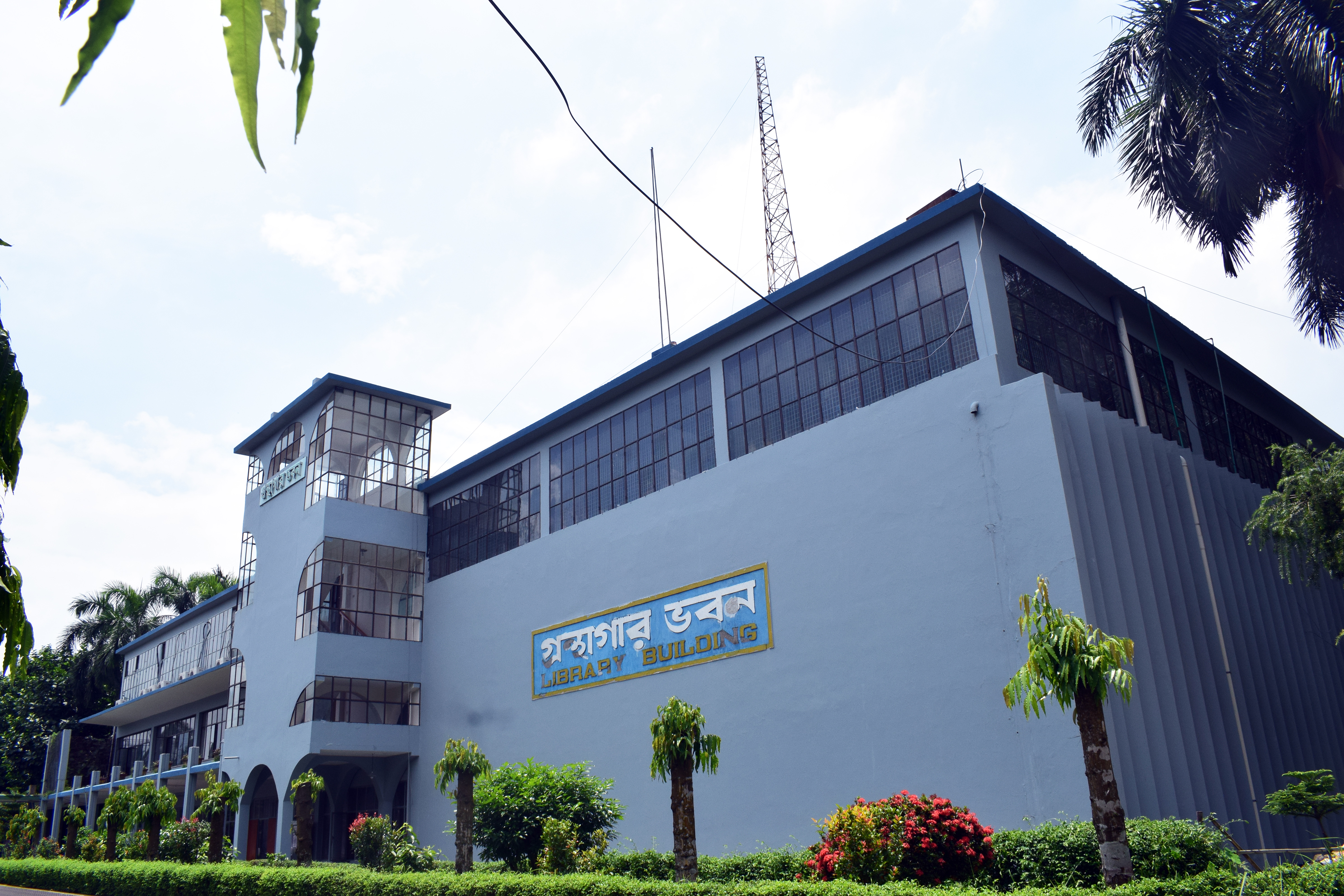
Library Building of BAU

The library was originally located in one room of the administration building. It contained just 5,000 volumes taken over from the East Pakistan College of Veterinary Science and Animal Husbandry. Since 1969, the central library has been housed in a purpose-built modernist building designed by architect Richard J. Neutra. Originally two-storied, in 2001 it underwent an expansion that added a third story, bringing its size to 66,000 square feet (6,100 m^{2}). As of 2025, the library holds 185,000 volumes and 2,000 periodicals, as well as dissertations, microforms, and audiovisual items. The Faculty of Agricultural Economics & Rural Sociology has its own library.

=== Halls of residence (student dormitories) ===
As of 2024, BAU has fourteen gender-segregated halls of residence. Nine are for men: Ashraful Haque Hall, Bangabandhu Sheikh Mujib Hall, Fazlul Haque Hall, Hossain Shaheed Suhrawardy Hall, Isha Khan Hall, Shaheed Nazmul Ahsan Hall, Shaheed Shamsul Haque Hall, Shaheed Jamal Hossain Hall, and Shahjalal Hall. Three of these are named after fighters for independence who were killed during the Bangladesh Liberation War and are termed shaheed (martyrs).

Five halls are for women: Begum Rokeya Hall, July 36 Hall, Krishi Kanya Hall, Sultana Razia Hall, and Taposhi Rabeya Hall. The two newest were previously named in honour of then-prime minister Sheikh Hasina and her late sister-in-law, Rosy Jamal. The latter was renamed Krishi Kanya Hall in January 2025. As of 2025, the former is shown on BAU's website as July 36 Hall, a reference to 5 August 2024, the day the Student–People's uprising forced Sheikh Hasina to resign.

There is also a dormitory for PhD students.

== Administration ==
The university is governed by the statutes put in place by the East Pakistan Agricultural University Ordinance, 1961, and subsequently amended by the governments of East Pakistan and Bangladesh. The President of Bangladesh or their designate is the chancellor of the university, and appoints the vice chancellor. The vice-chancellor is the chief executive officer of the university. In September 2024, A K Fazlul Haque Bhuiyan became the vice-chancellor.

Vice-chancellors
Name	Term	Position Number	Reference
M Osman Ghani	2 September 1961 – 1963	1st	
S.D. Chaudhuri	1963–1969	2nd	
Kamaluddin Ahmad	1969–1971	3rd	
Ashraful Haque			
Quazi Mohammad Fazlur Rahim	January 1971 – July 1971, January 1972 – November 1973		
Muhammad Amirul Islam	1971–1972		
Mosleh Uddin Ahmed Chowdhury	24 November 1973 – October 1980	6th	
AKM Aminul Haque	1980–1988		
Shah Mohammad Farouk	23 August 1993 - 13 November 1996		
Mohammad Hossain	14 November 1996 – 5 February 2000		
M Mustafizur Rahman	2001		
Muhammed Amirul Islam	2004		
M Musharraf Hossain Mian	2006	18th	
Md. Akhtar Hossain	2008	20th	
MA Sattar Mandal	15 November 2008 –	21st	
Rafiqul Haque	11 August 2011 – 8 April 2015	22nd	
Md. Ali Akbar	24 May 2015 –	23th	
Lutful Hassan	30 May 2019 –	24th	
Emdadul Haque Chowdhury	– 11 August 2024	25th	
A K Fazlul Haque Bhuiyan	19 September 2024 – present	26th	

=== Finances ===
The University Grants Commission (UGC) funds more than 90% of the university's recurring budget and all of its capital projects.

== Academics ==
BAU's academic year runs from July to June. It operates on a semester system. It offers bachelor's, master's, and doctoral degrees. The university is accredited by the UGC.

=== Faculties and departments ===
The university has 45 departments organised into six faculties: agriculture, agricultural economics and rural sociology, agricultural engineering and technology, animal husbandry, fisheries, and veterinary science. It also has four institutes.

The Faculty of Agriculture is one of the two original faculties of the university. It consists of 17 departments:

- Department of Agricultural Chemistry
- Department of Agricultural Extension Education
- Department of Agroforestry
- Department of Agrometeorology
- Department of Agronomy
- Department of Biochemistry and Molecular Biology
- Department of Biotechnology
- Department of Crop Botany
- Department of Entomology
- Department of Environmental Science
- Department of Genetics and Plant Breeding
- Department of Horticulture
- Department of Languages
- Department of Physics
- Department of Plant Pathology
- Department of Seed Science and Technology
- Department of Soil Science

The Faculty of Agricultural Economics and Rural Sociology was added in 1963. It consists of five departments:

- Department of Agribusiness and Marketing
- Department of Agricultural Economics
- Department of Agricultural Finance and Banking
- Department of Agricultural and Applied Statistics
- Department of Rural Sociology

The Faculty of Agricultural Engineering and Technology was added in 1964. It consists of five departments:

- Department of Computer Science and Mathematics
- Department of Farm Power and Machinery
- Department of Farm Structure and Environmental Engineering
- Department of Food Technology and Rural Industries
- Department of Irrigation and Water Management

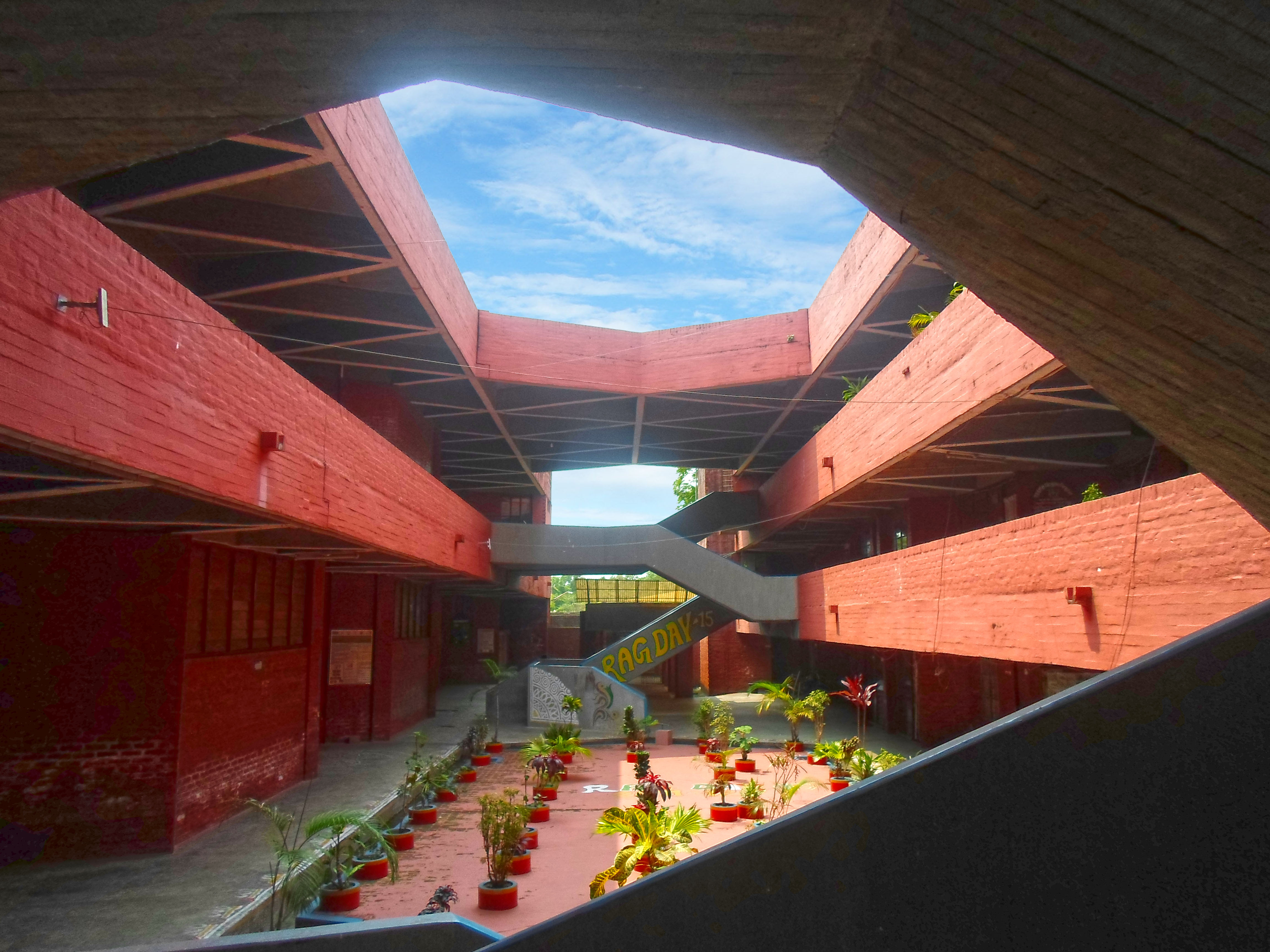
Courtyard of Faculty of Animal Husbandry

The Faculty of Animal Husbandry was added in 1962. It consists of five departments:

- Department of Animal Breeding and Genetics
- Department of Animal Nutrition
- Department of Animal Science
- Department of Dairy Science
- Department of Poultry Science

The Faculty of Fisheries, started in 1967, is the newest faculty of the university. It consists of five departments:

- Department of Aquaculture
- Department of Fisheries Biology and Genetics
- Department of Fisheries Management
- Department of Fisheries Technology
- Department of Marine Fisheries Science

The Faculty of Veterinary Science is one of the two original faculties of the university. It consists of eight departments:

- Department of Anatomy and Histology
- Department of Medicine
- Department of Microbiology and Hygiene
- Department of Parasitology
- Department of Pathology
- Department of Pharmacology
- Department of Physiology
- Department of Surgery and Obstetrics

==== Institutes ====
The university runs four institutes: Graduate Training Institute (GTI), Institute of Agribusiness and Developmental Studies (IADS); Interdisciplinary Institute for Food Security (IIFS); and Char and Haor Development institute.

=== Reputation and rankings ===
The 2024 U.S. News & World Report Best Global University Ranking placed BAU 5th among 5 in Bangladesh and tied for 1775th in the world. The July 2024 Webometrics Ranking of World Universities placed BAU 9th out of 170 in Bangladesh and 2323rd in the world. BAU was ranked 1001–1200 globally in the 2025 Times Higher Education World University Rankings.

== Admissions and costs ==
Admission requires a Higher Secondary Certificate (HSC) or foreign equivalent and an entrance exam.

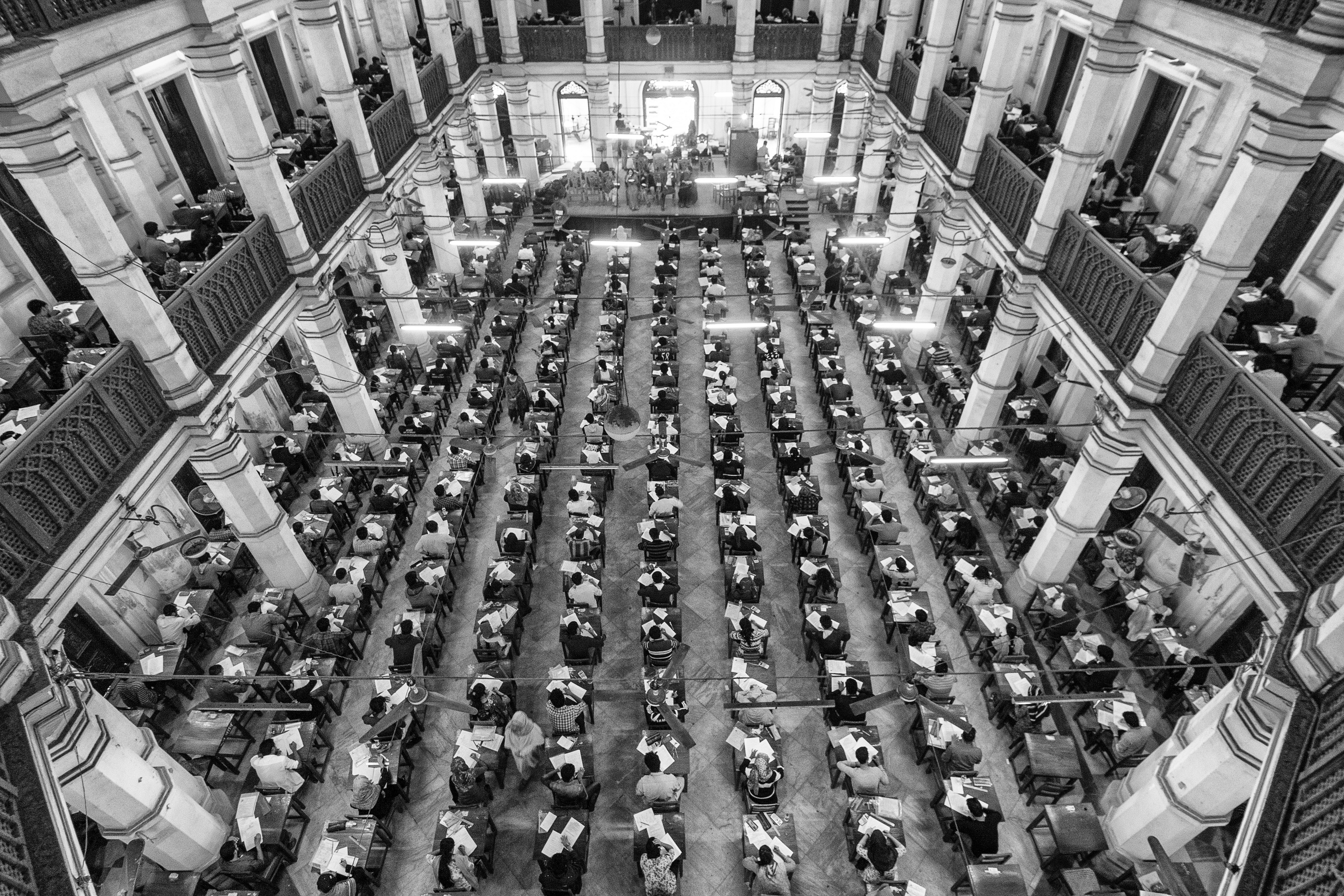
Dhaka University, one of the cluster exam centers in 2024

Starting in 2019, all public agricultural universities adopted a cluster system for undergraduate admissions. Under the system, an annual integrated entry exam takes place simultaneously at multiple locations around the country. In October 2024, 51,836 candidates sat the exam for 3,718 available seats. Of those, 1,116 seats were at BAU, with the remainder spread among the other public universities offering agricultural degrees. After the exam, BAU's academic council decided to pull the university out of the cluster admissions system. At the request of the Ministry of Education, the university agreed to continue with the cluster system for the 2024–2025 academic year to avoid confusion and disruption.

BAU charges admission and residential hall fees, plus variable fees for each semester. There are different fees at the undergraduate and graduate levels, and different ones for international students.

== Publications ==
The Journal of the Bangladesh Agricultural University is published on behalf of the Bangladesh Agricultural University Research System. It is a peer-reviewed, open access journal, published quarterly. It accepts original research articles and review articles on all fields of agricultural science. The first volume was published in 2003.

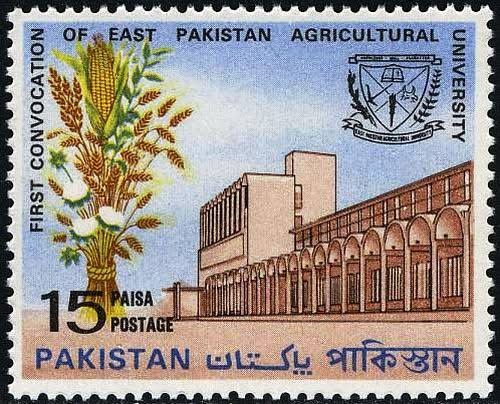
Postage stamp of Pakistan issued on the occasion of the first convocation of the university

== Notable people ==
=== Faculty ===
- Humayun Ahmed, author
- A. K. M. Saidul Haque Chowdhury, agriculturist, vice chancellor of Noakhali University of Science and Technology
- TIM Fazle Rabbi Chowdhury, MP for Gaibandha-3 (1986–1996), (1996–2013)
- Abdul Karim, soil scientist
- Shamsuzzaman Khan, folklorist
- Abdur Rahim, horticultural scientist, Independence Award recipient

=== Alumni ===
- M. Golam Shahi Alam, veterinarian and university administrator
- Shamsul Alam, economist, former state minister of planning
- Md. Shahidur Rashid Bhuiyan, plant geneticist and university administrator
- Goutam Buddha Das, animal nutritionist and university administrator
- Sajjadul Hassan, MP for Netrokona-4 (2023–2024)
- M. Afzal Hossain, biochemist and university administrator
- Aolad Hossain, MP for Dhaka-4 (2024)
- Md Mokbul Hossain (secretary), secretary, Ministry of Information and Broadcasting
- Md. Matiar Rahman Howlader, veterinarian and university administrator
- Md. Tofazzal Islam, biotechnologist
- Jahangir Alam Khan, agricultural economist, Ekushey Padak recipient
- Nazmul Karim Khan, police officer
- Md. Giashuddin Miah, agronomist and university administrator
- M. Azizur Rahman, economist and university administrator
- Mohammad Abdur Razzaque, minister of agriculture (2019–2024)
- Shawkat Momen Shahjahan, MP for Tangail-8 (1986–1988, 1999–2001, and 2008–2014)
- Shahanaz Sultana, plant geneticist, Ekushey Padak recipient
