= Tofazzal Islam =

Bangladeshi biotechnologist, ecological chemist, educator, and author (born 1966)

Md. Tofazzal Islam
- মোঃ তোফাজ্জল ইসলাম
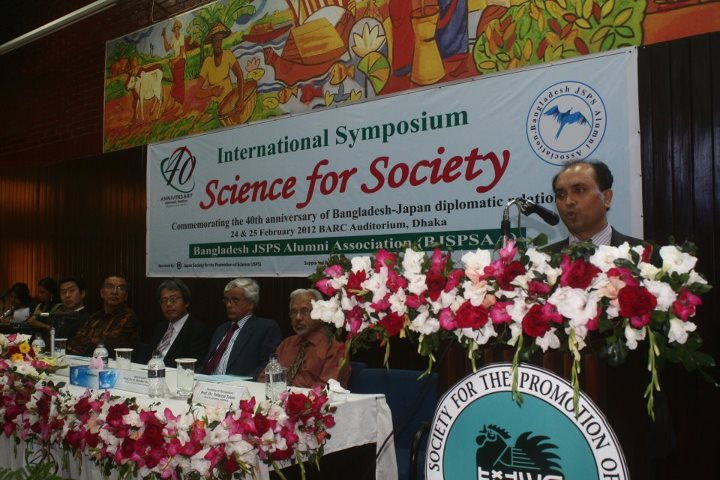
- Islam in Dhaka (Feb 2012)
- Born: December 20, 1966 (age 59); Shashai village, Brahmanbaria District, East Pakistan
- Education: Hokkaido University
- Occupation: Professor
- Years active: 1994–present (as of 2026)

Md. Tofazzal Islam (born December 20, 1966) is a biotechnologist, ecological chemist, educator, and author from Bangladesh. He is now a Professor and founding Director of the Institute of Biotechnology and Genetic Engineering (IBGE) of Gazipur Agricultural University (GAU) in Bangladesh. He joined Bangladesh Open University (BOU) as a lecturer in 1994 and became an assistant, associate and full professor in 1997, 2004 and 2010, respectively. He joined GAU on July 1, 2010, as a professor and head of the Department of Biotechnology.

== Early life and education ==
Tofazzal was born on December 20, 1966, in the village of Shashai, located in the Brahmanbaria district of what was then East Pakistan and is now Bangladesh. His father, Md Bazlur Rahman, was a farmer, while his mother, Khaleda Khanom, managed the household. His early education was disrupted by the brutalities of the Pakistani army during the liberation war of Bangladesh in 1971. Consequently, he commenced his primary education at the second-grade level in a newly established primary school in Shashai. As the eldest son, he assisted his parents in agricultural activities to support the family during his primary and secondary education years. Despite these challenges, he consistently excelled academically, never ranking lower than first place from grades 2 to 10. He completed his secondary school certificate (SSC) from Satbarga High School and his higher secondary certificate (HSC) from Brahmanbaria Government College, achieving First Division in both examinations.

Tofazzal earned his B.Sc. Ag (Honors) and M.Sc. (Ag) degrees from Bangladesh Agricultural University (BAU), securing First Position in the First Class on both occasions based on merit. He furthered his studies in Japan as a Japanese government scholar, completing his MS (1999) and PhD (2002) degrees at Hokkaido University with distinction under the guidance of Professor Satoshi Tahara, specializing in chemical ecology and natural products chemistry. Dr Tofazzal undertook a post-doctoral position as an Alexander von Humboldt fellow (2007–2009) at the University of Göttingen, Germany, specializing in molecular cross-talks between grapevine and downy mildew pathogen Plasmopara viticola under Andreas von Tiedemann's guidance. He was honored with the Commonwealth Academic Staff Fellowship (March to May 2013) to collaborate with Prof. Michele L. Clarke at the University of Nottingham, UK. During his career, he also collaborated with Prof. Satoshi Tahara of Hokkaido University and Prof. Shinya Oba of Gifu University, Japan, as a JSPS Postdoctoral fellow (2003–2005) and JSPS Invitation Fellow (June–July 2015), respectively. His achievements include being awarded the prestigious US Fulbright Visiting Fellowship (September 2017 to June 2018), during which he worked on developing a molecular tool for diagnosing anthracnose diseases in asymptomatic strawberry plants alongside Prof. Daniel Panaccione and Professor Mahfuzur Rahman at West Virginia University. Tofazzal also contributed as an international consultant across various organizations, including the Secretariat of the Pacific Community (SPC) spanning 22 Pacific Countries & Territories. Dr Tofazzal assumed the role of visiting professor at the Institute of Plant Protection of the Chinese Academy of Agricultural Sciences in China from 2021 to 2023. Additionally, he played a pivotal role in establishing the Asian Wheat Blast Research Center at Kobe University with Prof. Yukio Tosa while serving as a visiting professor from 2023 to 2024.

== Personal life ==
Tofazzal married Hasna Hena Begum in 1995. Hasna Hena currently holds the position of Senior Specialist (Soil and Environment) at Waste Concern, Bangladesh. The couple has one son, Tahsin Islam Sakif, born on July 2, 1997, who currently works as an IT specialist in the USA. Hasna Hena completed her Ph.D. in plant physiology at Hokkaido University in 2003.

== Research accomplishments ==
Since 1997, Tofazzal has been dedicated to researching the ecological chemistry of Peronosporomycete phytopathogens and applied phytochemistry. His MS and PhD theses focused on understanding the cell biology of flagellar motility, taxis, viability, and differentiation of zoospores of oomycete phytopathogens, particularly their interactions with host and non-host plant secondary metabolites. He successfully elucidated the mechanisms underlying damping-off disease control in spinach and sugar beet through the action of Lysobacter sp. SB-K88. In recognition of his expertise, he was awarded a fellowship from the Japan Society for the Promotion of Science (JSPS) from 2003 to 2005. During this fellowship, he investigated signaling systems between root and rhizoplane microorganisms, including oomycetes, and explored their potential agricultural applications at the laboratory of Hokkaido University.

Tofazzal has made significant contributions to academia, with over 350 research articles published in national and international peer-reviewed journals and book series, alongside more than 250 articles in national dailies and periodicals. His scholarly output also includes the authorship of twenty books. His groundbreaking research has been featured in esteemed international publications such as Nature Communications, Molecular Plant, Trends in Biotechnology, BMC Biology, PLOS Biology, Trends in Genetics, Briefings in Bioinformatics, Molecular Plant-Microbe Interactions, Applied and Environmental Microbiology, Cell Motility and the Cytoskeleton, Journal of Agricultural and Food Chemistry, Phytochemistry, Phytopathology, Plant and Soil, Biological Control, Frontiers in Microbiology, Scientific Reports, Marine Drugs, Organic Letters, Rice Science, Journal of Natural Products, Plant Disease, Plant Biotechnology Journal, Engineering, Animal Microbiome, Frontiers in Immunology, Journal of Microbiology and Biotechnology, the Journal of Antibiotics, and Environmental Pollution, among others. He is one of the pioneer researchers in open and distance learning (ODL) in Bangladesh. As the founding teacher, he significantly contributed to the establishment of School of Agriculture and Rural Development at Bangladesh Open University. His research book titled "Information and Communication Technology in Education" published by Paragon Enterprises Ltd. in Bangla language has been well accepted by readers and elites. He co-edited a book Effectively Implementing Information Communication Technology in Higher Education in the Asia-Pacific Region with Jim Peterson, Okhwa Lee, and Matthew Piscioneri.

Tofazzal worked as an Alexander von Humboldt fellow (2007–2009) at Georg-August-Universität Göttingen, Germany with Andreas von Tiedemann in the Division of Plant Pathology and Plant Protection.[3] His research interests are concentrated in understanding the underlying molecular mechanism of asexual sporulation in peronosporomycetes and signal transduction pathways of chemotaxis and differentiation of zoospores. He engaged and led 31 researchers from 4 continents to rapidly determine the origin of the first epidemic outbreak of wheat blast in Bangladesh in 2016 using field pathogenomics, open data sharing and open science. Since then he has been leading a large group of national and international researchers for the mitigation of worrisome wheat blast disease caused by Magnaporthe oryzae Trticum using genomics, genome editing, nanobiotechnology and other advanced molecular approaches. His team developed a point-of-care diagnostic method for rapid detection of wheat blast fungus in collaboration with researchers in China, USA and KSA using genome-specific primers and CRISPR-Cas12a technology. In collaboration with researchers at GIFS and NRC, his team recent decoded the whole genome of a year-round fruiting jackfruit. Over the years, Prof. Tofazzal discovered a large number (>50) of novel bioactive secondary metabolites from marine and terrestrial organisms, and elucidated the mode of actions of some of these natural products on fungi and oomycete phytopathogens. Prof. Tofazzal collaborating with Prof. Yusuke Yamauchi and Shahriar Hossain of University of Queensland in Australia to utilize nanotechnology for production of high valued products from jute fiber, development of nanopesticide and preparation of agriculturally and environmentally valuable mesoporous nanomaterials. He secured more 2 million dollars of funding from Bill & Melinda Gates Foundation, FCDO, World Bank, USDA, British Council (UK), BBSRC, Bangladesh Academy Science – USDA, University Grants Commission of Bangladesh etc. and established the laboratories with state-of-art facilities for research in the field of biotechnology and genetic engineering at his established IBGE.

Prof. Tofazzal is the Editor-in-Chief of two series books, Bacilli and Agrobiotechnology, and CRISPR-Cas Methods that publish by Springer Nature. He serves as an Editor of Physiologia Plantarum, Academic Editor of PLOS ONE, Editor of Scientific Reports, Associate Editor of Frontiers in Microbiology and Member of Editorial Advisory Board of CABI Reviews. Prof. Islam is an elected Fellow of Bangladesh Academy of Sciences (FBAS), American Phytopathological Society (FAPS), Bangladesh Academy of Agriculture (FBAA) and The World Academy of Sciences (FTWAS). He received many awards and medals including a Gold Medal of Bangladesh Academy of Sciences, UGC Research Award, Commonwealth Innovation Award, Islamic Development Bank Innovation Award, and the GNOBB Gold Medal Award.

== Area of specialization and research interests ==
- Genomics and genome editing
- Wheat blast disease
- Molecular Plant-Microbe Interaction
- Ecological Chemistry and Bioactive Natural Products
- Plant Probiotics

== Administrative, academic and other position (leadership) ==
- Fellow, American Phytopathology, USA
- Fellow, The World Academy of Sciences (TWAS)
- Elected Fellow, Bangladesh Academy of Sciences (BAS), Bangladesh
- Syndicate Member, Jamalpur Science and Technology University
- Founding Director, Institute of Biotechnology and Genetic Engineering (IBGE), BSMRAU from April 2019 to date.
- Director (International Affairs), Gazipur Agricultural University, Bangladesh from July 2017 to November 2017.
- Elected President, GAU Teachers Association (2019–2021)
- Fellow, Bangladesh Academy of Sciences, the apex body of the eminent scientists and technologists of Bangladesh.
- Founder Director, Institute of Biotechnology and Genetic Engineering (IBGE), GAU from 15 April 2019 to date.
- Member, Board of Governors, Bangladesh Open University (BOU), 1997–98.
- Member, Academic Council, BOU, HSTU and GAU.
- Dean (in charge), School of Agriculture and Rural Development, BOU in 1996.
- Vice-president (elected), Shaheed Nazmul Ahsan Hall Sangsad (1991–92), BAU.
- General Secretary, Executive Committee of Bangladesh Open University Teachers Association (BOUTA), 1995–96.
- Member, Bangladesh Federation of University Teachers Association in 1995–96.
- Member, Executive Committee of BOUTA in 1996–97, 2002–03, 2010–11.
- Head (July 2010 to July 2012), Department of Biotechnology, GAU, Gazipur, Bangladesh.
- Member (July 2010 to date), Academic Council, GAU, Gazipur, Bangladesh.
- Member (July 2010 to date), Academic Council, Hajee Mohammad Danesh Science & Technology University, Bangladesh.
- Member (October 2010 to date), Executive Committee, School of Life Science, Shahjalal University of Science and Technology, Sylhet, Bangladesh.
- Director (July 2012 to March 2013), Outreach Program, Gazipur Agricultural University (GAU), Gazipur, Bangladesh
- Syndicate Member, Sylhet Agricultural University (SAU), Sylhet, Bangladesh

== Award and prizes ==
- Commonwealth Innovation Award, Commonwealth Secretariat, UK in 2019
- Islamic Development Bank Transformers Roadshow Competition Prize 2018
- Fulbright Visiting Scholar Fellowship from 2017 to 2018 in USA
- Vocational Excellence Award 2017 for Outstanding Contribution to Science and Technology from the Rotary Club of Uttara (RI Dist 3281), Bangladesh.
- Abdul Mannan Memorial Award 2017 from the Hafiza Khatun Memorial Trust.
- The "Genius Award 2016" from the Bangladesh Education Observation Society, Bangladesh.
- Food and Agriculture Award 2011 from CSRL (campaign for sustainable livelihoods), Oxfam and GROW for outstanding contribution to agriculture.
- University Grants Commission (UGC) Award 2008 for the second time (award received in May 2011) for outstanding fundamental research discoveries in Agricultural Sciences.
- Georg Forster Research Award and Fellowship from the Alexander von Humboldt Foundation, Germany (2007–2009)
- UGC Research Award 2004 from the University Grants Commission (UGC), Dhaka, Bangladesh for fundamental research accomplishments in agricultural science.
- Japan Society for Bioscience, Biotechnology, and Agrochemistry (JSBBA) Best Young Scientist Award 2003 for significant research discovery in Ecochemical Interactions between Plants and Phytopathogenic Peronosporomycetes.
- JSPS Foreign Researcher Fellowship for Postdoctoral Research at Hokkaido University from April 2003 to March 2005
- Monbukagakusho Scholarship for MS and Ph D Study at Hokkaido University (1997–2002).
- Gold Medal from the Honorable President of Bangladesh and the Chancellor of BAU Prof. Iazuddin Ahmed for securing first position in M.Sc. (Ag.) among all students in all the department of the Faculty of Agriculture with more than 75% marks in 1989 (held in 1995).
- BAU Chancellor's Prize from the Honorable Prime Minister Begum Khaleda Zia for securing First Position in the First Class in B.Sc. Ag. (Hons.) in 1988 (held in 1991).
- Prof. Karim Memorial Award in 1992.
- University Grants Commission Merit Scholarship in 1990.
- Commonwealth Academic Fellowship of UK in 2012
- Bangladesh Academy of Sciences Gold Medal 2011

== Live interview ==
- https://www.youtube.com/watch?v=zt3EaaP1kLk&fb_action_ids=10202883147300821&fb_action_types=yt-fb-app%3Aupload&fb_source=other_multiline&action_object_map
- https://www.youtube.com/watch?v=W6Qt_Srw7MA&fb_action_ids=10202882145315772&fb_action_types=yt-fb-app%3Aupload_ne
- https://www.youtube.com/watch?v=nLXBM6QyKz0&fb_action_ids=10202884699859634&fb_action_types=yt-fb-app%3Aupload_ne

== Selected works ==
Islam published more than 350 research papers in national and international peer-reviewed journals and books series, more than 150 articles in national dailies and periodicals, seven books. Most of his fundamental research contributions have been published in some world-leading international journals and reviews such as -Nature Communications, Scientific Reports, BMC Biology, ACS Sustainable Chemistry and Engineering, PLOS ONE, Journal of Materials Chemistry A, Journal of Natural Products Chemistry, Molecular Plant-Microbe Interactions, Applied and Environmental Microbiology, Cell Motility and the Cytoskeleton, Journal of Agricultural and Food Chemistry, Phytochemistry, Phytopathology, Plant and Soil, Biological Control, European Journal of Plant Pathology, Bioscience, Biotechnology, and Biochemistry, Journal of Pesticide Science, Journal of Basic Microbiology, World Journal of Microbiology and Biotechnology, The Journal of Antibiotics, Journal of General Plant Pathology, Journal of Basic Microbiology and so on.

1. Plant probiotic bacteria Bacillus and Paraburkholderia improve growth, yield and content of antioxidants in strawberry fruit. Mosaddiqur Rahman, Abdullah As Sabir, Julakha Akter Mukta, Md. Mohibul Alam Khan, Mohammad Mohi-Ud-Di, Md. Gishuddin Miah, Mahfuzur Rahman, Md Tofazza Islam. Scientific Reports (2018) 8:2504.

2. Application of CRISPR/Cas9 Genome Editing Technology for the Improvement of Crops Cultivated in Tropical Climates: Recent Progress, Prospects, and Challenges. Haque E, Taniguchi H, Hassan MM, Bhowmik P, Karim MR, Smiech M, Zhao K, Rahman M and Islam T (2018) Front. Plant Sci. (2018) 9:617.

3. Enhancement of Growth and Grain Yield of Rice in Nutrient Deficient Soils by Rice Probiotic Bacteria. Khan MMA, Haque E, Paul NC, Khaleque MA, Al-Garni SMS, Islam MT. Rice Science (2017) 24(5): 264–273.

4. Mesoporous metallic rhodium nanoparticles. Bo Jiang, Cuiling Li, Omer Dag, Hideki Abe, Toshiaki Takei, Tsubasa Imai, Md. Shahriar A. Hossain, Md. Tofazzal Islam, Kathleen Wood, Joel Henzie & Yusuke Yamauchi. Nature Communications (2017) 8:15581.

5. Molecular Identification of Multiple Antibiotic Resistant Fish Pathogenic Enterococcus faecalis and their Control by Medicinal Herbs. Muntasir Rahman, Md. Mahbubur Rahman, Suzan Chandra Deb, Md. Shahanoor Alam, Md. Jahangir Alam & Md. Tofazzal Islam. Scientific Reports (2017) 7, Article number: 3747.

6. Bacilli and Agrobiotechnology. Islam MT, Rahman M, Piyush P and Aeron A. (2017) An edited series book published by Springer International Publishing, ISBN 978-3-319-44408-6 (Print) 978-3-319-44409-3 (Online). pp. 416.

7. Emergence of wheat blast in Bangladesh was caused by a South American lineage of Magnaporthe oryzae. M. Tofazzal Islam, Daniel Croll, Pierre Gladieux, Darren M. Soanes, Antoine Persoons, Pallab Bhattacharjee, Md. Shaid Hossain, Dipali Rani Gupta, Md. Mahbubur Rahman, M. Golam Mahboob, Nicola Cook, Moin U. Salam, Musrat Zahan Surovy, Vanessa Bueno Sancho, João Leodato Nunes Maciel, Antonio NhaniJúnior, Vanina Lilián Castroagudín, Juliana T. de Assis Reges, Paulo Cezar Ceresini, Sebastien Ravel, Ronny Kellner, Elisabeth Fournier, Didier Tharreau, Marc-Henri Lebrun, Bruce A. McDonald, Timothy Stitt, Daniel Swan, Nicholas J. Talbot, Diane G. O. Saunders, Joe Win and Sophien Kamoun. BMC Biology (2016) 14:84

8. Inhibitory effects of macrotetrolides from Streptomyces spp. on zoosporogenesis and motility of peronosporomycete zoospores are likely linked with enhanced ATPase activity in mitochondria. Islam MT et al. 2016. Frontiers in Microbiology 7: 1824.

9. Protein kinase C is likely to be involved in zoosporogenesis and maintenance of flagellar motility in the Peronosporomycete zoospores. M. T. Islam, A. von Tiedemann, H. Laatsch. Molecular Plant-Microbe Interactions (2011) 24: 938–947.

10. Dynamic rearrangement of F-actin organization triggered by host-specific plant signal is linked to morphogenesis of Aphanomyces cochlioides zoospores. M. T. Islam. Cell Mot. Cytoskel. (2008) 65: 553–562.

11. Disruption of ultrastructure and cytoskeletal network is involved with biocontrol of damping-off pathogen Aphanomyces cochlioides by Lysobacter sp. strain SB-K88. M. T. Islam (2008) Biol. Contr. 46: 312–321.

12. Suppression of damping-off disease in host plants by the rhizoplane bacterium Lysobacter sp. strain SB-K88 is linked to plant colonization and antibiosis against soilborne Peronosporomycetes. M. T. Islam, Y. Hashidoko, A. Deora, T. Ito, S. Tahara (2005) Appl. Environ. Microbiol. 71: 3786–3796.

13. Host-specific plant signal and G-protein activator, mastoparan, triggers differentiation of zoospores of the phytopathogenic oomycete Aphanomyces cochlioides. M. T. Islam, T. Ito, S. Tahara. Plant Soil (2003) 255: 131–142.

14. Zoosporicidal activity of polyflavonoid tannin identified in Lannea coromandelica stem bark against phytopathogenic oomycete Aphanomyces cochlioides. M. T. Islam, T. Ito, M. Sakasai, S. Tahara. J. Agric. Food Chem. (2002) 50: 6697–6703.

15. Dihydroflavonols from Lannea coromandelica. M. T. Islam, S. Tahara. Phytochemistry (2000) 54: 901–907.

16. CRISPR-Cas Methods. Islam, M. Tofazzal, Bhowmik, Pankaj, Molla, Kutubuddin A. (Eds.). doi. 10.1007/978-1-0716-0616-2.

== Notable contributions ==
- Established an Asian Wheat Blast Research Center at Kobe University in Japan in 2023–2024.
- Established the Institute of Biotechnology and Genetic Engineering (IBGE) in 2019 at GAU with laboratories of state-of-art facilities for research in tissue culture, biotechnology and genetic engineering.
- Prepared a Project Proposal for the establishment of a Center for Pacific Animals, Crops and Trees (CePACT) at the South Pacific Community in Fiji as a Consultant.
- Secured approx. USD 10 million funds from national and international donors including World Bank, USDA, FAO/IAEA, Bill & Melinda Gates Foundation, FCDO (UK), GoB, and established laboratories with state-of-art facilities and developed a Dream Team in the IBGE of BSMRAU.
- Developed a rapid, convenient, specific and cost-effective molecular diagnostic method for detection of wheat blast fungus genome-specific primers and Cas12a-mediated technology.
- Discovered origin and genetic identity of the first emergence of devastating wheat blast disease in Bangladesh in 2016 using field pathogenomics and open data sharing approaches.
- Developed a formulation of plant probiotics for biological control of wheat blast diseases.
- Discovered more than 50 new bioactive natural products and elucidated their modes of action.
- Developed novel plant probiotic formulation that reduce 50% requirement of chemical fertilizers in rice.
- Developed a strong national and international collaboration to address emerging challenges in agriculture by cutting-edge research (e.g., genomics, genome editing etc.)

== Notable recent publications ==
- Biological control potential of worrisome wheat blast disease by the seed endophytic bacilli. MZ Surovy, S Dutta, NU Mahmud, DR Gupta, T Farhana, J Win, C Dunlap, M Rahman, AG Sharpe, T Islam* (2024). Frontiers in Microbiology 15: 1336515.
- Improvement of growth, yield and associated bacteriome of rice by the application of probiotic Paraburkholderia and Delftia. T Islam*, MN Hoque, DR Gupta, NU Mahmud, TI Sakif, AG Sharpe (2023). Frontiers in Microbiology 14: 1212505.
- CRISPR enables heritable genome editing in planta. T Islam*, SH Kasfy (2023). Trends in Genetics 39: 646–648.
- Horizontal gene transfer from plant to whitefly. T Islam*, RB Azad, SH Kasfy, AA Rahman, TZ Khan (2023). Trends in Biotechnology 41: 853–856.
- Daylight-driven rechargeable TiO2 nanocatalysts suppress wheat blast caused by Magnaporthe oryzae Triticum. Mahmud NU, Gupta DR, Paul SK, Chakraborty M, Mehebub MS, Surovy MZ, Rabby SMF, Rahat AAM, Roy PC, Sohrawardy H, Amin MA, Masud MK, Ide Y, Yamauchi Y, Hossain MS, Islam T (2022). Bulletin of the Chemical Society of Japan 95(8) 1263–1271.
- Whole-genome sequencing of a year-round fruiting jackfruit (Artocarpus heterophyllus Lam.) reveals high levels of single nucleotide variation. Islam T, Afroz N, Koh C, Hoque MN, Rahman MJ, Gupta DR, Mahmud NU, Nahid AA, Islam R, Bhowmik PK and Sharpe AG (2022). Frontiers in Plant Science 13:1044420.
- CRISPR-Cas Methods. Islam, M. Tofazzal, Molla, Kutubuddin A. (Eds.). doi. https://doi.org/10.1007/978-1-0716-1657-4.
- Rapid detection of wheat blast pathogen Magnaporthe Oryzae Triticum pathotype using genome-specific primers and Cas12a-mediated technology. Houxiang Kang, Ye Peng, Kangyu Hua, Yufei Deng, Maria Bellizzi, Dipali Rani Gupta, Nur Uddin Mahmud, Alfredo S. Urashima, Sanjoy Kumar Paul, Gary Peterson, Yilin Zhou, Xueping Zhou, Md Tofazzal Islam*, Guo-Liang Wang (2021). Engineering 7(9): 1326–1335.
- Choice of assemblers has a critical impact on de novo assembly of SARS-CoV-2 genome and characterizing variants. Rashedul Islam, Rajan Saha Raju, Nazia Tasnim, Md. Istiak Hossain Shihab, Maruf Ahmed Bhuiyan, Yusha Araf, Tofazzal Islam* (2021). Breefings in Bioinformatics, 22(5): bbab102.
- Emergence of wheat blast in Bangladesh was caused by a South American lineage of Magnaporthe oryzae. M. Tofazzal Islam*, Daniel Croll, Pierre Gladieux, Darren M. Soanes, Antoine Persoons, Pallab Bhattacharjee, Md. Shaid Hossain, Dipali Rani Gupta, Md. Mahbubur Rahman, M. Golam Mahboob, Nicola Cook, Moin U. Salam, Musrat Zahan Surovy, Vanessa Bueno Sancho, João Leodato Nunes Maciel, Antonio NhaniJúnior, Vanina Lilián Castroagudín, Juliana T. de Assis Reges, Paulo Cezar Ceresini, Sebastien Ravel, Ronny Kellner, Elisabeth Fournier, Didier Tharreau, Marc-Henri Lebrun, Bruce A. McDonald, Timothy Stitt, Daniel Swan, Nicholas J. Talbot, Diane G. O. Saunders, Joe Win and Sophien Kamoun (2016). BMC Biology 14:84.
