= Economy of Dhaka =

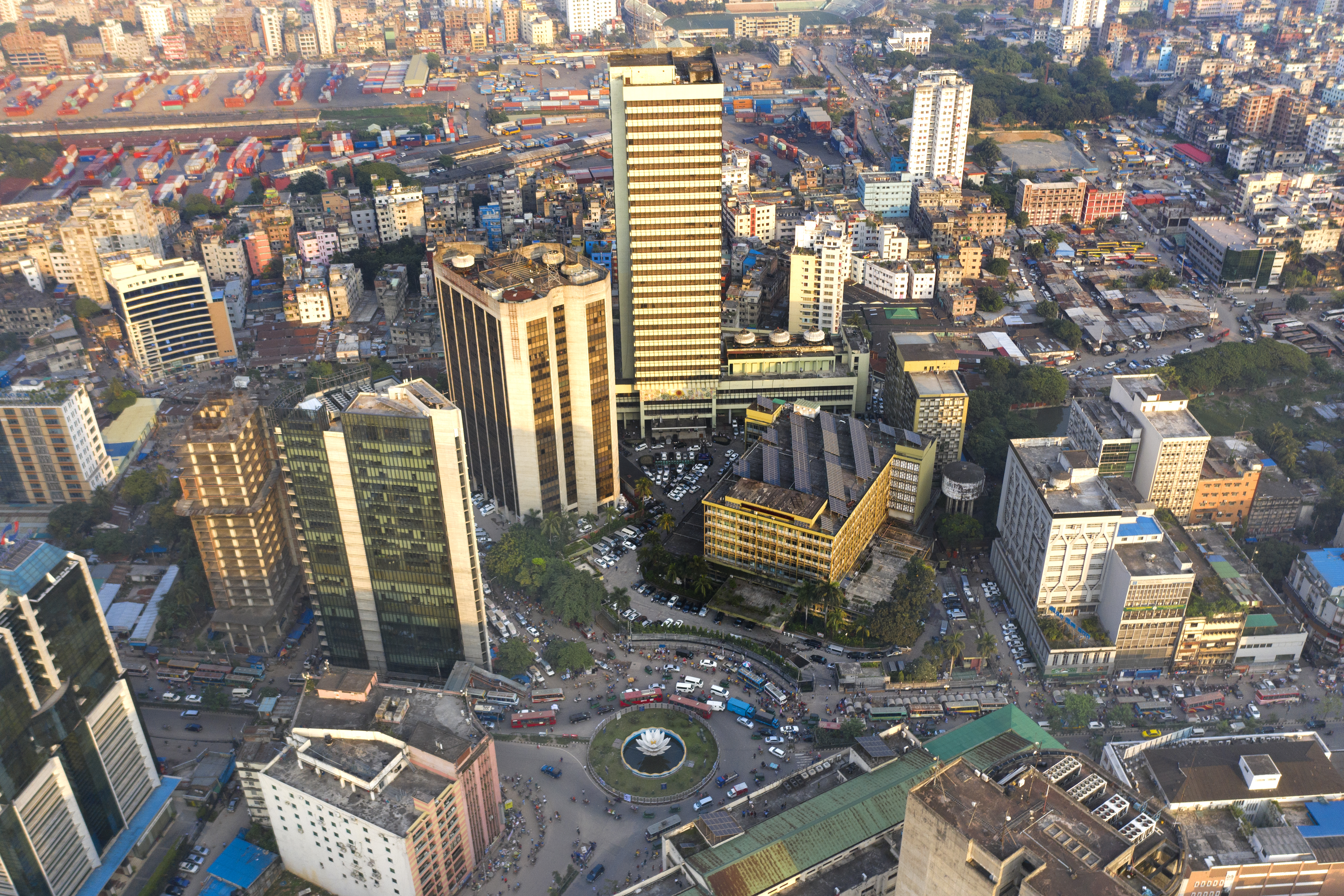
- Currency: Bangladeshi taka (BDT, ৳)
- Fiscal year: FY25-26
- Trade organisations: SAFTA, SAARC, BIMSTEC, WTO, AIIB, IMF, Commonwealth of Nations, World Bank, ADB, Developing-8
- Country group: Developing/Emerging

Statistics
- Population: 36.6 million (2025)
- GDP: ▲ ~US$235 billion (Nominal; 2026); ▲ ~US$890 billion (PPP; 2026)
- GDP rank: 1st in Bangladesh
- GDP growth: ▲5.78% (2023)
- GDP by sector: Agriculture: 11.20%; Industry: 37.56%; Services: 51.24%
- Population below national poverty line: 17.4% (2022)
- Human Development Index: 0.756 high · 1st of 20
- Average gross salary: ৳29700 (US$240) (per month 2023)
- Average net salary: ৳29700 (US$240) (per month 2023)
- Main industries: Textiles; Pharmaceutical Products; Electronics; Shipbuilding; Automotive; Bicycle; Leather; Jute; Fishing; Glass; Paper; Plastic; Food and Beverages; Cement; Natural Gas and Crude Petroleum; Iron and Steel; Ceramics

The economy of Dhaka is the largest in the People's Republic of Bangladesh, contributing ~US$235 billion in nominal gross state product and ~US$890 billion in purchasing power parity (PPP) terms as of 2026. If Dhaka were a sovereign nation, it would rank as the 50th largest economy in the world and fifth largest economy in South Asia, ahead of Myanmar, Nepal, Bhutan, Maldives, Afghanistan and behind India, Bangladesh, Pakistan and Sri Lanka.

Headquarters of major Bangladeshi financial institutions as Dhaka Stock Exchange, Bangladesh Bank, as well as major companies such as BEXIMCO, Bashundhara Group, PRAN-RFL Group, Dhaka serves as the financial hub of the country. Regional headquarters of many multi-national institutions such as GlaxoSmithKline, HeidelbergCement, Reckitt Benckiser, HSBC, British American Tobacco and Nestlé are also located in Dhaka. Dhaka Stock Exchange is the largest stock exchange in Bangladesh, and third largest in South Asia with a market capitalization of $72.1 billion.

Dhaka is the world's 38th largest city by GDP and has the country's only rapid transit system, the Dhaka Metro Rail.

== History ==
Due to its location right beside some main river routes, Dhaka was an important centre for business. Muslin fabric was produced and traded in this area.

Italian traveller Niccolao Manucci came to Dhaka in 1662–63. According to him, there were only two kuthis (trading posts) – one of the English and the other of the Dutch. Ships were loaded with fine white cotton and silk fabrics.

== Sectors ==
Top publicly traded companies
in Dhaka for 2023
Grameenphone
Walton Group
British American Tobacco Bangladesh
Square Pharmaceuticals
Robi Axiata Limited
United Power
Renata Limited
BEXIMCO

The manufacture of brick in Dhaka's suburbs, which adds little to gross national product, adds significantly to PM2.5 air pollution.

=== Environmental sector ===
Founded in 1996, Waste Concern is a Bangladeshi Social Business Enterprise (SBE) for waste recycling that offers solutions for waste management.

=== International trade and other sectors ===
Dhaka has historically derived significant revenue from international trade, textile, pharmaceutical and financial institutions.

== See also ==
- Economy of Bangladesh
- List of cities by GDP
