= Kaziboletus =

Scientific classification
- Domain: Eukaryota
- Kingdom: Fungi
- Division: Basidiomycota
- Class: Agaricomycetes
- Order: Boletales
- Family: Boletaceae
- Genus: Kaziboletus; Iqbal Hosen & Zhu L.Yang (2021)

Type species
- Kaziboletus rufescens Iqbal Hosen & Zhu L.Yang (2021)

Genus of fungi

Kaziboletus is a fungal genus in the family Boletaceae. Newly described in 2021, it is monotypic, containing the single species Kaziboletus rufescens, found in Bangladesh. The generic name Kaziboletus honors Kazi M. Badruddoza, a national emeritus scientist and founder of modern agriculture of Bangladesh, while rufescens refers to the context, which changes from white to pale red or reddish orange in patches when exposed.
