= Kazi M. Badruddoza =

Bangladeshi agronomist (1927–2023)

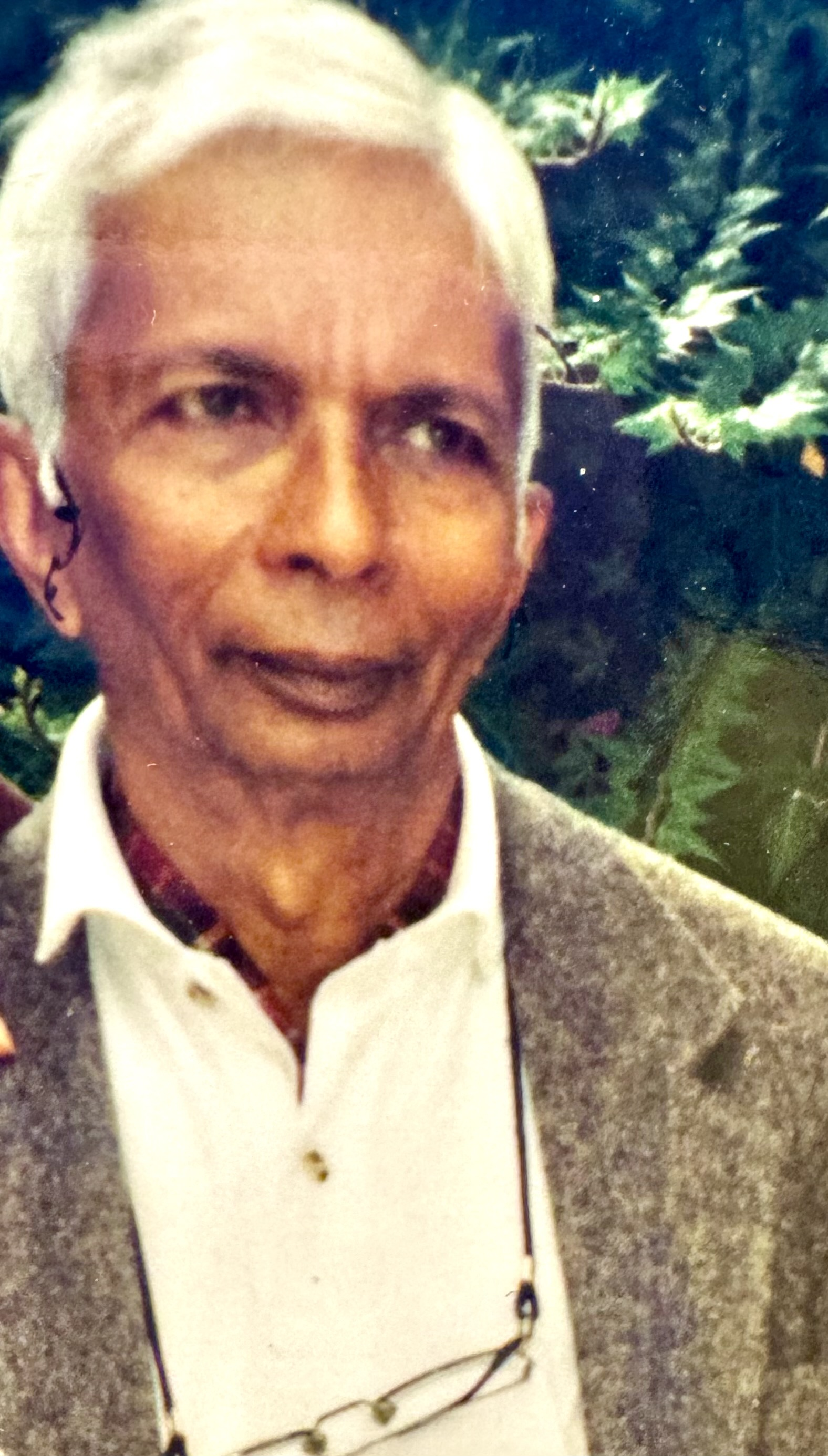
- Born: 1 January 1927; Bogra, Rajshahi Division, Bengal Presidency, British India
- Died: 30 August 2023 (aged 96); Dhaka, Bangladesh
- Education: University of Dhaka, BSc, M.Sc.; Louisiana State University, Ph.D.
- Known for: Research of genetics and plant pathology in wheat, maize, soybean and horticulture. Kazi Guava.
- Awards: Tamgha-e-Imtiaz (1968), Pakistan Government; Tamgha-e-Pakistan (1969), Pakistan Government; Independence Day Award (2012)[5], Bangladesh Government
- Scientific career
- Fields: Agronomy, Plant Pathology, Genetics.
- Workplaces: Louisiana State University; Lund Institute, Sweden; PARC (Pakistan Agriculture Research Council); BARC (Bangladesh Agriculture Research Council); Bangladesh Agriculture Research Institute; Institute of Postgraduate Studies in Agriculture (IPSA); Bangladesh Academy of Agriculture (BAAG); Food and Agriculture Organization (FAO), United Nations
- Thesis: Studies on the Isolates Physalospora Tucamanensis, Speg. (1957).

Kazi M. Badruddoza (1 January 1927 – 30 August 2023) was a Bangladeshi agronomist who is credited with using Agricultural Genetics and Plant Pathology to increase agricultural production in Bangladesh, contributing to greater self-sufficiency in staple cereal crops. He is known as the Father of Modern Agriculture in Bangladesh and the only National Emeritus Scientist of Bangladesh. He was one of the early leaders of the global team of the green revolution for his role in development of high yielding wheat, rice and maize varieties. For his work in Agricultural genetics, Badruddoza was awarded numerous honors, including the Independence Day award, the highest civilian award of Bangladesh. Prior to creation of Bangladesh as an independent state, he was also awarded the Tamgha-e-Imtiaz, a state organized civil award, in former West Pakistan, as well as the Tamgha-e-Pakistan. In addition, he is credited with the genetic engineering for the highly nutritious and large variety of guava, the Kazi Guava. In his honor, the genus of fungus, Kaziboletus. in the family Boletaceae, discovered in Bangladesh, was named after him.

== Early life and education ==
Kazi Badruddoza was born, eldest of six children, on Jan 1, 1927 in Bogra, East Bengal, British India, a town located 352 km north of Kolkata, former West Bengal, British India. His grandfather, a graduate of Campbell Medical College in Kolkata, was a General Medicine doctor in Gaibandha, East Bengal. His father, Advocate Kazi Badiuzzaman LLB, a law graduate from University of Calcutta in Kolkata, class of 1921, was a well-known attorney of the Gaibandha Court until his retirement in 1957. Badruddoza's ancestry can be traced to Meerut, Uttar Pradesh, India where his great-grandfather, a member of the Nawab of Meerut's family, was killed in the 1857 mutiny against British colonial rule causing the family to escape to Bengal.

After graduating high school in Gobindaganj, near Gaibandha, Kazi Badruddoza initially enrolled in University of Calcutta in Kolkata, West Bengal, British India in 1945. However, amidst the chaos of Partition of India in 1947, he returned home to Dhaka, former East Bengal which was soon to become East Pakistan. He enrolled in Dhaka University under the faculty of Agriculture, now known as Sher-e-Bangla Agricultural University. He completed his Bachelor of Science Hons. degree in Agriculture in 1948. He was appointed as a Research Assistant in Mycology, Department of Agriculture and meanwhile, completed his Master's of Science degree in Agricultural Botany in First Class. In 1953, he was appointed by Dhaka University as an Examiner of Mycology.

In 1954, he was selected by the United States Education Foundation in East Pakistan, for higher studies in the US with a Fulbright Scholarship. He entered Louisiana State University in September 1954, and was appointed as Graduate Assistant in July 1955. He completed his PhD in Plant Pathology from Louisiana State in 1957. His PhD thesis was titled "Studies on the Isolates Physalospora Tucamanensis, Speg."

In 1960, he obtained a Diploma in Genetics from Lund Institute, Sweden.

== Career in Agriculture ==
=== East Pakistan (current Bangladesh) ===
Upon receipt of his PhD in Plant Pathology at Louisiana State University, Badruddoza was offered faculty position there. Being the eldest of six siblings who were financially dependent on him, he declined the offer and returned home in 1957 to pursue a career in Agricultural Research in newly independent (East) Pakistan. There, he was appointed as head of the Fiber Division as Economic Botanist. Wheat and maize were unfamiliar crops to the farmers of the region. The Fiber Division carried out research on wheat and maize as well as tobacco.

=== Sweden ===
In order to advance genetic research in former East Pakistan in wheat and maize crops, Badruddoza was awarded scholarship to pursue post-doctoral research at the Lund Institute in Sweden. In 1960, he received his post-doctoral diploma in Plant Genetics and Research from the Lund Institute.

=== West Pakistan (current Pakistan) ===
Pakistan Agriculture Research Council (PARC)

High Yielding Wheat

While initially in the former East Pakistan upon his return from Sweden, Badruddoza, in 1964, was hired as Senior Director of Research at Pakistan Agriculture Research Council in Karachi, former West Pakistan. He worked closely with American Nobel Laureate and plant geneticist, Dr. Norman Borlaug, with objective of creating semi-dwarf but high yield and disease resistant Mexican wheat varieties in Pakistan. As a result, wheat production doubled in Pakistan between 1965 and 1970, leading to Pakistan's self-sufficiency in wheat production by 1968.

Maize Research

He then established a Maize Research Institute under the care of the private sector which was the first of its kind in Pakistan as well as the developing world. The technologies of the institute paved the way to self-sufficiency of Pakistan in corn oil production (Rafhan corn oil), starch, glucose, corn syrup and corn flakes.

He was an active member of the Pakistan Agricultural Research Coordination board, government of Pakistan (1964-1971), Central Jute Committee (1966-1971), Pakistan National Science Council (1961-1971). He also served on the Pakistan-American Joint Agricultural Research Evaluation Team (1968-1971). He was invited as the State Guest of the Government of former USSR and the Kingdom of Saudi Arabia. This was followed by his promotion appointment as the Executive Director of Pakistan Agriculture Research Council.

Subsequently, the Pakistan government honored him twice, with the Tamgha-e-Imtiaz in 1968, and Tamgha-e-Pakistan in 1969, the highest civilian award at the time of former West Pakistan, both awarded by then President Ayub Khan.

Following the 1971 India-Pakistan war and creation of independent Bangladesh, he was detained, in 1972, at an internment camp by the Pakistani government along with other high-ranking officials from former East Pakistan. In 1973, he was repatriated to what was now Bangladesh.

=== Bangladesh Agriculture Research Council (BARC) ===
In the newly formed independent state of Bangladesh, he was initially appointed as the Director of Agriculture Research Council, followed by Director of Bangladesh Agriculture Research and Education. This led to a rapidly growing research career for Badruddoza in the new country.

=== Disease Resistant and High Yielding Wheat ===
As a research administrator, he used his experience from Pakistan and focused on wheat research program, which was in its infancy in the post war, fledgling nation.

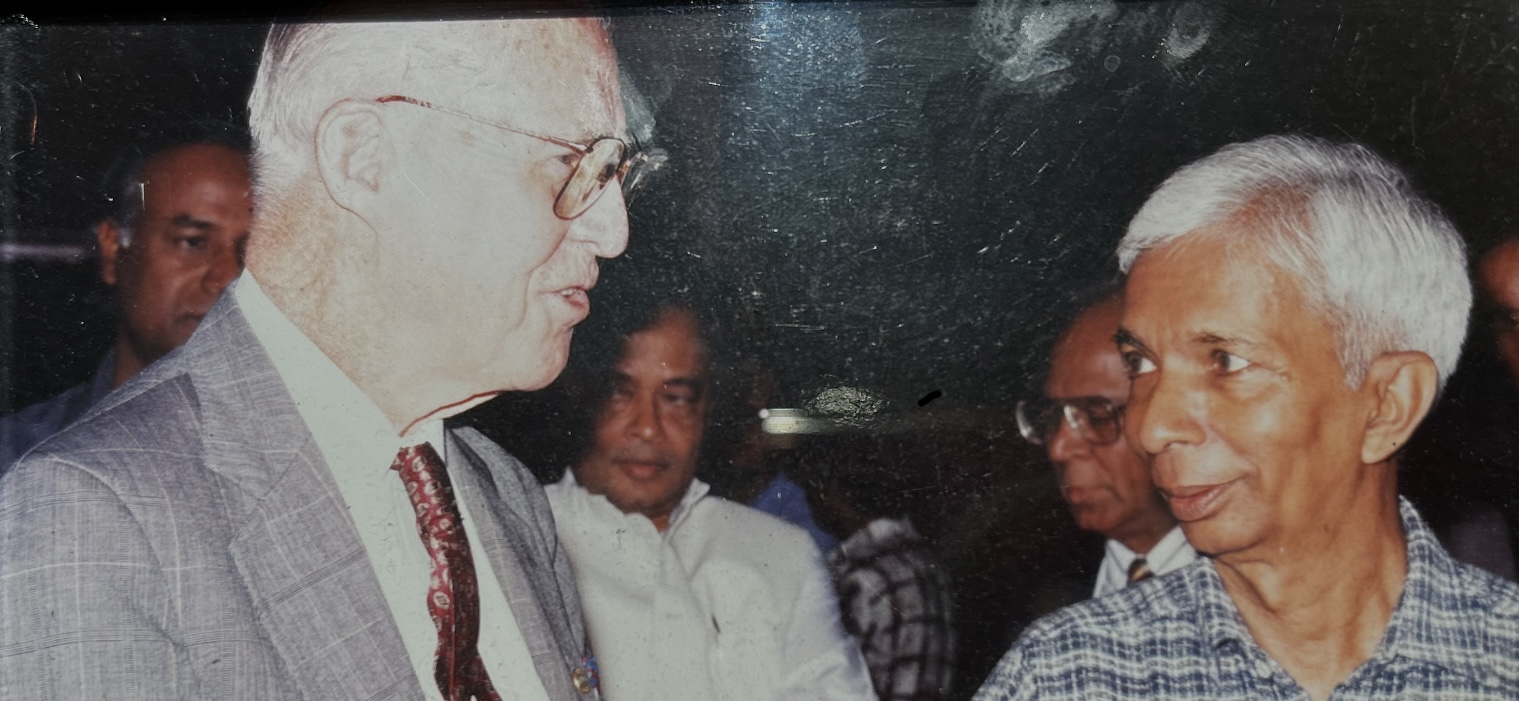
Badruddoza with Norman Borlaug at a meeting in Dhaka for high yield wheat species 1998

In appreciation of Badruddoza's role in developing the wheat program of Bangladesh, Nobel Laureate Dr. Norman Borlaug wrote in a letter to the President of Bangladesh on April 28, 1978: "When I visited Bangladesh less than four years ago, there was no mention of wheat in the agricultural plan. Nevertheless, during the current crop cycle, Bangladesh harvested between 350,000 to 400,000 acres of wheat, much of it with excellent yield. This fantastic accomplishment could not have been achieved without the vision and organizational ability of the Director of Bangladesh Agriculture Research Institute, Dr. Kazi M. Badruddoza. Under his leadership, he has assembled an enthusiastic and well-motivated team of research scientists."

Wheat production was 849,000 tons in 2008-09 and has now increased to 1.17 million tons in 2022–23.

=== Maize Research ===
Although grown for centuries by the ethnic minorities in the Garo Hills and Chittagong Hill Tracts, maize was not well known by Bangladesh farmers. It ranked third after wheat and rice as a cereal crop but had potential of a staple along with wheat, when rice yield was low in the war-torn nation with severe food deficit. Badruddoza furthered the growth of disease and climate resistance maize crops in the country, coordinated by Bangladesh Agriculture Research Council (BARC). By the start of the millennium, the area of maize had increased by 7 times, production by forty times and yield by six times. The demand continues to rise as a result of genetically advanced varieties. Maize production was at 700,000 tons in 2008–09, and now at 6.4 million tons in 2022–23.

=== Soybean Research ===
Badruddoza introduced high yielding soybean crop through a research project also coordinated by BARC in 1975. The project involved eleven organizations including the Bangladesh Agriculture Research Institute (BARI), Bangladesh Rice Research Institute (BRRI), Bangladesh Agricultural University, Rajshahi University, Shilpee Food Products as well as resources from the NGP Mennonite Central Committee (MCC). He proposed fat free soybean meal as a significant and inexpensive source of protein for animal feeds and many pre-packaged meals, as well as soybean products such as Textured Vegetable Protein (TVP) as ingredients in meat and dairy analogues. Today, multiple regions in Bangladesh such as Barisal, Bhola, Faridpur and Mymensingh grow soybean crops on large acres of land as one of the primary sources of land grown protein. As of 2009, 85,000 metric tons of soybean were produced on 47,000 hectares of land under Badruddoza's Soybean Project of the Department of Agriculture Extension.

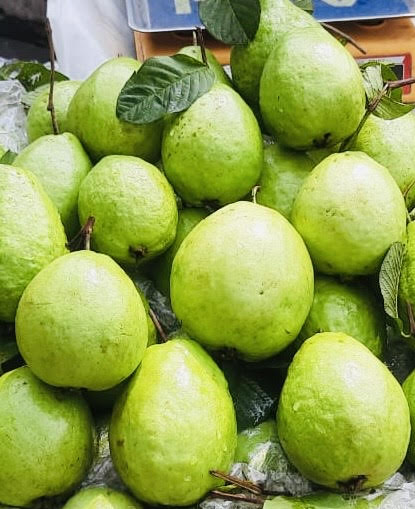
Kazi Guava in a Dhaka fruit market 2023

=== Kazi Guava ===
In 1984, in a survey conducted by the Institute of Nutrition and Food Science under Dhaka University. it was found that 93% people in the country suffered severe Vitamin C deficiency. Kazi Guava or commonly known locally as Kazi Peyara (Psidium Guajava) was introduced in 1985 by Bangladesh Agriculture Research Institute and named after Kazi Badruddoza, for his leadership in meticulous plant breeding techniques between local and Thai varieties to introduce a large and inexpensive, crispy genetic variant, rich in Vitamin C (200 mg in 10 g edible part of Kazi Guava). Today, Kazi Guava is cultivated widely everywhere in the nation and profitable to farmers in multiple regions in the nation studied by Bangladesh Agriculture Research Institute.

=== Amrapali Mango ===
Due to Bangladesh's pre-occupation with cereal crop shortage, research on fruits and vegetables was neglected in the seventies and eighties. Badruddoza is credited with establishing, under supervision of the Bangladesh Agriculture Research Institute, the Horticulture Research Center, the Tuber Crops Research Center and the Spice Research Center. This led to significant growth of multiple vegetable varieties and disease resistant potato strains in a post war nation, contributing to growth in vegetable varieties and disease-resistant potato strains in the country.

To facilitate horticultural hybridization, Badruddoza introduced germplasm of the Amrapali mango with the help of an Indian agronomist Dr Rajan Dey, making this variety a widely available and popular genetic variant.

=== Livestock and Fisheries Research ===
As a chairman of the Bangladesh Agriculture Research Council, Badruddoza led the initiative to establish the Bangladesh Livestock Research Institute and the Bangladesh Fisheries Research Institute in Mymensingh. Through the Soil Resources Development Institute (SRDI) and BARI, Badruddoza inspired group farming in Maheswar Chanda village, training famers in utilizing fertilizer resources as well as in fish fingerling production. According to the Food and Agriculture Organization, United Nations, Bangladesh ranks third in the world in inland open fish farming and fifth in aquaculture. Based on data from the Department of Fisheries, more than 5.4 million tons of fish have been produced in 2023.

=== Bangladesh Agriculture Research Institute (BARI) ===
In 1975, Badruddoza worked through political loopholes and succeeded in obtaining government clearance for establishment of an autonomous agricultural research organization, the Bangladesh Agriculture Research Institute, BARI. He personally supervised the infrastructure of BARI in Joydebpur, while simultaneously overseeing its regional stations and substations throughout the nation. According to his colleagues, he spent many a night in the institute's half constructed buildings working sleeplessly, over a period of two years. Badruddoza thus became the Founder Director (now Director General) of BARI in 1976. Today, BARI is a sprawling institute of research with multiple genetic research laboratories, greenhouses, livestock and horticulture research facilities as well as a wide expanse of agricultural fields for cereals crops, which are constantly improved for disease and drought resistance.

According to the State of Food Security and Nutrition in the World report of the United Nations Food and Agriculture Organization (FAO), this genetics and plant pathology acumen has resulted in 3-5 times increase in major food grains in Bangladesh since 1971, and according to the Ministry of Food, it has also awarded Bangladesh, once a starving nation, self-sufficiency in rice, fish, vegetable and meat production.

== Academic career ==
=== Introduction of PhD programs ===
Prior to the 1990s, prospective researchers sought Ph.D. abroad. Badruddoza introduced Ph.D. programs in local agricultural universities in collaboration with donor agencies. He proposed a Ph.D. program where a candidate could run research on a local project with the supervision of local and foreign experts. Uppsala University, Sweden and Dhaka University have collaborated on such Ph.D. programs.

=== Institute of Postgraduate Studies in Agriculture (IPSA) ===
Badruddoza proposed in a concept paper in 1988, the establishment of IPSA, now known as Bangabandhu Sheikh Mujibur Rahman Agricultural University (BSMARAU), as a post graduate research institute among a rural setting among local farmers. For this objective, this post graduate institute was established in Salna, Gazipur, which went on to produce many of the country's lead Ph.D. researchers today. While in a rural environment, it maintains, for its researchers, the proximity to Bangladesh Agriculture Research Institute and Bangladesh Rice Research Institute. Badruddoza gave the first convocation speech in 1995.

=== Bangladesh Academy of Agriculture (BAAG) ===
Badruddoza established BAAG in 1994. Its objective is to recruit Research Fellows, experts in crops, livestock, fisheries and forestry to promote sustainable agriculture, assist government policy and programs for agricultural development. It also assists NGOs to facilitate resources for farmers and participates in international agricultural research to benefit local crops. The Academy gives awards for outstanding contributions in Agriculture research and publishes the journal “Journal of Bangladesh Agriculture.” Badruddoza was the Founder President of the Academy, a position which he held repeatedly through his life.

=== Global Agriculture Research ===
Internationally, Badruddoza was a member of the Advisory Committee of the International Bank for Asia, Manila. The Team for Quinquennial Review of International Rice Research Institute, Laguna, Philippines included him as a board member in 1989. He was also selected as member of the Governing Board of the Regional Co-ordination Center for Research and Development of Coarse Grain, Pulses, Roots and Tuber Crops in the Humid Tropics of Asia and the Pacific (1984). He was also member of the board of the International Service for National Agriculture Research (ISNAR) and Bangladesh Representative for the Commonwealth Agricultural Bureau (CAB).

United Nations (Food and Agriculture Organization)

Vietnam

Upon his retirement in Bangladesh 1985, Badruddoza was not ready to quit agriculture research. The Food and Agriculture Organization (FAO), United Nations, appointed him Chief Plant Pathologist and Geneticist in another war-torn nation of the time, and in 1985, he set off for Hanoi, Vietnam.

During his 5-year tenure in Vietnam, he worked with international plant geneticists to create chemical warfare resistant as well as drought and disease resistant rice crops. This research propelled the growth of high yield crops supporting the growth of Vietnam's agricultural sector.

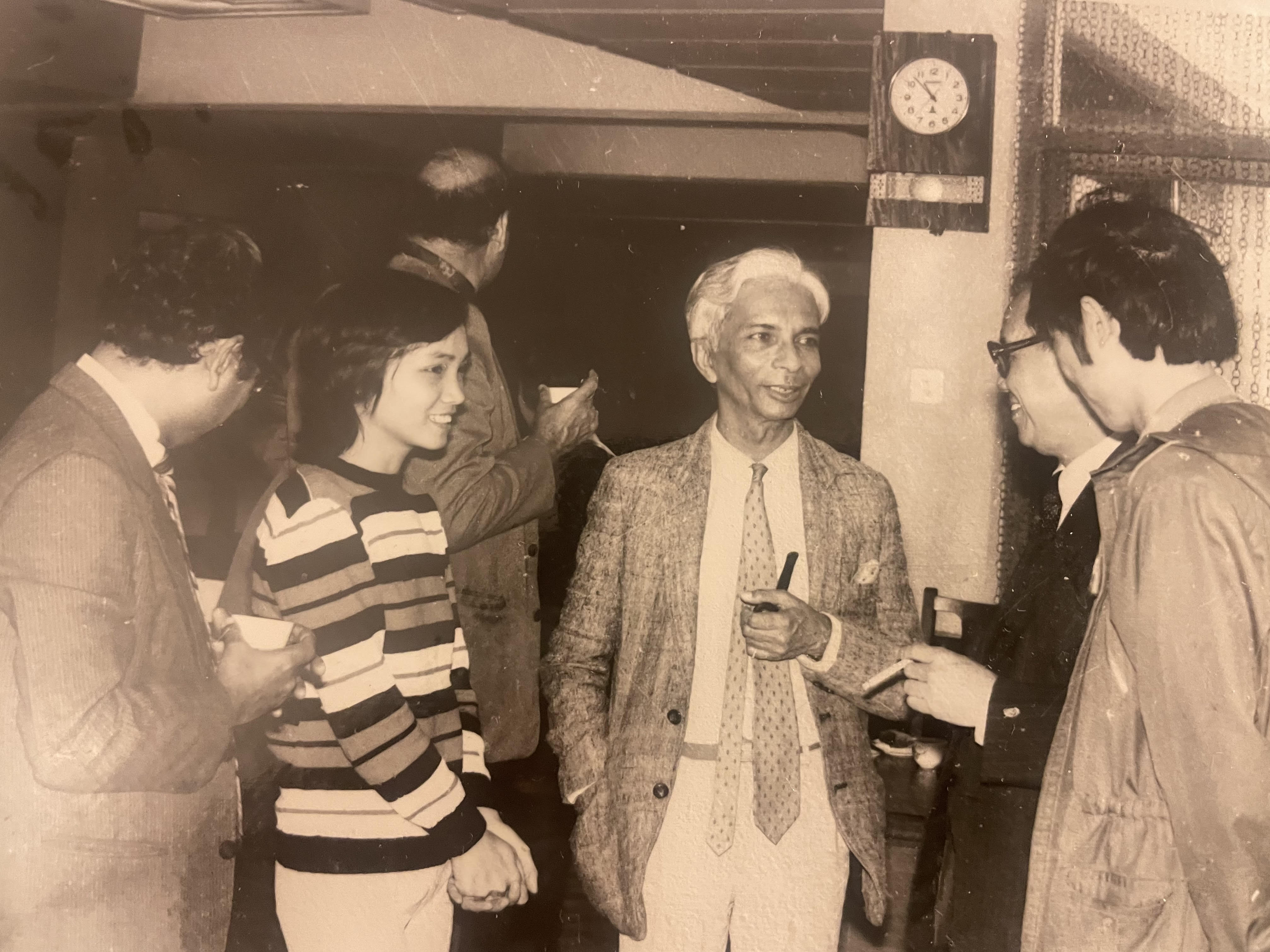
Dr. Badruddoza at Food and Agriculture Organization meeting in Hanoi, Vietnam 1985.

=== Retirement ===
Although officially retired as of February 28, 1985, Badruddoza never ceased to work in agriculture genetics. Upon return from Vietnam, Badruddoza, wishing to continue Bangladesh toward self-sufficiency in agriculture, re-focused his post-retirement career on building Bangladesh's agricultural research in the aforementioned research and academic fields.

Upon his retirement, the U.S. Ambassador Howard B. Schaffer sent him a certificate of appreciation:

"Your professional leadership in the agricultural research system of Bangladesh over the last two decades has been of the highest quality and is reflected in the strength and quality of the Bangladesh Agriculture Research Council (BARC) member institutes, their commitment to increase agricultural productivity through scientific interventions is internationally recognized and respected as a result of your guidance. The US government is extremely proud of its associations with you as the BARC Chairman..."

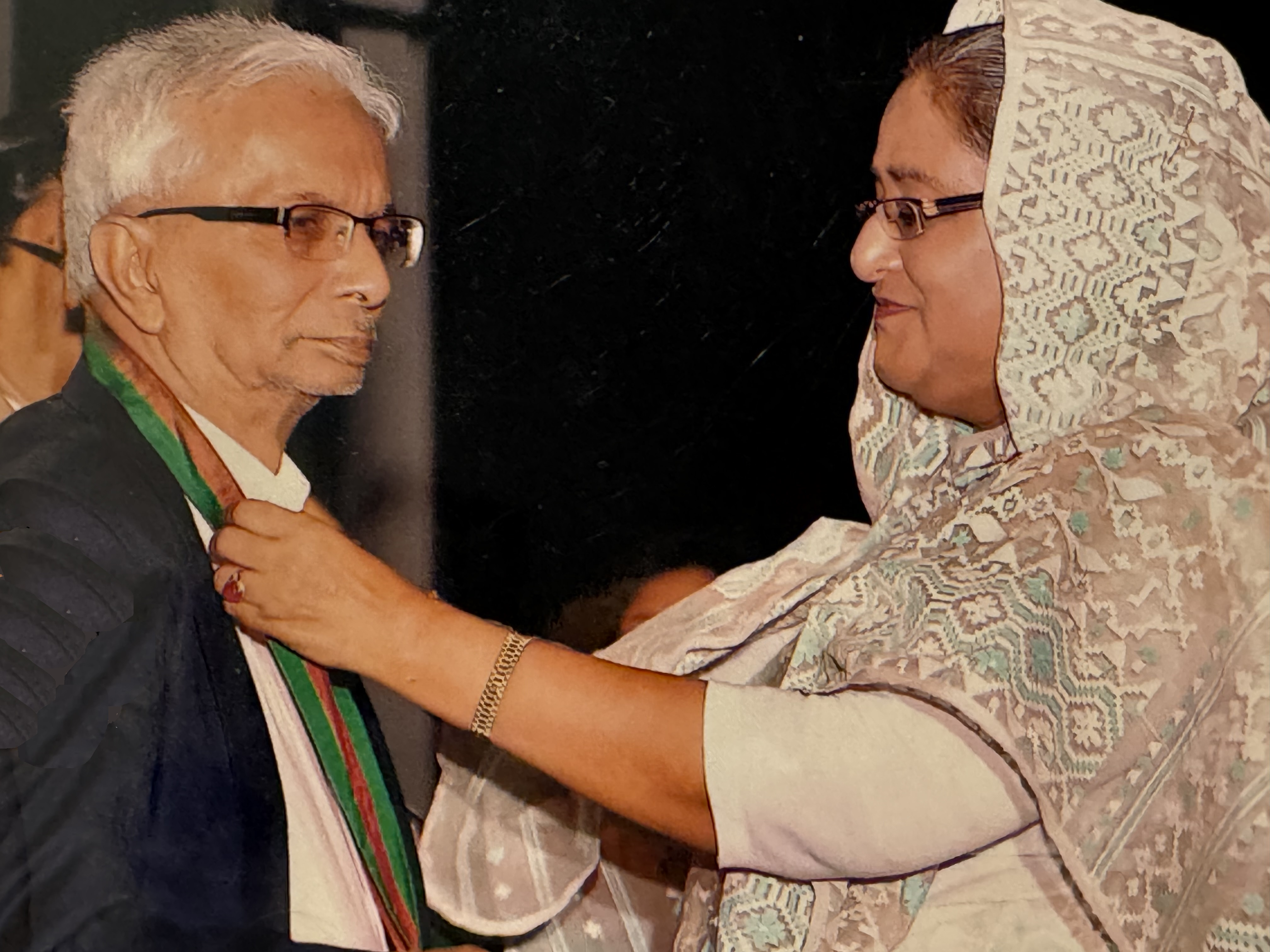
Dr. Badruddoza receiving the Independence Day Award from PM Shaikh Hasina, 2012

In 1985, the Government of the People's Republic of Bangladesh conferred on him the title of "National Emeritus Scientist" thus formally honoring him with continual role of science and research advisor to BARC, BARI, and the Government. As of now, he was the only scientist in the country to hold that title.

== Personal life ==
Badruddoza is survived by his wife, Razia, a Nutritional Science academic, whom he met at Louisiana State University. They have two children both of whom are physicians and reside in the US with their families. Throughout his career, Badruddoza remained a proud alumnus of Louisiana State University (LSU) and over the next 66 years since leaving LSU, continued to receive their alumnus newsletter in multiple countries of his residence, and in Dhaka, until his death.

== Death ==
Badruddoza died August 30, 2023, at the age of 96 in Dhaka, at a private hospital, surrounded by his two children, grandchildren, personal caregivers, secretarial staff and several prominent members of Bangladesh's agriculture research community. Thousands from the Agricultural research community attended his funeral, including political leaders of the field of Agriculture such as Minister of Agriculture Dr Muhammad Abdur Razzaque and Joint General Secretary of Bangladesh Awami League, AFM Bahauddin Nasim.

Upon his death, Prime Minister Sheikh Hasina said, "The death of this renowned agricultural scientist and successful organizer has caused an irreparable loss to the country in the field of agriculture."

Noble Laureate Professor Muhammad Yunus said, "He was a thorough gentleman and a dedicated scientist. Sorry to see him go."

Minister of Agriculture Dr Abdur Razzaque stated, 'Dr Badruddoza was the one who arranged for me to attend Purdue University for my Ph.D. He always believed in furthering education."

Following his wish to return to his roots, Badruddoza was laid to rest in family cemetery in his ancestral town of Gobindganj, where he had last lived as a high school student.

== Awards ==
- Tamgha-e-Imtiaz (1968), Pakistan Government, President Ayub Khan.
- Tamgha-e-Pakistan (1969), Pakistan Government, President Ayub Khan.
- Gold Medal (1983), Jebunnessa and Kazi Mahbubullah Jana Kalyan Trust.
- National Emeritus Scientist (1985), Government of Bangladesh.
- Certificate and Award of Appreciation (1985), Ambassador of the United States of America.
- Gold Medal (1991), Third National Convention of the Krishibid Institution.
- Gold Medal (1997), Farmers of Maheswar Chanda Village, and Dr Hasanuzzaman.
- Certificate and Award of Appreciation (1999), Consultative Group of International Agriculture Research (CGIR) and World Bank, Washington DC.
- Gold Medal (2000), Bangladesh Horticulture Association.
- Gold Medal (2003), Deshbandhu Chittaranjan Das Research Council.
- Gold Medal (2005), Plant Breeding and Genetics Society, Bangladesh.
- Gold Medal (2009), Abu Hossain Sarkar Memorial Trust.
- Gold Medal (2010), Bangladesh Academy of Agriculture.
- Gold Medal (2011), The Krishibid Institution, Bangladesh.
- Certificate and Award: Lifelong Honour, Channel 'i' (2010), media organization of Bangladesh.
- Gold Medal (2012), Resource Development Foundation.
- Crest of Merit (2012), Campaign for Sustainable Rural Livelihood (CSRL).
- Independence Day Award (2012) Highest Civilian Award, Bangladesh Government, Prime Minister Sheikh Hasina.
- DeshBandhu Chittaranjan Das Research Council award (2013)
- Dr. M.O Gani Memorial Gold Medal by Bangladesh Academy Sciences and Research Development Foundation (2015)
- Standard Chartered Bank Agro lifetime achievement award (2020), for agriculture research and development.

== Eponyms ==
- A variety of guava, Kazipeyara.
- The fungal genus Kaziboletus.
- "Kbd. Dr. Kazi M. Badruddoza Outreach Center" at Bangabandhu Sheikh Mujibur Rahman Agricultural University.
