= Gazipur Agricultural University =

Agricultural university in Gazipur, Bangladesh

- গাজীপুর কৃষি বিশ্ববিদ্যালয়
- Logo of Gazipur Agricultural University
- Other name: GAU
- Former names: Bangladesh College of Agricultural Science, Institute of Post-Graduate Studies in Agriculture (1978-1998); Bangabandhu Sheikh Mujibur Rahman Agricultural University (1998-2024)
- Motto: Bengali: জ্ঞান, দক্ষতা, প্রযুক্তি, সমৃদ্ধি
- Motto in English: Knowledge, Skills, Technology, Progress
- Type: Public agricultural university
- Established: 22 November 1998; 27 years ago
- Affiliations: University Grants Commission (UGC)
- Chancellor: President Mirza Fakhrul Islam Alamgir
- Vice-Chancellor: GKM Mustafizur Rahman
- Academic staff: 214
- Administrative staff: 365
- Students: 2000
- Undergraduates: 1400
- Postgraduates: 550
- Doctoral students: 25
- Location: Gazipur, Gazipur District, Bangladesh; 24.0362°N 90.3959°E
- Campus: 180 acres (73 ha); Rural, 190 acres (77 ha)
- Website: gau.edu.bd

University rankings

Global – Overall
- THE World: 800-1000 (2026)

Global – Life sciences and medicine
- THE Life Sciences: 601-800 (2026)

Gazipur Agricultural University (GAU) (Bengali: গাজীপুর কৃষি বিশ্ববিদ্যালয় (গাকৃবি)) is a public agricultural university in Bangladesh, established in 1998. It was the first Graduate Agricultural Institute in Bangladesh emphasizing research and extension. It is located at South Salna, in Gazipur District. It is 9.5 kilometres (5.9 mi) from Gazipur Chowrasta, just east of the Dhaka-Mymensingh Highway.

As of Times Higher Education World University Ranking of 2025, Gazipur Agricultural University (GAU) stood first in all categories among all universities of Bangladesh.

Moreover, according to the "Scimago Institute Rankings, 2021" report, Gazipur Agricultural University was ranked first in these three indices of research, innovation and social position among the public and private universities of Bangladesh considering international standards.

== History ==
Gazipur Agricultural University was established on 22 November 1998. The university was named after Sheikh Mujibur Rahman as Bangabandhu Sheikh Mujibur Rahman Agricultural University. Previously, it was established as Institute of Post Graduate Studies in Agriculture (IPSA). Japan International Cooperation Agency (JICA) contributed to establish IPSA through its Grant Aid and Technical Cooperation projects since 1978 as a "Center of Excellence" for agricultural education and research in Bangladesh. 1983, IPSA was originally established as the Bangladesh College of Agricultural Sciences (BCAS). It was an academic part of Bangladesh Agricultural Research Institute (BARI) and associated academically with Bangladesh Agricultural University. IPSA was transformed in an autonomous institution by the government of Bangladesh and started course credit based MS and Ph.D. programs in 1991. The graduate program of IPSA was developed by the teachers of IPSA led by L. M. Eisgruver of Oregon State University (OSU).

In 1998, IPSA transformed into GAU (formerly BSMRAU). As a public university, it continued the post-graduate program and launched an undergraduate program. In 2005, GAU (formerly BSMRAU) started to offer a Bachelor of Science degree in Agriculture [BS (Agriculture)].

In 2008, GAU (formerly BSMRAU) established its Faculty of Fisheries and started to offer a BS degree in Fisheries. The Faculty of Veterinary Medicine and Animal Sciences was established in 2009 and started to offer the Doctor of Veterinary Medicine (DVM) degree. After 3 years, in 2012, GAU (formerly BSMRAU) established the Faculty of Agricultural Economics and Rural Development and started offering a BS in Agricultural Economics. Now, GAU has five faculties. and one Institute Institute of Biotechnology and Genetic Engineering (IBGE), while a Faculty of Forest and Environment is under the process of establishment. Another two institutes namely, Institute of Climate Change (ICC) and Institute of Food Safety and Processing (IFSP) are under the process of operation.

After the fall of the Sheikh Hasina-led Awami League administration, Bangabandhu Sheikh Mujibur Rahman Agricultural University (BSMRAU) was renamed to Gazipur Agricultural University (GAU).

== List of vice-chancellors ==
7. GKM Mustafizur Rahman (27 October 2024 – present)

6. Md. Giashuddin Miah (11 June 2017 - 19 August 2024)

5. Md. Mahbubar Rahman (20 March 2013 - 19 March 2017)

4. Md. Abdul Mannan Akanda (11 March 2009 - 20 March 2013)

3. Lutfor Rahman Khan (9 January 2006 - 10 March 2009)

2. Abdul Halim Khan (12 December 2001 - 11 December 2005)

1. Ashraful Kamal (26 April 1999 - 11 December 2001)

== Campus ==
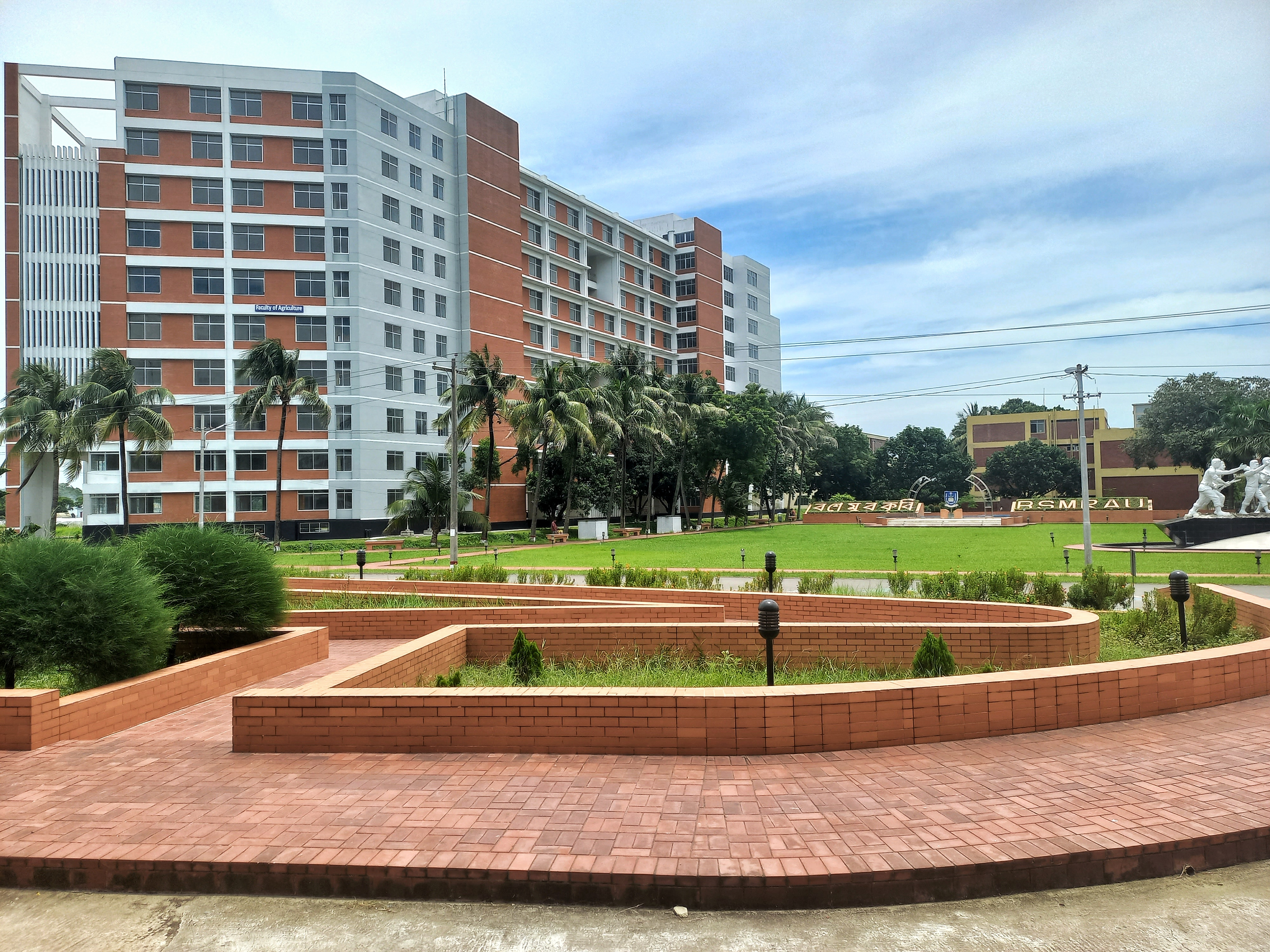
View of GAU campus from TSC

GAU is situated in Salna of Gazipur city corporation on the Dhaka-Mymensingh highway, 15 kilometres (9.3 mi) from Gazipur district headquarters, 9.5 kilometres (5.9 mi) from Joydebpur Chourasta, 5 kilometres (3.1 mi) from Security Printing Press and Ordinance Factory, and 40 kilometres (25 mi) away from Dhaka city. The campus covers an area of 190 acres (77 ha) land including about 50 acres (20 ha) of well-developed experimental farm area. Located in a rural setting in between Joydebpur Chawrasta and Bhawal National Park, surrounded by the Sal forest of the Madhupur Tract and characterized by the topographical diversity with undulated land.

The university has a regular bus service from campus to Dhaka (Farmgate) twice a day including Friday. It also has a campus to Joydepur in near to 2 hour intervals. According to GAU, it offers a calm and quiet campus that is suitable for academic pursuit.

=== Infrastructure ===
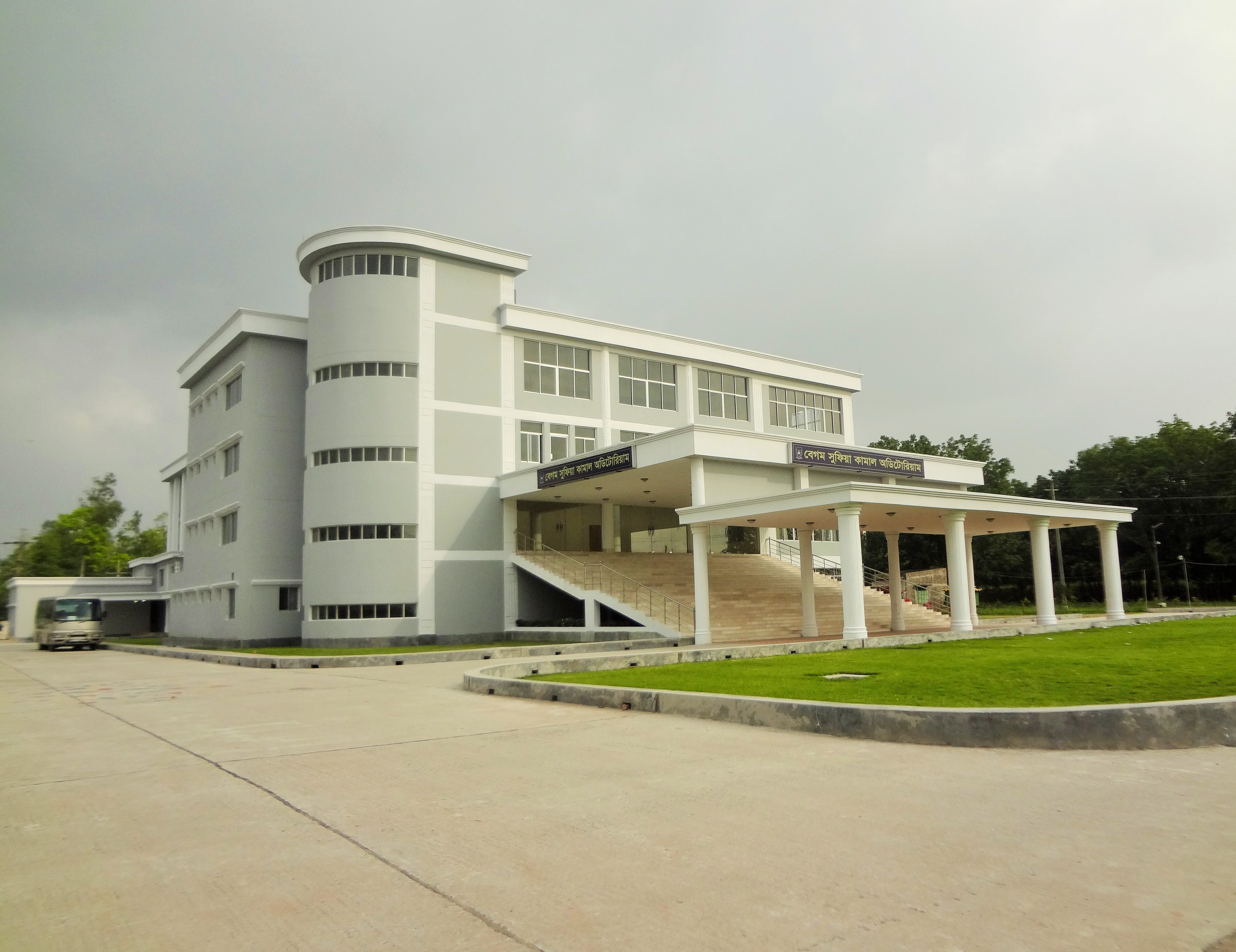
Begum Sufiya Kamal Auditorium

- Administrative Building
- 5 Faculty Buildings
- 6 Students Dormitory (3 for Male and 3 for Female students)
- Residential Facilities for Teachers, Officers, and Employees
- Kbd. Dr. Kazi M. Badruddoza Outreach Center
- Dr. M. Wazed Mia Central Laboratory
- Technology Exhibition Center
- Yamada Yoshio Library and AV Room
- Ex-situ Gene Bank/ Eco Park
- Central Mosque
- Begum Sufiya Kamal Auditorium (Accommodation of Around 1,000 seats)
- Conference Room
- Research Field
- Digital Herbarium and Herbal museum for Crop Plant
- Lake View Study Park
- Modern TSC
- Cafetaria
- Canteen
- Health Centre
- International Complex
- Shaheed Minar (Monument)
- Sports Ground
- GAU Sub-postoffice
- Gymnasium
- Guest House
- Sonali Bank Branch and DBBL Fast Track with ATM Booth
- GAU School
- Nursery/Children Park
- BECS Supershop
- Ansar Camp
- Veterinary Clinic
- International Complex

== Academics ==
English is the medium of instruction at GAU. The study at GAU comprises Term based Course Credit System, which the students can understand going through the following points thoroughly:

1. The Course Credit System: The course credit system involves course work with regular classes, assignments, unannounced quizzes, and pre-scheduled 2 midterms and final examinations. In this system, subject matter is taught in modules (courses) of reasonably homogenous subject matter, The students will receive "Grades" for each of the courses taken to indicate the extent of his/her mastery of the subject matter taught in each respective course.
2. Term: An academic year is divided into three terms – Summer, Autumn and Winter. Each term consists of 12 (twelve) effective weeks.
3. Credit: One class hour in a week during a term shall be considered as one credit. For laboratory classes, two class hours shall be considered as one credit.
4. Course: A course is a set of topics delivered to the students by lectures, contact hours and practical exercises on a specific subject incorporated in the approved curricular layout and developed by the Board of Studies (BOS) to offer in a term.
5. Course Coding: Each course is designated by 3 (three) capital letters and a 3-digit number. The 3 letters indicate the department offering the course. Of the three digits, the first digit indicates the academic year in which the course is normally offered. The next two digits indicate the offering term, where 01-30 stand for the First term, 31-60 for the Second term, and 61-99 for the third term.

=== Research and publications ===
The university has been conducting researches from its inception shouldering active roles in the national and international agricultural research arena. Teaching excellence and effective research are conclusively interrelated in academics and that of innovation in programs. Classrooms teaching are continually powered and enriched by those faculty members who are actively engaged in research. Faculty members of this university have many long and short-term research projects and these projects are prepared as per national agricultural research needs and implemented. Some of the faculty members also prepare and implement research projects in collaboration with national and international research scientists. In many cases, the postgraduate student research is linked with the research projects of the faculty members. The functions of the research management wing are to integrate the research programs undertaken by different academic departments, allocate budget, publish research abstracts, journals annual report, invite Research Management Committee (RMC) funded research project proposals, and evaluate, implement and monitor these projects.

Some of the Research Journals Publishes by the university is given below:

- Annals of Bangladesh Agriculture (GAU)
- Bangladesh Journal of Entomology (BES/GAU)
- Bangladesh Journal of Plant Breeding and Genetics (GAU)
- Bangladesh Journal of Plant Pathology (BPS/GAU)

Besides the university publishes An Informative Magazine about its various activities called "GAU Barta".

GAU has developed 44 improved varieties of vegetables, cereals, pulses, fruits and flowers which are commercially cultivated by farmers throughout Bangladesh due to their high yield and nutritional potentials.

=== World ranking ===
In the SCImago Institutions Rankings for 2024, GAU Ranks 4477th in the world and 25th of 41 in Bangladesh.

== Faculties and departments ==
=== 2. Faculty of Agriculture ===
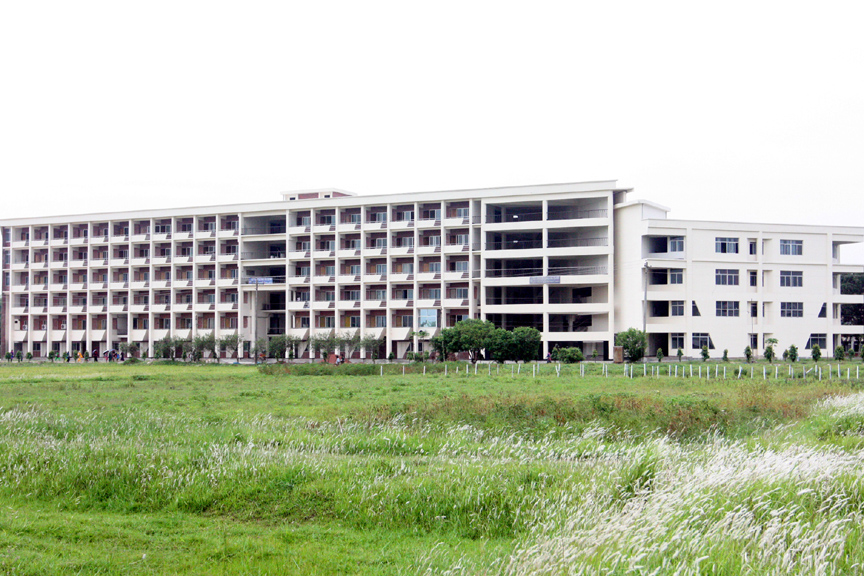
Agriculture Faculty Bulilding

- Agricultural Extension and Rural Development
- Agroforestry and Environment
- Agronomy
- Agro-processing
- Biochemistry and Molecular Biology
- Environmental Science
- Biotechnology
- Computer Science and Information Technology( CSIT )
- Crop Botany
- Entomology
- Genetics and Plant Breeding
- Horticulture
- Plant Pathology
- Soil Science
- Seed Science and Technology Unit

=== 3. Faculty of Fisheries ===
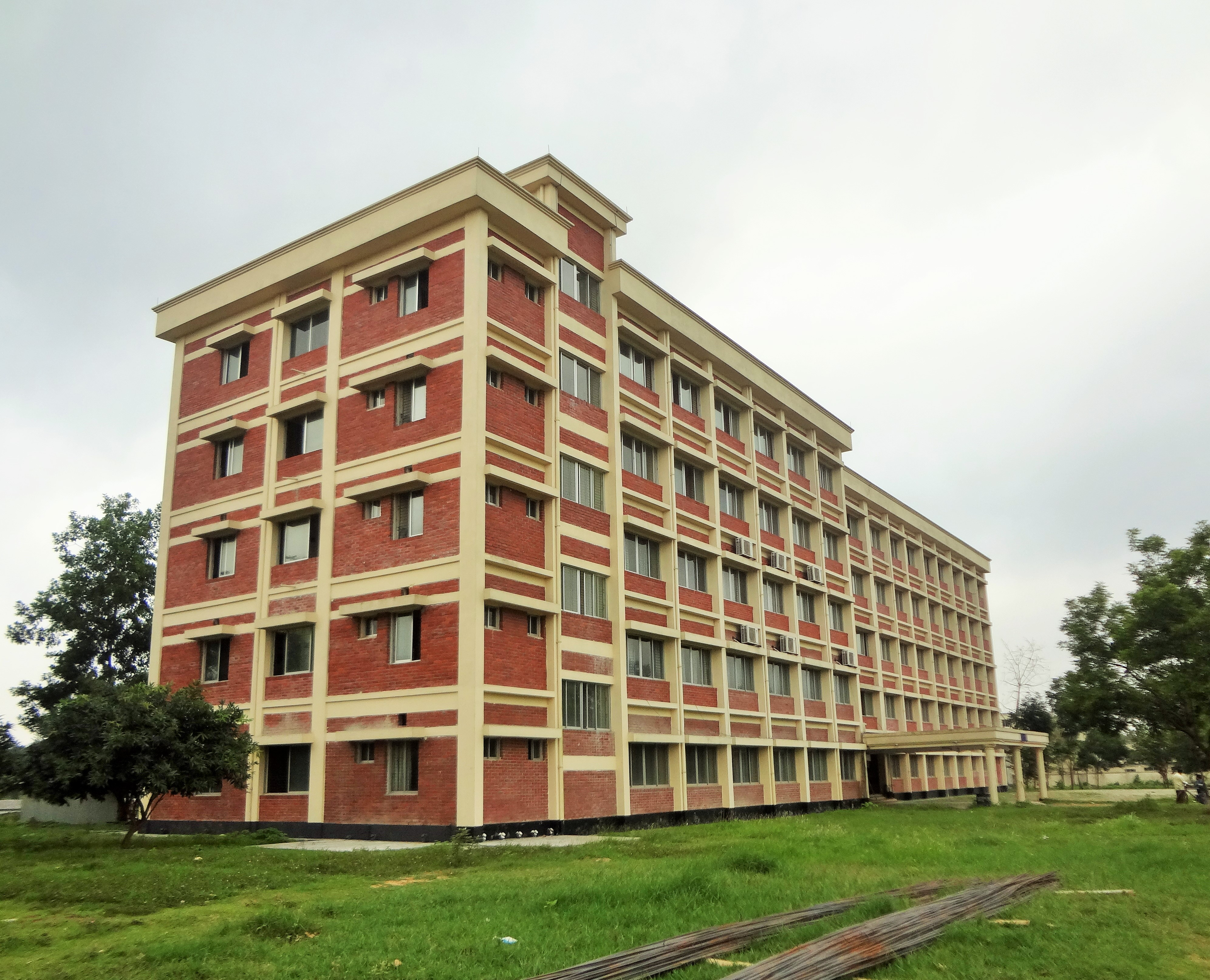
Fisheries Faculty Building

- Department of Aquaculture
- Fisheries Biology and Aquatic Environment
- Fisheries Management
- Fisheries Technology
- Genetics and Fish Breeding

=== 4. Faculty of Veterinary Medicine and Animal Science ===
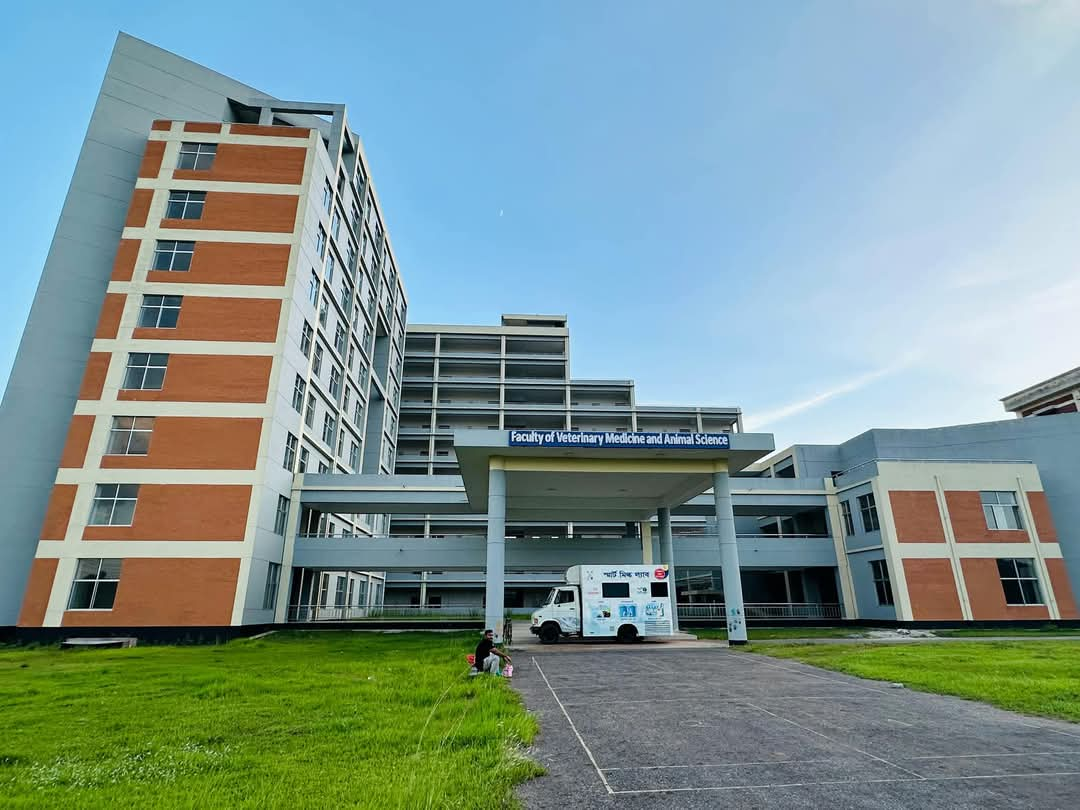
Veterinary Complex, Faculty of Veterinary Medicine and Animal Science, GAU

- Department of Anatomy & Histology
- Department of Animal breeding & Genetics
- Department of Animal science & Nutrition
- Department of Dairy & Poultry Science
- Department of Gynecology, Obstetrics & Reproductive health
- Department of Medicine
- Department of Microbiology & Public health
- Department of Pathobiology
- Department of Physiology & Pharmacology
- Department of Surgery & Radiology

=== 5. Faculty of Agricultural Economics and Rural Development ===
- Department of Agricultural economics
- Department of Agribusiness
- Department of Agricultural Finance & Cooperatives
- Department of Rural development
- Department of Statistics

=== 6. Faculty of Forestry and Environment ===
- Department of Forest Ecology
- Department of Silviculture
- Department of Wood Science and Technology
- Department of Forest Protection
- Department of Forest Policy and Management
- Department of Agroforestry and Environment
- Department of Natural Resource and Conservation
- Department of Remote Sensing and GIS
- Department of Environmental Hazard and Disaster Management

=== 7. Faculty of Agricultural and Bioresources Engineering ===
- Department of Farm Machinery and Precision Engineering
- Department of Irrigation and Water Management
- Department of Structures and Environmental Engineering
- Department of Computer Science and Information Technology
- Department of Food Engineering

== Library ==
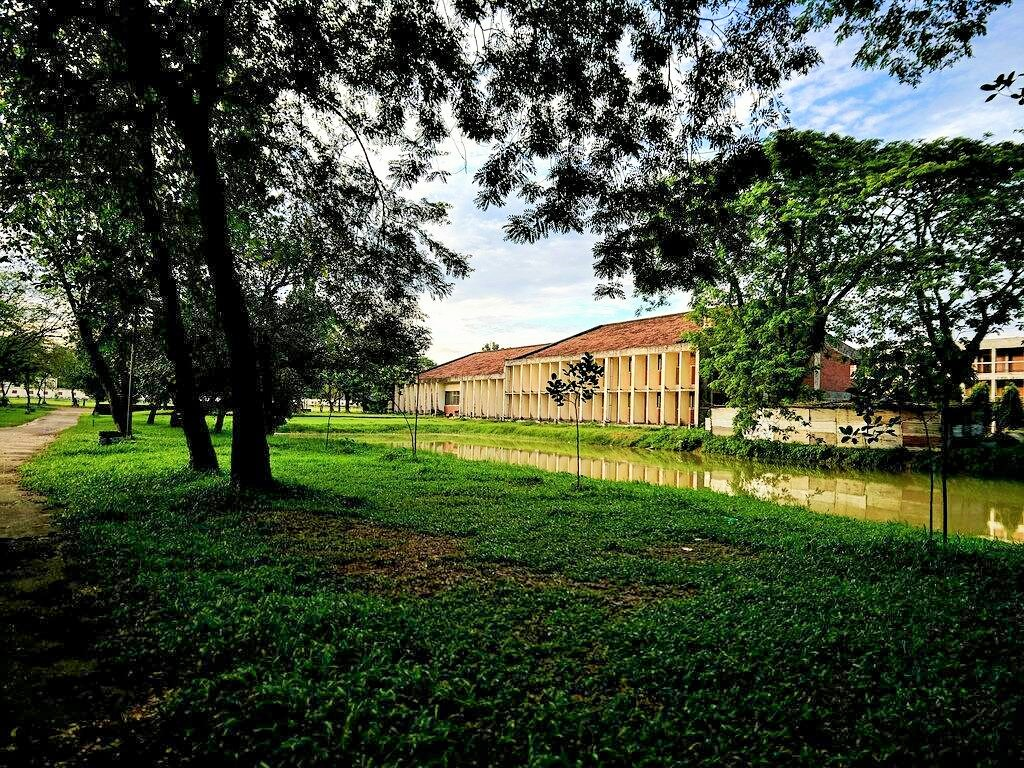
Library Building

The library of GAU is named as Yoshio Yamada Library. It has a separate two-storied building having 14,418 squire feet spaces. It was primarily established for postgraduate programs. However, with the inception of undergraduate programs, efforts are underway to equip the library with all necessary reference text books with multiple copies for all courses of undergraduate programs. It has a collection of around 21,800 books and more than 65,000 e-journals. The library is also regularly supplied with the journals, periodicals, bulletins, daily newspaper, magazines etc. The library is air conditioned with adequate sitting and reading facilities and an Audio-visual Room.

== Students dormitories ==
=== Boys halls ===
- Mawlana Bhashani Hall
- Shaheed Ahsanullah Master Hall (SAM Hall)
- Shaheed Tajuddin Ahmed Hall

=== Girls halls ===
- New Student Hall (Female)
- Begum Rukeya Hall
- Ila Mitra Hall

== Student clubs and organizations ==
Gazipur Agricultural University has more than a dozen student clubs, covering a wide range of interests such as arts and culture, science, and service.

== Admission ==
=== Undergraduate program ===
A new system of Cluster examination was introduced from the year 2019-2020 for seven public universities of Bangladesh which provide Education in Agricultural science. These are Bangabandhu Sheikh Mujibur Rahman Agricultural University, Bangladesh Agricultural University, Sher-e-Bangla Agricultural University, Chittagong Veterinary and Animal Sciences University, Sylhet Agricultural University, Khulna Agricultural University and Patuakhali Science and Technology University. The cluster system reduced students hardships and financial costs. The admission test is held on each campus but at a time with the same question.

=== Graduate program ===
The Faculty of Graduate studies offers MS and PhD degree in specialized disciplines of Agriculture. The Dean, faculty of Graduate Studies as academic executive of the faculty co-ordinates the academic activities of the university at graduate level. The faculty of graduate studies includes of 22 (twenty Two) academic departments, 1 (one) academic unit, 1 (one) institute and 2 (two) supporting departments. Each academic department/unit/institute has a Board of Studies (BOS) chaired by the head of the respective department/unit/institute. The Dean is assisted by and Additional Registrar for academic matters and Deputy Controller of Examinations for examination issues.

== Notable people ==
- Md. Tofazzal Islam, winner of the Bangladesh Academy of Sciences Gold Medal 2011.
