= Waste Concern =

Bangladeshi recycling organization

- Type: Private
- Industry: Waste management
- Founder: A.H.Md. Maqsood Sinha; Iftekhar Enayetullah
- Headquarters: Dhaka, Bangladesh
- Services: Solutions for waste management

Waste Concern is a Bangladeshi Social Business Enterprise (S.B.E) for waste recycling.

== About ==
Waste Concern was founded in 1996 with the motto "Waste is a Resource". It was established by A.H.Md. Maqsood Sinha, a professional architect-urban planner, and Iftekhar Enayetullah, a civil engineer-urban planner, and currently has 24 professional staffs and 8 consultants. list. The company started out as a decentralized community model for waste recycling to transform the solid waste into organic compost using low cost, low technology and labor-intensive method. It later grew into a Waste Concern Group, comprising both "For Profit" and "Not-for Profit" arms. The work of the group in Bangladesh has led to joint-partnerships with the United Nations Economic and Social Commission for Asia and Pacific (UNESCAP) in replicating the model within ten cities in Asia. As the composting plants are all simple, low cost and labor-intensive, they are suitable to the socio-economic and climatic condition of Bangladesh. The modest sales revenue and low pay-back period further make their model financially viable.

== Mechanism ==
In Dhaka, the team from Waste Concern collects rubbish for recycling. This waste is taken to several food processing centers that turn 100 tons of garbage daily into compost. This community-based composting (CBC), in which residents put their food scraps into large composting barrels that sit on concrete bases and can hold up to 400 pounds, has been copied in over 26 cities in Bangladesh. This composting eliminates greenhouse gases produced by rotting garbage, which prompted World Wide Recycling to invest $8 million into Waste Concern's new facilities.

== Strategy ==
=== Use science data ===
Door-to-door surveys and data analysis were used to come up with a business model to convert organic waste to compost. These data garnered were able to inform investors of the feasibility and sustainability of their business.

=== Establish community-run operations ===
The firm employs impoverished citizens to collect organic waste in the slums and send it to the processing centre. This involves creation of several small-scale enterprises in different neighbourhoods, which acts as part of a de-centralized waste management model. Their operations include house-to-house waste collection, composting of the collected waste by sending them to the composting plants and marketing of the compost and recyclable materials to interested buyers and businesses. According to the founders. this form of community-run operation establishes Waste Concern as an overarching social organisation that not only aims to empower its employees but also, increase their quality of life.

=== Explore new market opportunities ===
The concern uses its technology to help other companies in other industries solve their waste management problems. Initially, Waste Concern's business model was to market and sell compost to rural farmers. However, with potential market opportunities in the commercial sector and incentives to leverage on economic efficiency, the concern started to increase production, supplying compost to fertiliser companies. In addition, Waste Concern has been asked by a number of poultry farms to develop a poultry manure composting technique. By exporting its services and technologies, Waste Concern is able to leverage on its capability and explore new opportunities and has since attracted the attention of private fertiliser companies.

== Results ==
Since its inception, Waste Concern addresses the twin problems of waste accretion and land infertility by reducing waste and converting it into usable compost as fertilizers for horticulture and agriculture. From 2001 to 2006, Waste Concern has been able to reduce 17,000 tons of Green House gas emissions, generate employment for 986 urban poor, and save a landfill area of 33.12 acres with a depth of 1 metre. During the same period, they processed 124,400 tons of organic waste and produced 31,100 tons of compost. Their composing activities benefited 60,000 people in Dhaka and an additional 434,290 people from its replication in other parts of the country.

Currently, Waste Concern produces 7,500 tons of compost in Dhaka and 8,087 tons in other parts of Bangladesh each year. Furthermore, the technology used for composting can treat 30,000–35,000 tons of waste per year and reduces carbon emission by 20,000 tons of carbon dioxide per year. The project creates better paid and more hygiene jobs and hence, reduces the unemployment rate in Bangladesh. The project also provides organic alternative to fertilizers in a country where there are so few non-chemical ones. In addition, Waste Concern helps to save the environment through the promotion of recycling activities in the country. Furthermore, there is increased revenue generation through carbon co-financing and Clean Development Mechanism (CDM), which launched under the Kyoto Protocol, will create the world's first carbon trading based composting project.

== Problems ==
=== Corrosion ===
During the composting process, both sides of the composting barrel show signs of corrosion after a certain operating time due to the acids produced during the process of decomposition. Although the barrel is painted with anticorrosive paint, it could not withstand the intensity of the acids and hence, undergoes corrosive over time.

=== Working conditions ===
There have been concerns over the working conditions of the workers. The high chance of getting infections and diseases due to the high concentration of pathogenic micro-organisms coupled with the high risk of injuries and infections caused by objects such as fragments of broken glass, syringes, metallic and other rough objects contribute to undesirable working conditions. Although safety equipments have been given to the workers, they do not wear them all the time and hence, this contributes to higher risk of getting health ailments while working. Furthermore, there have been concerns over the water supply, which is in close distance to the composting piles. This leads to contamination and problems of workers using the contaminated water for personal use.
