= Jamia Arabia Imdadul Uloom =

Jamia Arabia Imdadul Uloom Faridabad Madrasah
- জামিয়া ফরিদাবাদ
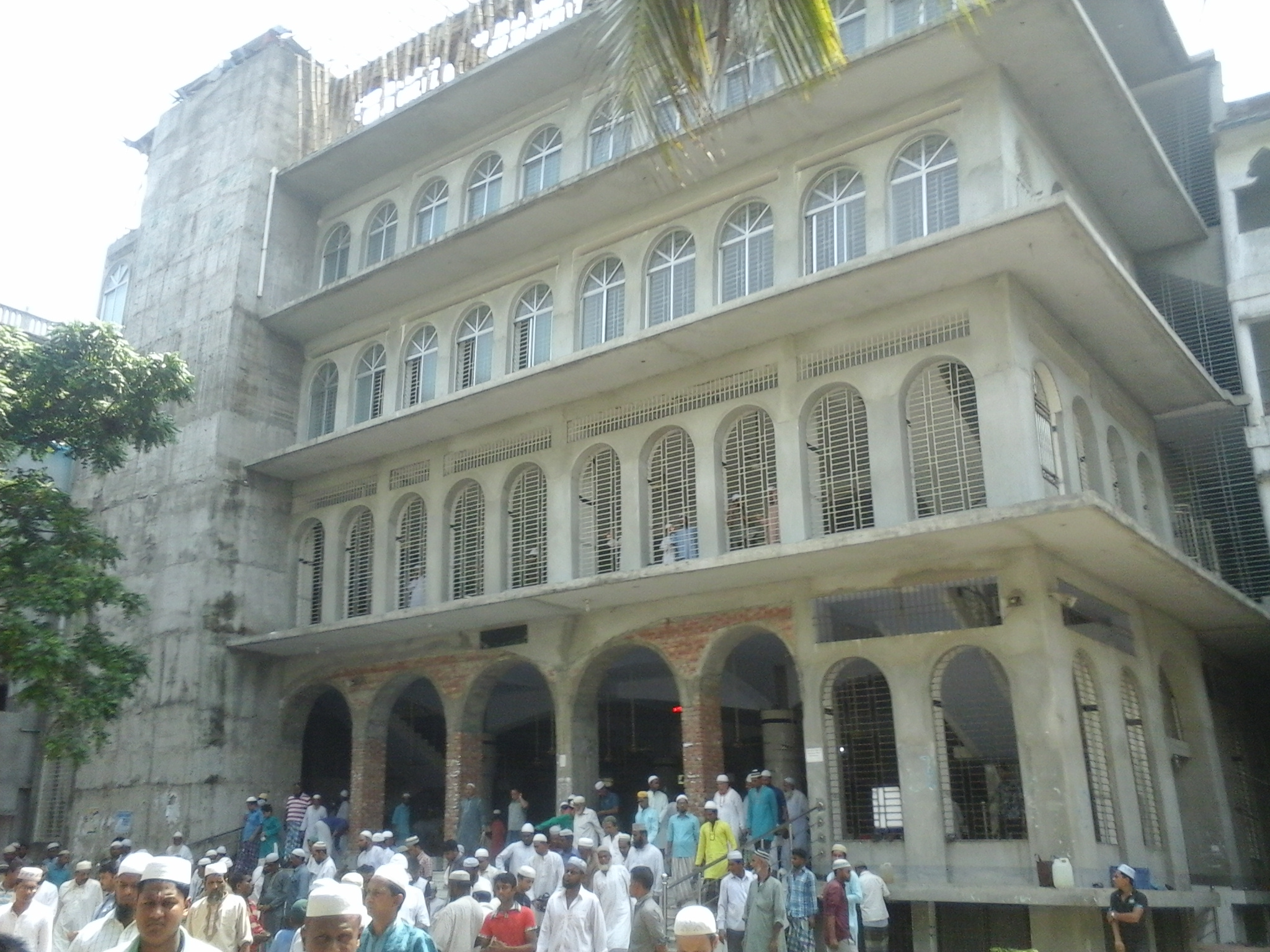
- Masjidul Bilal
- Former names: Jamia Arabia Imdadul Uloom Madrasah
- Type: Qawmi Madrasah
- Established: January 1956; 70 years ago
- Founders: Shamsul Haque Faridpuri
- Rector: Abdul Quddus
- Location: Gendaria Thana, Dhaka, Bangladesh; 23.6983°N 90.4221°E
- Language: Bengali, Arabic, English, Urdu
- Website: faridabadmadrasa.com

Jamia Arabia Imdadul Uloom Faridabad Madrasah (জামিয়া আরাবিয়া ইমদাদুল উলূম ফরিদাবাদ মাদ্রাসা) is a Qawmi Madrasah in Dhaka, Bangladesh. It is recognized as one of the leading Qawmi madrasahs in the country.

== History ==
The madrasah was founded in 1956 by Shamsul Haque Faridpuri. It was named after Haji Imdadullah Muhajir Makki. Shamsul Haque Faridpuri was the institution's first patron and trustee, while his contemporary, Muhammadullah Hafezzi Huzur, served as the first Muhtamim (principal). The headquarters of Befaqul Madarisil Arabia Bangladesh (BEFAQ) was based at this madrasah for about a decade after its establishment in 1978.

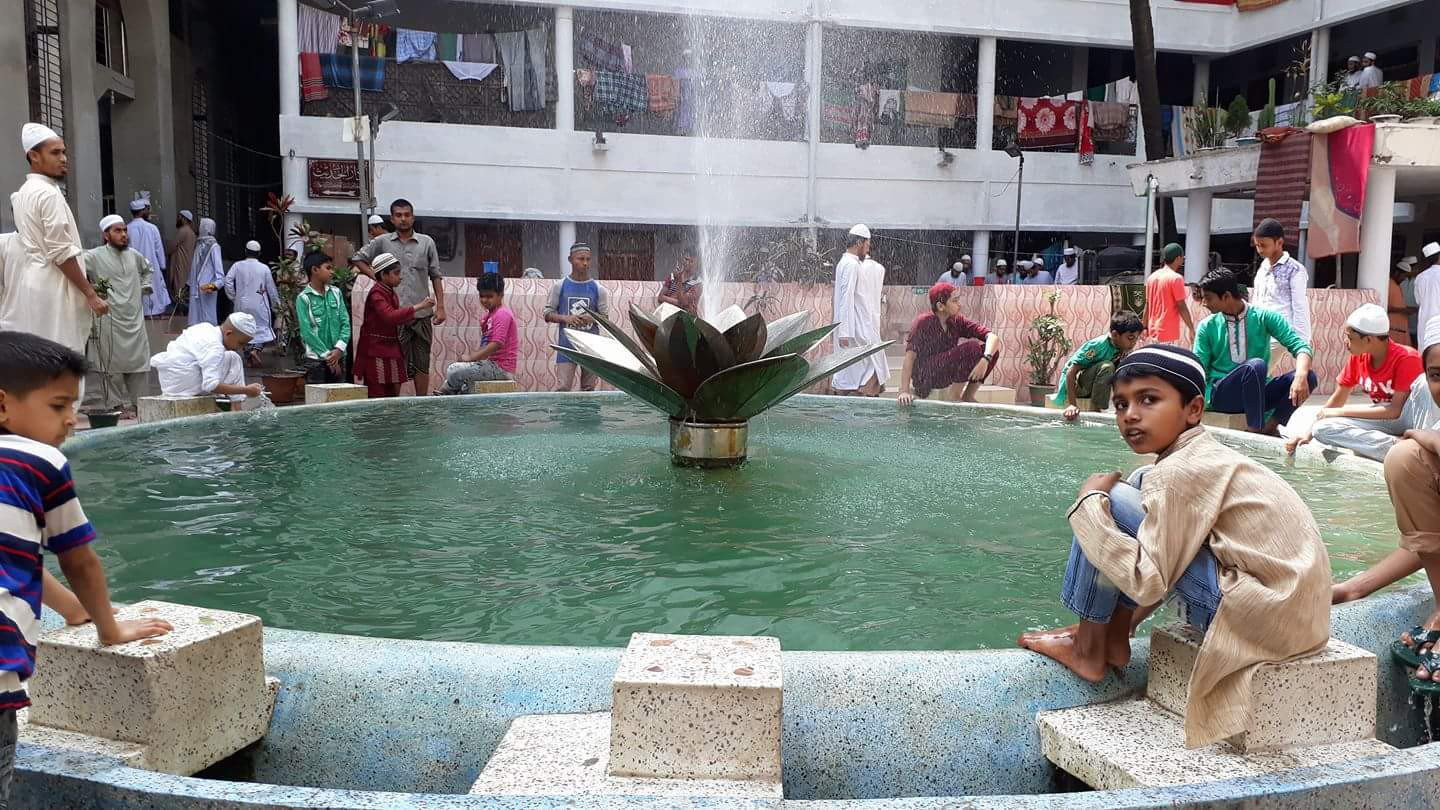
Dhaka faridabad madrasa

The madrasah publishes a monthly magazine called Masik Niamat. Originally founded by Shamsul Haque Faridpuri in 1937, its publication was discontinued in 1991 but resumed in 2013. The magazine's executive editor is Motiur Rahman.

During the 2020 general election, the madrasa was used as a polling station where Bangladesh Chhatra League leader Shahidul Islam Khan Riyad attacked journalists from Bangladesh Pratidin, The Business Standard, and Din Pratidin when they were talking to voters. After the death of Shah Ahmad Shafi, Amir of Hefazat-e-Islam Bangladesh, on 18 September 2020, his body was taken to the Madrasa. In 2021, the Dhaka Tribune reported that this was one of many Qawmi madrasas that stayed open despite the government order to close all educational institutions during the COVID-19 pandemic in Bangladesh.

The principal of the madrasa, Maulana Abdul Quddus, resigned from the Befaqul Madarisil Arabia Bangladesh, and Awami League government-supported clerics took control of the board.

=== Controversy ===
After listening to Ansarullah Bangla Team chief Mufti Muhammad Jasimuddin Rahmani, student of the madrasa Abdus Sabur joined Ansarullah Bangla Team and participated in the assassination of Avijit Roy.

Mezbah Uddin murdered Arif Raihan Dwip, a student of Bangladesh University of Engineering and Technology, for being critical of Islam following the advice of Muktamim Mufti Abu Syeed, mawlana of Jamia Arabia Imdadul Uloom Faridabad.

An alumnus and teacher of the madrasah, Ikramul Haque, alias Milan, was detained for being a member of the Al Qaeda in the Indian Subcontinent in July 2023 by Counter Terrorism and Transnational Crime. He was also wanted by the Indian police. The Daily Star reported that he, his wife, and their baby were victims of enforced disappearance.

== Alumni and faculty ==
- Shamsuddin Qasemi
- Ishaq Faridi
