= Satya Prasad Majumder =

Bangladeshi university official

- সত্য প্রসাদ মজুমদার

14th Vice-Chancellor of Bangladesh University of Engineering and Technology
- In office 25 June 2020 – 18 August 2024
- Preceded by: Saiful Islam
- Succeeded by: A. B. M. Badruzzaman

Personal details
- Education: Indian Institute of Technology Kharagpur (PhD); Bangladesh University of Engineering and Technology (BSc)
- Occupation: University administrator, professor

Satya Prasad Majumder is a Bangladeshi academic. He served as 14th vice-chancellor of Bangladesh University of Engineering and Technology during 2020–2024.

== Education ==
Majumder attended Chandpur Government College. He completed his B.Sc. in electrical and electronic engineering in 1981 from Bangladesh University of Engineering and Technology, and later joined as a faculty there. He was awarded the talent pool scholarship during his 4 years of honors for his excellent achievements as a student. He also completed his M.Sc. there in 1985, where his research was mainly focused on Microprocessor controlled telephone branch exchange. In 1987, he was awarded scholarship by the Government of India to enroll as a PhD student at the Indian institute of Technology (IIT), Kharagpur and continue his research work in fiber optics at the Centre for Research and Training in radar and communications situated on that university. He also received funding from Italian National Research Council under Parma University to support his PhD on telecommunication project.

== Career ==
After 1991, Majumder rejoined Bangladesh University of Engineering and Technology and continued to serve it by taking various responsibilities. He particularly taught courses on telecommunications, namely optical communications, analog and digital electronics, advanced electronics, digital communications, satellite communications, electrical circuits and systems, instrumentation & control systems, power systems analysis, electrical machines, laser theory, telecommunication engineering, advanced telecommunication engineering, coding and information theory.

Aside from teaching, Majumder also handled different administrative responsibilities. He was the head of the EEE Department in two consecutive years from June 2006 to May 2008. He has also completed his term as the director of student welfare in 2018. He is currently the chairman in Communication Society of IEEE Bangladesh Section.

Majumder served as faculty in many different private and public universities of Bangladesh, like - Presidency University, Bangladesh Army University of Science and Tech (BAUST), Military Institution of Science and Technology, Ranada Prasad Shaha University (RPSU) to name some few. He has also worked as a visiting faculty of different universities abroad, like- Multimedia University, Malaysia, Gunma University, Japan, University of Parma, Italy, etc.

Majumder has authored more than 200 publications and also supervised more than 100 thesis and dissertations in different field of optics, especially in Optoelectronics & Photonics, Optical Fiber Communication Systems, Optical Networks, Solution propagation, Satellite Communications, Mobile and Infrared communications, etc. On 18 August 2024, he stepped down from his position.

== Consultancy ==
As one of the early pioneer in optoelectronics of Bangladesh, Majumder did some consultancy works in institutes like- Asia IT&C Program, South Asian Association for Regional Cooperations (SAARC) & Dhaka Chamber of Commerce (DCC). He is currently serving as one of the board of directors in Bangladesh Telecommunication Company Limited (BTCL), under the Bangladesh government.
