= Presidency University =

Presidency University may refer to:

- Presidency University, Kolkata
- Presidency University, Bangalore
- Presidency University, Bangladesh

== See also ==
- Presidency College (disambiguation)
