= Murder of Sabekun Nahar Sony =

2002 murder in Dhaka, Bangladesh

- Part of Violence by Bangladesh Jatiotabadi Chhatra Dal
- Location: BUET, Dhaka, Bangladesh
- Date: 8 June 2002; 24 years
- Victim: Sabekun Nahar Sonny

The Murder of Sabekun Nahar Sony refers to the 8 June 2002 killing of a chemical engineering student at the Bangladesh University of Engineering and Technology (BUET). She was fatally shot after being caught in the crossfire of a gunfight between rival factions of the Bangladesh Jatiotabadi Chatra Dal.

== Background ==
Bangladesh Jatiotabadi Chatra Dal is the student wing of the Bangladesh Nationalist Party.

=== Sabekun Nahar Sonny ===
Sonny's father was Habibur Rahman Bhuiyan (died 2023). She was a second-year student of the department of chemical engineering of the Bangladesh University of Engineering and Technology (BUET).

== Incident ==
Two factions of the Bangladesh Jatiotabadi Chatra Dal, student wing of the governing Bangladesh Nationalist Party, were engaged in a gunfight on the BUET campus. She was shot in the crossfire and died. She was standing in front of Ahsanullah Hall of the university. The two sides were fighting over tender. One fraction was led by Mokammel Hayat Khan, president of the campus unit of Bangladesh Jatiotabadi Chatra Dal, and the other fraction was led by Mushfique Uddin Tagar, leader of the SM Hall of the Chatra Dal.

There were protests across Bangladesh following her death.

== Trial ==
Sonny's father accused the Bangladesh Nationalist Party government, police and the BUET administration of supporting the accused.

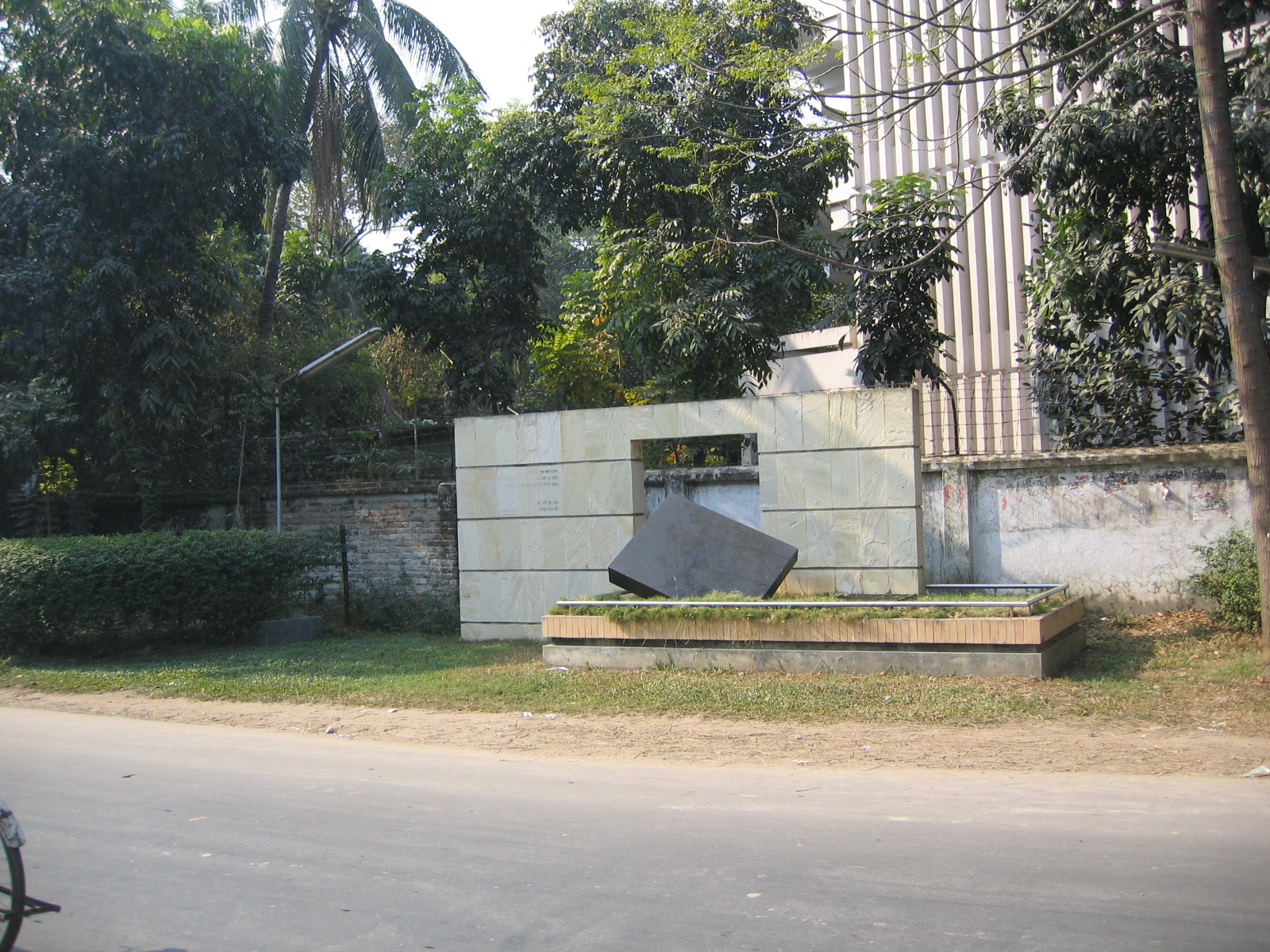
Sabekun Nahar Sonny Memorial Sculpture on the BUET campus

The trial for the murder case took place in the Speedy Trial Tribunal-1 under judge Shahed Noor Uddin. On 29 June 2003, the court sentenced three to death and five to life imprisonment.

In March 2006 Bangladesh High Court reduced the death sentences to life sentences to three accused fugitives in the murder case on appeal. Four convicts in the case are in jail while two are absconding. Two of the convicts sentenced to life imprisonment were acquitted.

=== Legacy ===
The university campus observes 8 June at the anti-terrorism day. On 4 November 2021, the only female dormitory of the BUET was named Sabequn Nahar Sony Hall.

The Daily Star lamented that following the murder of Abrar Fahad his family was given compensation but that was not the case after the Murder of Arif Raihan Dwip and death of Sabekun Nahar Sonny. It also noted the sole accused in the death of Arif Raihan Dwip was not arrested and two accused in the death of Sabekun Nahar Sonny had not been detained in 20 years. Her death was one of the reasons cited for students opposing politics on the BUET campus.
