= Mohamed Rafiquzzaman =

Computer scientist, electrical engineer

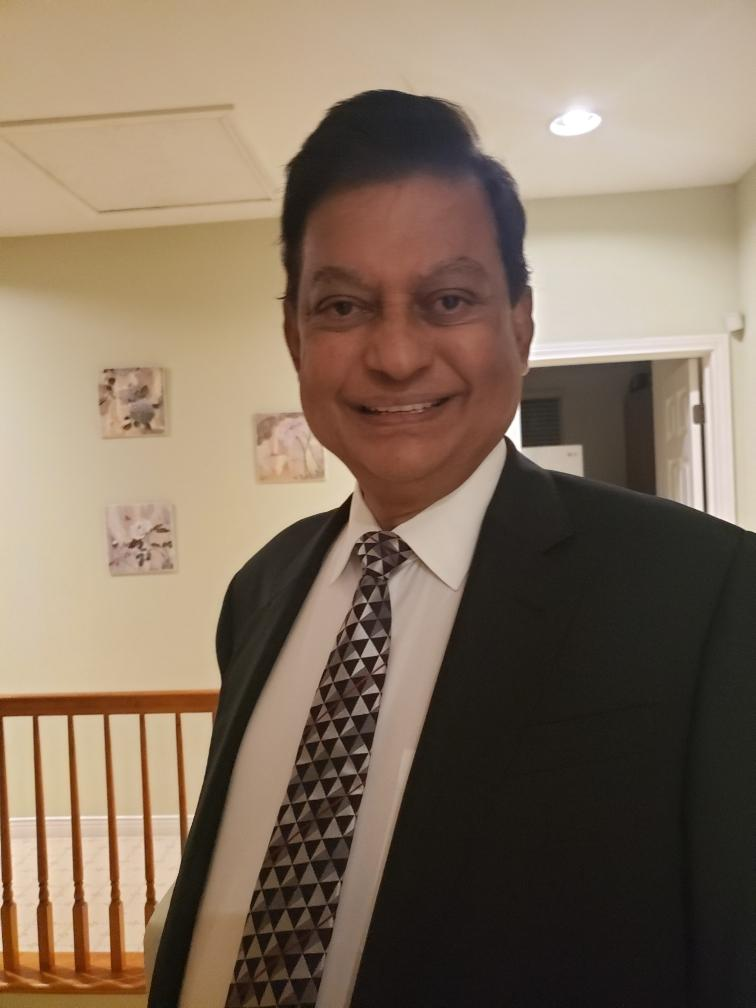
- Occupations: Computer scientist, electrical engineer, academic and author

Academic background
- Education: B.Sc., Electrical Engineering; M.A.Sc, Electrical Engineering; Ph.D., Electrical Engineering
- Alma mater: Bangladesh University of Engineering and Technology (BUET); University of Windsor, Canada

Academic work
- Institutions: California State Polytechnic University, Pomona; University of Southern California

Mohamed Rafiquzzaman is a computer scientist, electrical engineer, academic and author. He is a professor of Electrical and Computer Engineering at California State Polytechnic University, Pomona, and a Founder and President of Rafi Systems Inc., California a manufacturer of Intraocular (Cataract) lenses.

Rafiquzzaman has published over 40 papers. He has focused his research on microprocessor and microcontroller-based applications. He has also authored 18 books on digital logic, microcontrollers, and microprocessors, which have been translated into Russian, Chinese, and Spanish.

Rafiquzzaman is a chartered member of the 'Sixth Ring' of the US Olympic committee, and served as a manager of the Olympic Swimming, Diving and Synchronized Swimming events in Los Angeles in 1984. He has also served as a co-chair of The President's Forum for the state of California, as an advisor to the US House Policy Committee's Technology Board, and as Computer advisor to the President of Bangladesh. From 2004 till 2008, he was a member of Governor Arnold Schwarzenegger's economic recovery team for California.

== Education ==
Rafiquzzaman received his bachelor's degree in Electrical Engineering from Bangladesh University of Engineering and Technology (BUET) in 1969. He then moved to Canada and earned his Master's and Doctoral Degree from University of Windsor in 1972 and 1974, respectively.

== Career ==
Rafiquzzaman is a professor of Electrical and Computer Engineering at California State Polytechnic University, Pomona since 1978. Along with this appointment, he also served as adjunct professor of Electrical Engineering at University of Southern California from 1982 till 1987. In 1985, he was appointed as a Chair of Electrical and Computer Engineering Department at California State Polytechnic University.

In the 1970s, he worked for ESSO (EXXON) and Bell Northern Research. During the 1980s, he held appointment as Vice President of New Bedford Panaromex Corporation, and was also involved in the Space Shuttle project, and designing microprocessor-based Airport Remote Maintenance system for Federal Aviation Administration (FAA). He is the Founder and President of Rafi Systems Inc. since 1989.

== Research ==
Rafiquzzaman has worked extensively on microprocessor and microcontroller-based applications. He has authored 18 books on digital logic, microcontrollers, and microprocessors which have been translated into Russian, Chinese, and Spanish.

In his book entitled Preparing for an Outstanding Career in Computers, Rafiquzzaman has focused on the principles and basic tools to design typical digital systems such as microcomputers. He has also studied digital logic, computer architecture, and microprocessor-based system design. He based his book upon his previous book entitled Fundamentals of Digital Logic and Microcomputer Design.

Rafiquzzaman has authored a book entitled Fundamentals of Digital Logic and Microcomputer Design, currently in its 5th edition, and discussed computer design at three levels: the device level, the logic level, and the system level. He has also focused his book on system design features regarding popular microprocessors from Intel and Motorola, microcomputer organization, programming concepts, and future plans in context of microprocessor development.

Rafiquzzaman authored Fundamentals of Digital Logic and Microcontrollers in 2014, which focuses on basic concepts regarding CPLDs and FPGAs. In his book, he has provided a tutorial in terms of compiling and debugging a C-Program using the MPLAB.

== Awards and honors ==
- 1984 - Certificate of Appreciation for extraordinary Service, California State Polytechnic University

== Selected books ==
- Preparing for an Outstanding Career in Computers (2002) ISBN 9780966498042
- Fundamentals of Digital Logic and Microcomputer Design, 5th Edition (2005) ISBN 9780471727842
- Microprocessor Theory and Applications with 68000/68020 and Pentium (2008) ISBN 9780470380314
- Fundamentals of Digital Logic and Microcontrollers (2014) ISBN 9781118969304
- Microcontroller Theory and Applications with the PIC18F, 2nd Edition (2018) ISBN 9781119448419
