= Mohammed Abu Naser =

2nd Vice-Chancellor of Bangladesh University of Engineering and Technology
- In office 16 March 1970 – 25 April 1975
- Preceded by: M. A. Rashid
- Succeeded by: Wahiduddin Ahmed

Personal details
- Born: April 2, 1921 Damla village, Sreenagar Upazila, Munshiganj District, British India
- Died: May 12, 2004 (aged 83)
- Awards: Ekushey Padak

Mohammed Abu Naser (Bengali: মোহাম্মদ আবু নাসের; 2 April 1921 – 12 May 2004) was a Bangladeshi educator. He was the 2nd vice-chancellor of Bangladesh University of Engineering and Technology (BUET). He received the Ekushey Padak, one of the highest civilian awards in Bangladesh.

== Early life and education ==
Naser was born in Munshiganj District in erstwhile East Pakistan to M. Ismail Ali Khan and Abida Begum. He began his early education at the Kazir Pagla A. T. Institution at Lohajang Upazila in Munshiganj. In 1937, he passed the Matriculation Examination in the First Division. He completed the Intermediate Examination from the B. M. College, Barisal. He received the B.Sc. (Hons.) and M.Sc. degrees in chemistry from the University of Dhaka, in 1942 and 1943, respectively. Then he went to the Bengal Engineering College at Shibpur, West Bengal, to study chemical engineering.

He got a scholarship to study for his M.S. in chemical engineering at Johns Hopkins University in Baltimore. This was a notable achievement for him to be selected for such a scholarship in undivided India. In 1962 he again went to the United States for his Ph.D. He completed his Ph.D. in four years, of which he spent about two years at Columbia University, and then he went to Texas A&M University to complete the rest of his Ph.D. He went to London under a fellowship from the Nuffield Foundation to study for a year at the University of London In 1955.

== Career ==
After returning to East Pakistan, Naser first joined the Industries Ministry and then joined the Directorate of Technical Education. After a short while he joined the faculty at Ahsanullah Engineering College (later became BUET). In 1970, he became the vice-chancellor of BUET and continued holding his position after the liberation of Bangladesh. Naser is credited for the first convocation of BUET which was held in 1973. He became the chairman of the University Grants Commission in 1975. He retired from this position in 1980. He was a professor emeritus of chemical engineering in BUET until his death.

== Achievements ==
Naser received the Ekushey Padak in 1987. The Dr M. A. Naser Trust Fund is introduced at BUET to offer scholarships for poor and meritorious students of the university.

== Death and legacy ==
Naser died on 12 May 2004. He had four children and eight grandchildren. Khan H. Zahid, the second son, is currently the chief economist and vice president of Riyad Bank.
