= Muslehuddin Ahmad =

Bangladeshi diplomat and academic

- Born: 1931 or 1932
- Died: September 10, 2012 (aged 80); Dhaka, Bangladesh
- Occupations: diplomat, university administrator
- Spouse: Shaista Ahmad
- Children: Junaid Ahmad, Javed Muneer Ahmad and Seema Ahmad

Muslehuddin Ahmad (Bengali: মুসলেহুদ্দিন আহমদ; 1931/1932 – 10 September 2022) was a Bangladeshi diplomat and university administrator. He was the founder of North South University, the first private university in Bangladesh and served as its first vice-chancellor. He was the ambassador of Bangladesh to France and Romania.

== Career ==
Ahmad joined the government service in 1956 through Central Superior Services.

During the Bangladesh Liberation War in 1971, he defected from the then Pakistan embassy in France. He later returned to Dhaka and took over Biman Bangladesh Airlines to lead the airline as its first and only chairman. During 1985–86, he served as the ambassador of Bangladesh to Romania. He founded North South University in 1992 and served as the first vice-chancellor of the university. Later in 2004, he served as the vice-chancellor of Presidency University, Bangladesh.

He authored a book, "Promised Land", on the Israeli–Palestinian conflict.

== Personal life ==
Ahmad was married to Shaista Ahmad who was a professor of zoology at Dhaka College and Titumir College and a founder general member at North South University. Together they had three children, Junaid Ahmad (the country director of World Bank for India, as of September 2016) Javed Muneer Ahmad who is the CEO of Aprosoft, Inc., and Seema Ahmad who is the founder President of EZTextocalls, LLC. and PARIS (Political Activism, Relief and Institutional Startups) at www.parisforjustice.org and also works as a political organizer at Community Change Action.

Ahmad suffered a stroke and had been in a coma since 1 July 2012. He died on September 10 at the Square Hospital in Dhaka.

== Works ==
Books

- The Tale of the first private university of Bangladesh North South University (2004)
- Promised Land (2010)

Newspaper articles

- Ahmad, Muslehuddin (14 May 2010). "Member of Parliament Order?". The Daily Star.
- Ahmad, Muslehuddin (14 January 2009). "True change". The Daily Star.
- Ahmad, Muslehuddin (7 July 2008). "New Bangladesh needs new leadership". The Daily Star.
- Ahmad, Muslehuddin (24 May 2008). "Country and democracy more important than individuals". The Daily Star.
- Ahmad Muslehuddin (27 November 2006). "The West's problem with the veil". The Daily Star.
- Ahmad, Muslehuddin (5 March 2004). "Move to ban gay marriages deserves appreciation". The Daily Star.
- Ahmad, Muslehuddin (16 October 2003). "Only possession of nuclear weapon can stop unilateral attacks!". The Daily Star.
