= A. B. M. Badruzzaman =

Bangladeshi academic and VC of BUET

- আবু বোরহান মোহাম্মদ বদরুজ্জামান

15th Vice-Chancellor of Bangladesh University of Engineering and Technology
- In office 12 September 2024 – 14 May 2026
- Chancellor: Mohammed Shahabuddin
- Preceded by: Satya Prasad Majumder
- Succeeded by: Eqramul Hoque

Personal details
- Born: Abu Borhan Mohammad Badruzzaman
- Education: Bangladesh University of Engineering and Technology; University of Virginia

Abu Borhan Mohammad Badruzzaman is a Bangladeshi academic who has been the 15th vice-chancellor of Bangladesh University of Engineering and Technology.

== Education ==
Badruzzaman earned his bachelor's and master's degrees in civil engineering from Bangladesh University of Engineering and Technology in 1984 and 1987 respectively. He then earned his PhD in environmental engineering from the University of Virginia, in Charlottesville, Virginia in 1992.

== Controversy ==
During his tenure as Vice-Chancellor, several alumni and former students raised concerns regarding the transparency of lecturer recruitment at Bangladesh University of Engineering and Technology (BUET).According to reports published in Daily Amardesh, allegations were made that appointments in certain departments did not strictly follow merit rankings, leading to claims of nepotism. University authorities, however, stated that the recruitment process was conducted in accordance with institutional procedures and denied any irregularities.
