= Junaid Ahmad =

Bangladeshi economist

World Bank country director for India
- Incumbent
- Assumed office 1 September 2016
- Preceded by: Onno Ruhl

Personal details
- Born: Junaid Kamal Ahmad
- Spouse: Samia Mahbub Ahmad
- Parents: Muslehuddin Ahmad (father); Shaista Ahmad (mother)
- Education: Brown University; Harvard University; Stanford University
- Occupation: economist, administrator

Junaid Kamal Ahmad is a Bangladeshi economist serving as the current World Bank country director for India.

== Education ==
Ahmad earned his bachelor's in economics from Brown University and master's in public administration from Harvard University. He obtained his Ph.D. in applied economics from Stanford University.

== Career ==
Ahmad joined World Bank in 1991 and worked on infrastructure development in Africa and Eastern Europe. He spent 10 years as the deputy resident representative and principal economist in Johannesburg. He then worked as regional team leader of the Water and Sanitation Program in New Delhi during 2000–2005. During 2004–2008, he was the sector manager for Social Development in South Asia Region and next for Urban Water and Sanitation. He was the director for Sustainable Development in the Middle East and North Africa Region during 2012–2014. He served as the Chief of Staff to the World Bank Group President Jim Yong Kim since January 2016.

On September 1, 2016, he started serving as the country director for the World Bank in India replacing Onno Ruhl.
