= Presidency College =

Presidency College may refer to:

- Presidency College, Bangalore
- Presidency University, Bengaluru
- Presidency College, Chennai, India
- Presidency University, Kolkata, India
- Presidency College, Motbung

== See also ==
- Presidency University (disambiguation)
