= Eqramul Hoque =

16th Vice-Chancellor of Bangladesh University of Engineering and Technology
- Incumbent
- Assumed office 14 May 2026
- Preceded by: A. B. M. Badruzzaman

Eqramul Hoque is a Bangladeshi academic who has been the 16th and current vice-chancellor of Bangladesh University of Engineering and Technology since 14 May 2026.
