= M. A. Rashid =

Bangladeshi educator (1919–1981)

- এম. এ. রশীদ

1st Vice-Chancellor of Bangladesh University of Engineering and Technology
- In office June 1, 1962 – March 16, 1970
- Preceded by: Post established
- Succeeded by: M. A. Naser

Personal details
- Born: January 16, 1919 Bogadubi village, Habiganj District, Bengal Presidency, British India
- Died: November 6, 1981 (aged 62) Dhaka, Bangladesh
- Education: Bengal Engineering College; Carnegie Institute of Technology
- Occupation: Educator

M. A. Rashid (January 16, 1919 – November 6, 1981) was a Bangladeshi educator. He served as the 1st vice-chancellor of Bangladesh University of Engineering and Technology during 1962–1970. He was awarded Independence Day Award in 1982 by the Government of Bangladesh.

== Early life and education ==
Rashid was born in Bogadubi, Chunarughat. He passed matriculation exam from Habiganj Govt. High School and intermediate exam from Sylhet Murari Chand College in 1936 and 1938 respectively. In 1942, he completed his bachelor's in civil engineering from Bengal Engineering College (later Indian Institute of Engineering Science and Technology, Shibpur) at Shibpur in West Bengal.

He served as an assistant engineer in the Public Works Department of the Assam government during 1942–1945. With an Indian government scholarship, he earned his master's degree and DSc degrees in civil engineering from the Carnegie Institute of Technology (later Carnegie Mellon University) in Pittsburgh, Pennsylvania.

== First doctorate degree in East Bengal ==
He was the first in East Bengal to have a doctorate degree in engineering.

== Career ==
After returning from the United States in 1948 Rashid joined the Ahsanullah Engineering College (later Bangladesh University of Engineering and Technology) in Dhaka as an assistant professor He became a professor in 1952 and the first Bengali principal of the college in 1954.

In 1958, he became a member of the Education Commission of Pakistan. After the independence of Bangladesh, he became a member of the National Pay Commission, Industrial Workers Wages Commission and President's Council of Advisors and was put in charge of the Ministry of Works in 1975.

== Personal life ==
Rashid married Tajunnessa Khatun in 1941.

== Death and legacy ==
On October 28, 1981, Rashid was severely injured in a car accident on his way from Pabna to Bogra. He was admitted to P.G. Hospital (Institute of Postgraduate Medicine and Research). He died on the afternoon of November 6, 1981.

Dr M. A. Rashid Hall, a students' residential hall of the BUET is named after him.

== Awards ==
- Slater Memorial Gold Medal (1941)
- Tate Memorial Medal (1941)
- Trevor Memorial Prize and Gold Medal (1942)
- Sitara-I-Pakistan (1966)
- Independence Day Award (1982)
