= Chandpur Government College =

College in Chandpur, Bangladesh

Coordinates: 23°13′44.9″N 90°39′36.1″E

- চাঁদপুর সরকারি কলেজ
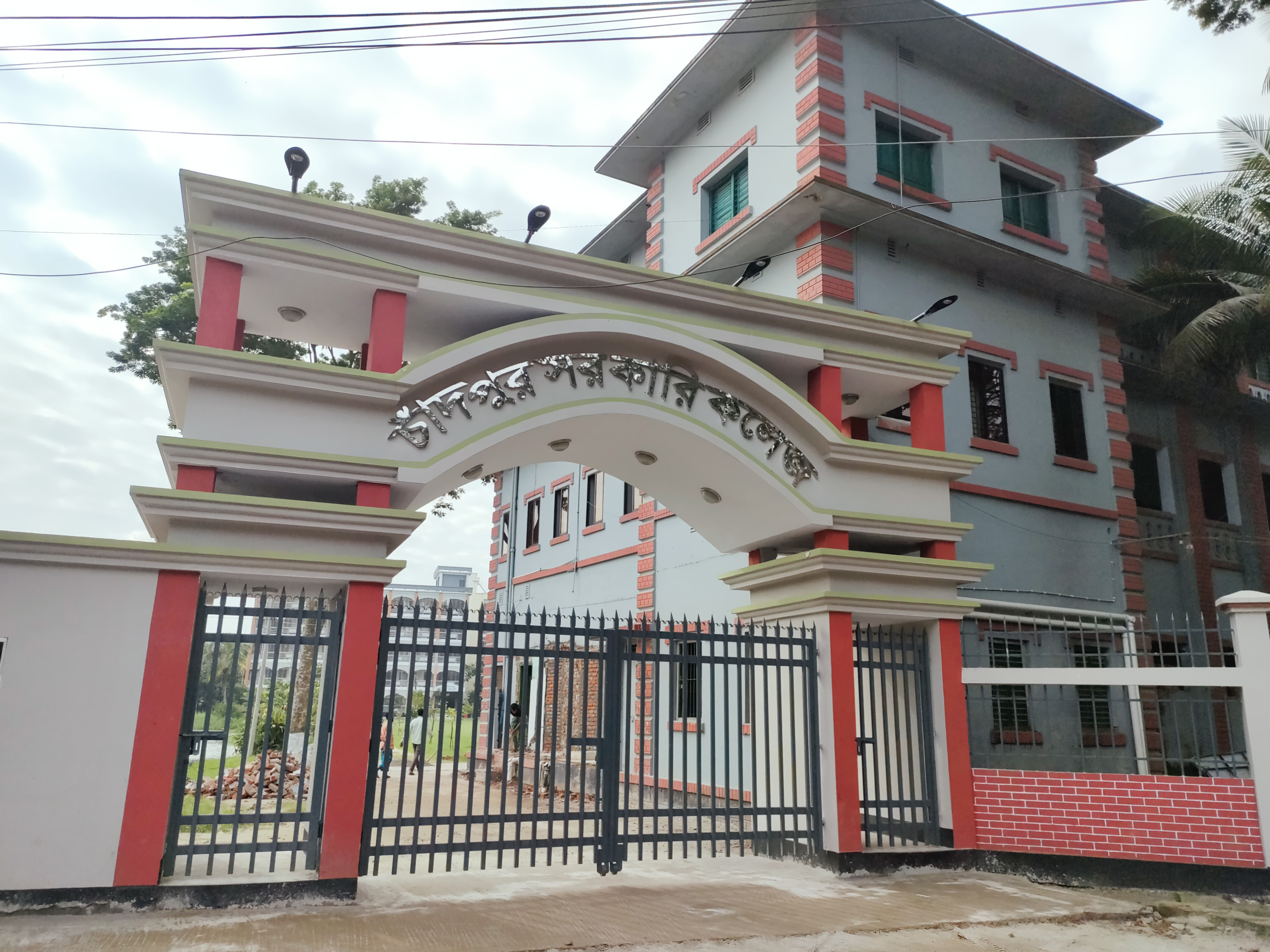
- Former name: Chandpur College
- Motto: শিক্ষা ইমান সেবা
- Motto in English: Education Faith Service
- Type: Public
- Established: 15 June 1946
- Founder: Huseyn Shaheed Suhrawardy
- Affiliations: National University
- Chancellor: President Mirza Fakhrul Islam Alamgir
- Vice-Chancellor: A. S. M. Amanullah
- Principal: A.K.M Abdul Mannan
- Students: 14,000
- Location: Chandpur Sadar, Chandpur, Bangladesh
- Campus: Urban
- Colors
- Website: chandpurcollege.edu.bd

Chandpur Government College (Bengali: চাঁদপুর সরকারি কলেজ) is a public college in Chandpur, Bangladesh and is one of the oldest colleges in Chandpur as well as in Chittagong Division. The college offers higher secondary education as well as Honours degree and master's degree programs, which are affiliated with the National University of Bangladesh.

== History ==
The foundation stone of Chandpur College was laid on 15 June 1946 by Huseyn Shaheed Suhrawardy, Prime Minister of undivided Bengal.

== Campus ==
=== Academic buildings ===
There are five academic buildings:

- Main Building (Administrative Building)
- Shaheed Raju Building
- Academic Building-1
- Academic Building-2
- Academic Building-3

=== Library ===
The library is situated in main building of the college. It has a collection around 24,000 books.

=== Residential student halls ===
There are three residential halls:

- Shaheed Zia Hostel (boys)
- Sher-e-Bangla Hostel (boys)
- Sheikh Hasina Girl's Hostel

=== Mosque ===
There is a mosque in the college campus.

== Academics ==
Chandpur Government College offers HSC, four years Honours, Degree and one year Masters course in various majors.

=== HSC level ===
- Science
- Business Studies
- Humanities

=== Honours and Masters level ===
- Department of Accounting
- Department of Management
- Department of Economics
- Department of English
- Department of Bangla
- Department of Political Science
- Department of Social Work
- Department of History
- Department of Islamic Studies
- Department of Islamic History and Culture
- Department of Philosophy
- Department of Geography
- Department of Physics
- Department of Chemistry
- Department of Mathematics
- Department of Zoology
- Department of Botany

== Notable alumni ==
- Mizanur Rahman Chowdhury, Prime Minister of Bangladesh (1986-1988)
- Goutam Buddha Das, agricultural scientist and Ekushey Padak awardee
- Humayun Faridi, actor and drama organizer
- Satya Prasad Majumder, electrical engineer and vice chancellor of Bangladesh University of Engineering and Technology
- Samir Kumar Saha, microbiologist and Ekushey Padak awardee
