= Murder of Arif Raihan Dwip =

2013 murder in Bangladesh

- Part of Violence of Islami Chhatra Shibir (Suspected)
- Victim: Arif Raihan Dwip

Murder of Arif Raihan Dwip refers to the murder of Bangladesh University of Engineering and Technology student Arif Raihan Dwip by a "religious extremist".

== Background ==
Arif Raihan Dwip was a third year student of mechanical engineering at the Bangladesh University of Engineering and Technology (BUET). He lived in the Nazrul Islam Hall of the BUET. He was a convenor committee member of the Bangladesh Chhatra League. He was involved in the Shahbagh movement supporting trial of those accused of war crimes in the Bangladesh Liberation War. He was accused of verbally abusing an imam of a mosque at the University of Dhaka for supplying food to Bangladesh Hefajat-e Islam rally on 5 April. Threats were issued against Dwip on the Facebook group Buetian.

== Incident ==
Dwip was stabbed on 9 April 2013 in the Nazrul Islam Hall of the BUET. He received treatment under neurosurgeon Pijush Kanti Mitra at Dhaka Medical College Hospital and later was shifted to Square Hospital. Dwip died at 3:30 am on 2 July at Square Hospital. Bangladesh Chhatra League blamed the murder on Bangladesh Jamaat-e-Islami and Islami Chhatra Shibir.

== Aftermath ==
Dwip's brother filed a case following which the police arrested Mezbah Uddin. BUET created a three men investigation committee. Students of the university boycotted classes demanding punishment of those involved in the attack on Dwip. They submitted their demands to vice-chancellor S. M. Nazrul Islam. They resumed classes on 21 April after the government of Bangladesh said they would form an investagion committee of the Ministry of Home Affairs .

Another student of BUET and Gonojagoron Mancho, Tonmoy Ahmed Moon, was stabbed on 12 August in Gaibandha District by Bangladesh Islami Chhatra Shibir activists.

Mezbah Uddin was a fourth year student of BUET who attacked Dwip after being influenced by a radical preacher. He was detained from Dr MA Rashid Hall and confessed to detectives. According to detectives, he was communicating with Mufti Jasimuddin Rahmani. He was released on bail and the trial never proceeded. Dwip's father, Sk Ali Azam, requested help from Prime Minister Sheikh Hasina for his trial.

On 2 July 2024, his death anniversary was marked at BUET. His friends and family expressed resentment over the lack of verdict in his murder case. They alleged Bangladesh Islami Chhatra Shibir, Basherkell, and Hizb ut-Tahrir Bangladesh were glorifying the accused murder while attacking Dwip and calling him an "enemy of Islam".

Mufti Jasimuddin Rahmani was released on bail by the Bangladesh Interim government, led by Muhammad Yunus in August 2024.
