= Presidency University (Bangladesh) =

Private university in Dhaka, Bangladesh

- প্রেসিডেন্সি ইউনিভার্সিটি
- Other name: PU
- Motto: Sapientia et scientia
- Motto in English: Wisdom and Knowledge
- Type: Private
- Established: 21 July 2003
- Affiliations: University Grants Commission of Bangladesh
- Vice-Chancellor: Md. Abdul Mannan Chowdhury
- Academic staff: 135
- Students: 3000
- Undergraduates: 2000
- Postgraduates: 1000
- Location: House 11/A, Road 92, Gulshan-2, Dhaka-1212, Bangladesh; 23.7964°N 90.417338°E
- Campus: Urban
- Website: pu.edu.bd

Presidency University (Bengali: প্রেসিডেন্সি ইউনিভার্সিটি) is a private research university with a campus in Gulshan, Dhaka, Bangladesh. Presidency University has four schools containing eight departments with a strong emphasis on research-based education. The Gulshan campus was established in 2003.

== History ==
The Presidency University Foundation, a group of 30 teachers, leaders of business and industry, and retired government officers, came together and petitioned the government for a permit to establish and operate Presidency University. On 21 July 2003, the Ministry of Education (MoE) of the government of Bangladesh, in keeping with the Private University Act 1992, authorized the establishment and operation of Presidency University. Thereafter, Presidency University opened its door to students in September 2003.

The principal sponsor of Presidency University is Mr. Muslehuddin Ahmad, a former secretary and ambassador of Bangladesh. Indeed, it is he who first came out with the proposal to establish a private university in Bangladesh in 1988. On the basis of an article, The Private University in Bangladesh, an initial proposal, by Junaid K. Ahmad, which was published first on 2 February 1988, in Bidesh Bangla, a magazine published in California.

== Campus ==
The university's campus is located in Gulshan-2 Residential Area in Dhaka under the Gulshan Thana.

== Academic departments ==
The university departments are organized into five schools.

=== School of Engineering ===
- Department of Civil Engineering (CE)
- Department of Computer Science and Engineering (CSE)
- Department of Electrical & Electronic Engineering (EEE)
- Department of Electronics & Telecommunication Engineering (ETE)

=== School of Business ===
- Department of Business Administration
- Department of Academic Business

=== School of Liberal Arts & Humanities ===
- Department of English

=== School of Social Sciences ===
- Department of Economics

=== School of Law ===
- Department of Law and Justice

== Academic semester ==
The academic duration of PU has three semesters a year:

- Spring semester: January–April
- Summer semester: May–August
- Fall semester: September–December

== Lab facilities ==
=== CSE/EEE/ETE ===
- Computer Lab
- Outstanding Courses
- Physics Lab
- Chemistry Lab
- Electrical Circuits Lab
- Electronics Lab
- Electrical Machine Lab
- Measurement & Instrumentation Lab
- High Voltage Engineering Lab
- Power Electronics Lab
- Analog Electronics Lab
- VLSI Lab
- Computer Networks Lab
- Digital Signal processing Lab
- Software Engineering Lab
- Microprocessor and Interfacing Lab
- Digital Logic Designing Lab
- Control Systems Lab
- IC Fabrication Lab(Analog & Digital)
- Communication Engineering Lab including
  - Digital Communication Lab
  - Optical Fiber Communication Lab
  - Wireless Communication Lab
  - RF Communication Lab
  - Microwave Engg. Lab

=== Civil Engineering ===
- Computer Lab
- Physics Lab
- Chemistry Lab
- Environmental Engg. Lab
- Fluid Mechanics Lab
- Engineering Drawing, Designing & CAD Lab
- Engineering Materials Lab
- Structural Mechanics Lab
- GIS Lab
- Geotechnical Engineering Lab
- Open Channel Hydraulics Lab
- Water and Waste Water Quality Lab
- Highway Materials and Traffic Engg. Lab
- Quantity surveying Lab

== List of vice-chancellors ==
- Mohammed Muniruzzaman (Ex- Acting VC)
- Md Abdul Mannan Chowdhury (2024–present)

== Publications ==
- Presidency University Journal (PUJ: ISSN 2224-7610)
- SPOTLIGHT (স্পটলাইট)
