= Bangladesh University of Engineering and Technology =

Public University in Dhaka, Bangladesh

- বাংলাদেশ প্রকৌশল বিশ্ববিদ্যালয়
- Other name: BUET
- Former name: List: Dacca Survey School (1876–1908) Ahsanullah School of Engineering (1908–1947) Ahsanullah Engineering College, University of Dacca (1947–1962) East Pakistan University of Engineering and Technology (EPUET) (1962–1971)
- Type: Public research university
- Established: 1876; 150 years ago as School; 1948; 78 years ago as college 1962; 64 years ago as University
- Founder: Khwaja Ahsanullah
- Accreditation: IEB; IAB; ACU; Bangladesh Institute of Planners
- Affiliations: University Grants Commission (UGC)
- Endowment: ৳1.024 billion (2015–16) ($13 million)
- Budget: ৳229.30 crore (US$19 million) (2024–2025)
- Chancellor: President Mirza Fakhrul Islam Alamgir
- Vice-Chancellor: Eqramul Hoque
- Academic staff: 579 (February 2020)
- Administrative staff: 1,338 (February 2020)
- Students: 9,234 (February 2020)
- Undergraduates: 5,636 (February 2020)
- Postgraduates: 3,598 (February 2020)
- Location: Dhaka, 1000, Bangladesh; 23°43′36″N 90°23′33″E
- Campus: Urban, 91.37 acres (36.98 ha)
- Language: English
- Colors: Red
- Website: buet.ac.bd

University rankings

Global – Overall
- QS World: 711-720 (2027)
- THE World: 1001–1200 (2026)

Global – Science and engineering
- THE Computer Science: 601-800 (2026)
- THE Engineering: 601-800 (2026)
- THE Physical Sciences: 601-800 (2026)

Regional – Overall
- QS Asia: 165 (2026)
- THE Asia: 301-350 (2025)

The Bangladesh University of Engineering and Technology (Bengali: বাংলাদেশ প্রকৌশল বিশ্ববিদ্যালয়), commonly known by its acronym BUET, is a public research university located in Dhaka, the capital city of Bangladesh. Founded in 1876 as the Dacca Survey School and gaining university status in 1962, it is the fourth-oldest university and the oldest institution for the study of engineering, architecture, and urban planning in the country. BUET is one of the five PhD granting engineering research universities of Bangladesh along with KUET, CUET, RUET, and DUET.

== History ==
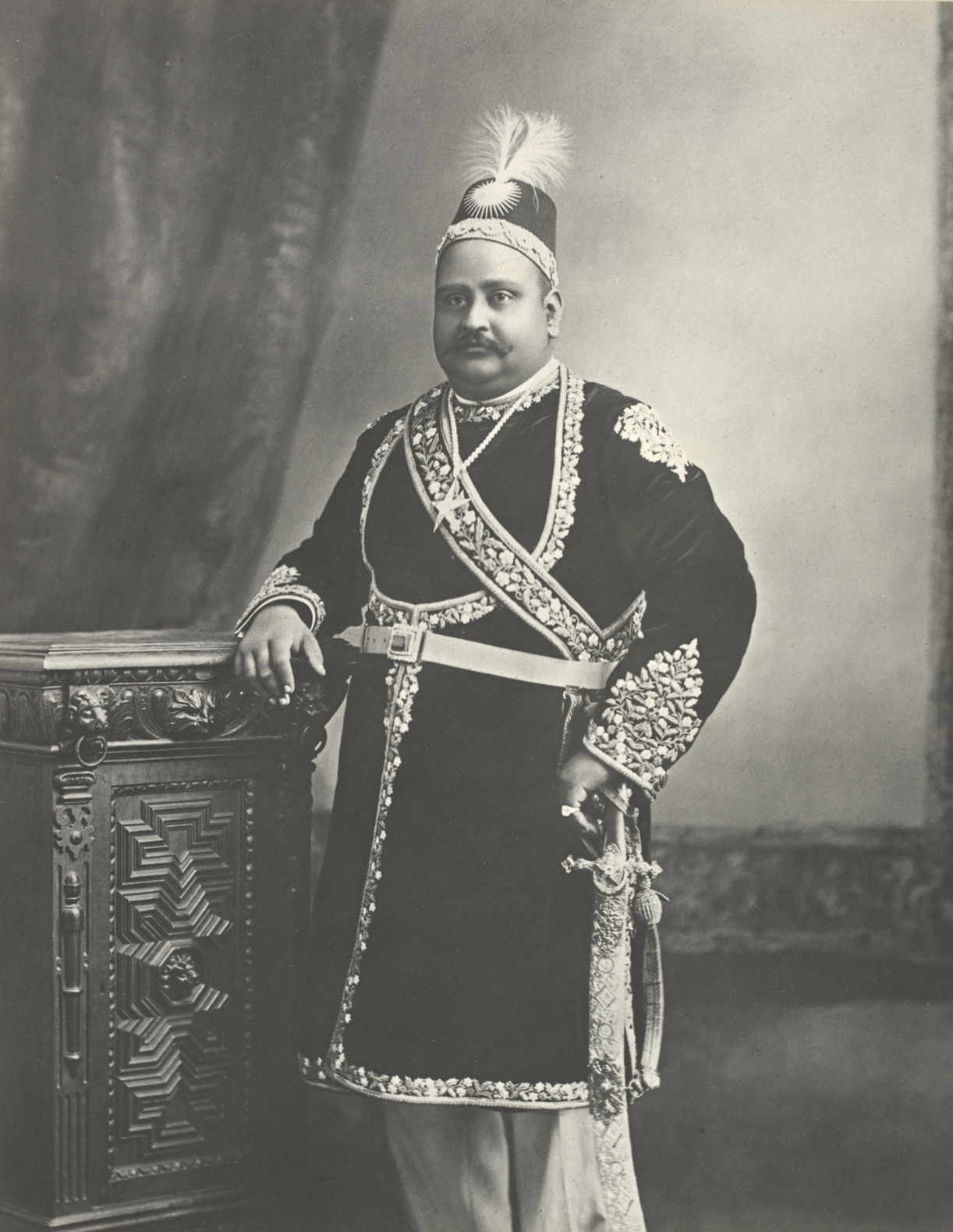
Nawab Bahadur Sir Khwaja Salimullah released a grant in 1902 in accordance with the wish of his late father. In acknowledgement of this contribution, the survey school was renamed Ahsanullah School of Engineering in 1908.

The Dacca Survey School was established in 1876 at Nalgola, west of the present Sir Salimullah Medical College campus in Old Dhaka, by the Government of Bengal during the British Raj. It offered two-year engineering and survey courses toward the Sub-Overseer's examination, which certified land surveyors.

According to a report on public instruction in Bengal, on 31 March 1903, Dhaka Survey School had 117 students of which 103 were Hindus and 14 were Muslims. In 1908, the school started to offer three year diploma courses. Nawab Sir Khwaja Ahsanullah, a philanthropist and Nawab of Dhaka, endowed donations for developing the survey school. After his death in 1901, his son, the then Nawab of Dhaka, Sir Khwaja Salimullah released the grant in 1902 in accordance with his late father's wish. As an acknowledgement of this contribution, the school was renamed to Ahsanullah School of Engineering in 1908.

The school offered three-year diploma courses in civil engineering, electrical engineering and mechanical engineering in 1908. In 1912, the university was moved to its present premises. In 1938, A. K. Fazlul Huq, the then Prime Minister of Bengal, appointed Hakim Ali as the principal of the school.

After the partition of India in 1947, Chief Minister of East Bengal Sir Khawaja Nazimuddin approved the school to be upgraded to Ahsanullah Engineering College, as a faculty of engineering under the University of Dhaka, offering four-year bachelor's course in civil, electrical, mechanical, chemical and metallurgical engineering.

In 1948, the government of East Bengal granted recognition to the engineering college. Ali became the first principal of the college. In 1951, TH Mathewman was appointed the next principal. M. A. Rashid succeeded him in 1954 as the first Bengali principal of the college and held the post until 1960. In 1956, a new course curriculum and the semester system were introduced at the college.

In 1961, The Engineering and Technological University Ordinance, 1961 (East Pakistan Ordinance) (Ordinance NO. XXXVI OF 1961) was passed to establish a university in Dacca, East Pakistan. On 1 June 1962, in order to create facilities for postgraduate studies and research, the college was upgraded to East Pakistan University of Engineering and Technology (EPUET), becoming the fourth university of the then East Pakistan. Rashid was appointed the first vice-chancellor of the university.

A partnership with the Agricultural and Mechanical College of Texas (renamed Texas A&M University) was forged, and professors from A&M came to teach and formulate the curriculum. During this period, EPUET offered courses in mechanical, electrical, civil, metallurgical, and chemical engineering, and architecture.

After the liberation war of 1971, and Bangladesh's independence, EPUET was renamed to Bangladesh University of Engineering and Technology (BUET).

In 2007, BUET celebrated 60 years (1947–2007) of engineering education in Bangladesh by arranging a 6-month-long series of programs and events. In February 2021, BUET and Chinese multinational technology company Huawei signed a memorandum of understanding (MoU) to establish the first ICT Academy in Bangladesh on BUET campus.

On 21 June 2021, BUET and Saitama University, Japan signed second renewal of the agreement on academic exchange and the memorandum on student exchange between the two institutions. Saitama University (SU) and BUET have had a long-standing relationship for the past 20 years.

In January 2022, BUET was ranked 1^{st} among Bangladeshi and 1589^{th} among global educational institutions in the Webometrics Ranking of World Universities.

== Academics ==
=== Campus ===
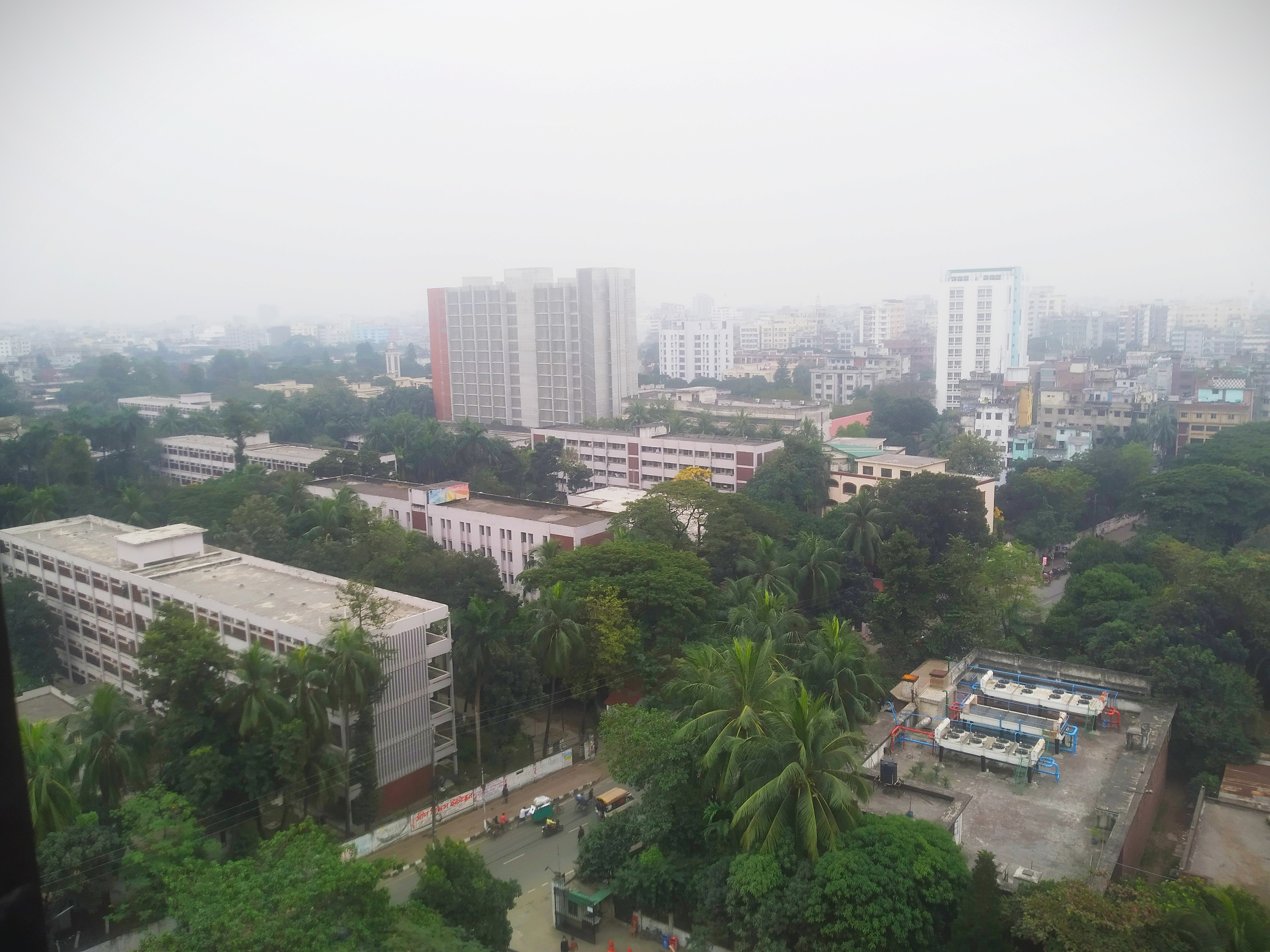
BUET Skyline

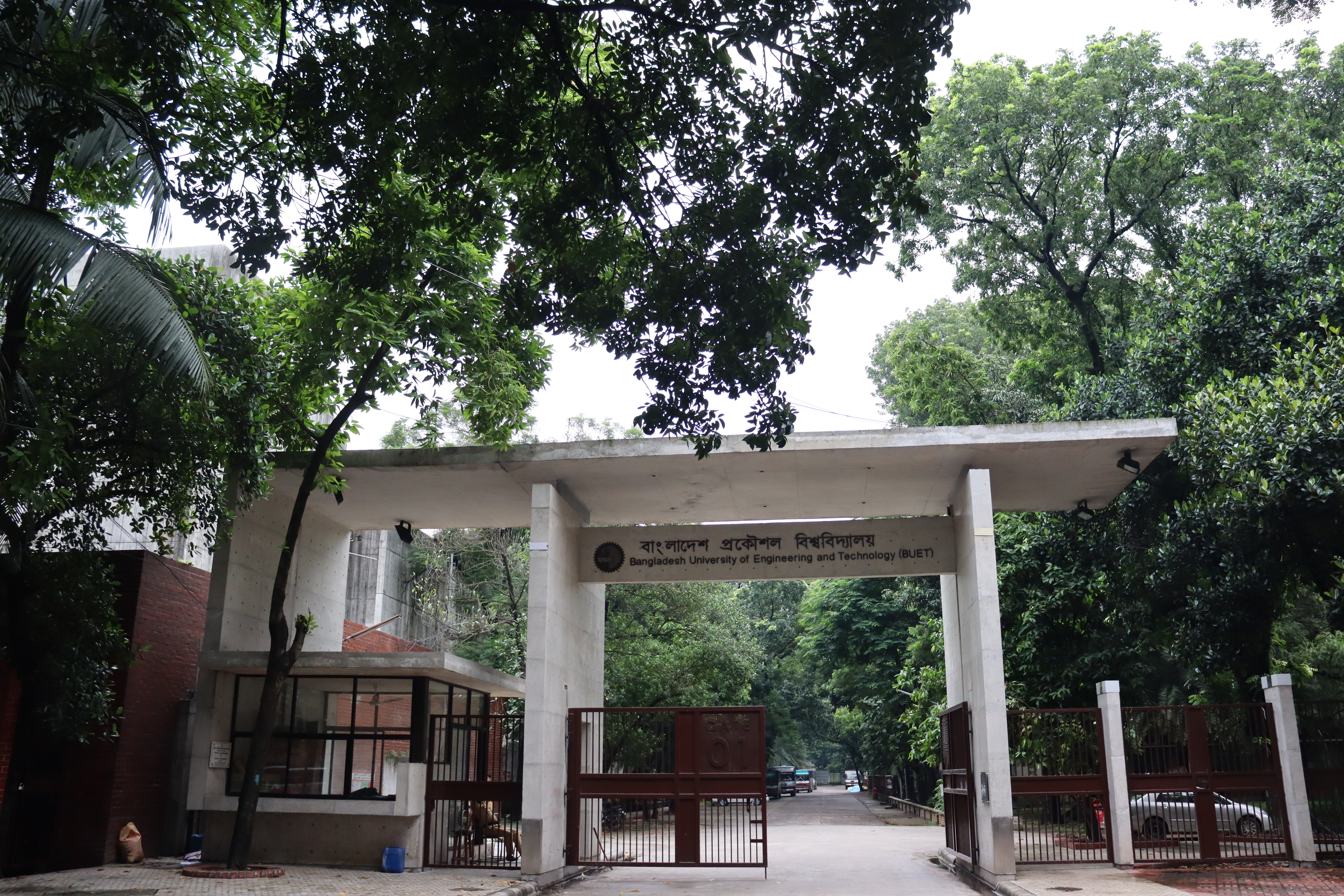
Newly built entrance of BUET campus

BUET has an urban campus located in the Palashi area of Dhaka. The campus houses academic and administrative buildings, residential halls for students and other amenities.

=== Faculties and departments ===
Academic activities are undertaken by 18 departments under six faculties. Thirteen departments offer undergraduate courses, all of which, except the department of humanities, offer postgraduate courses as well.

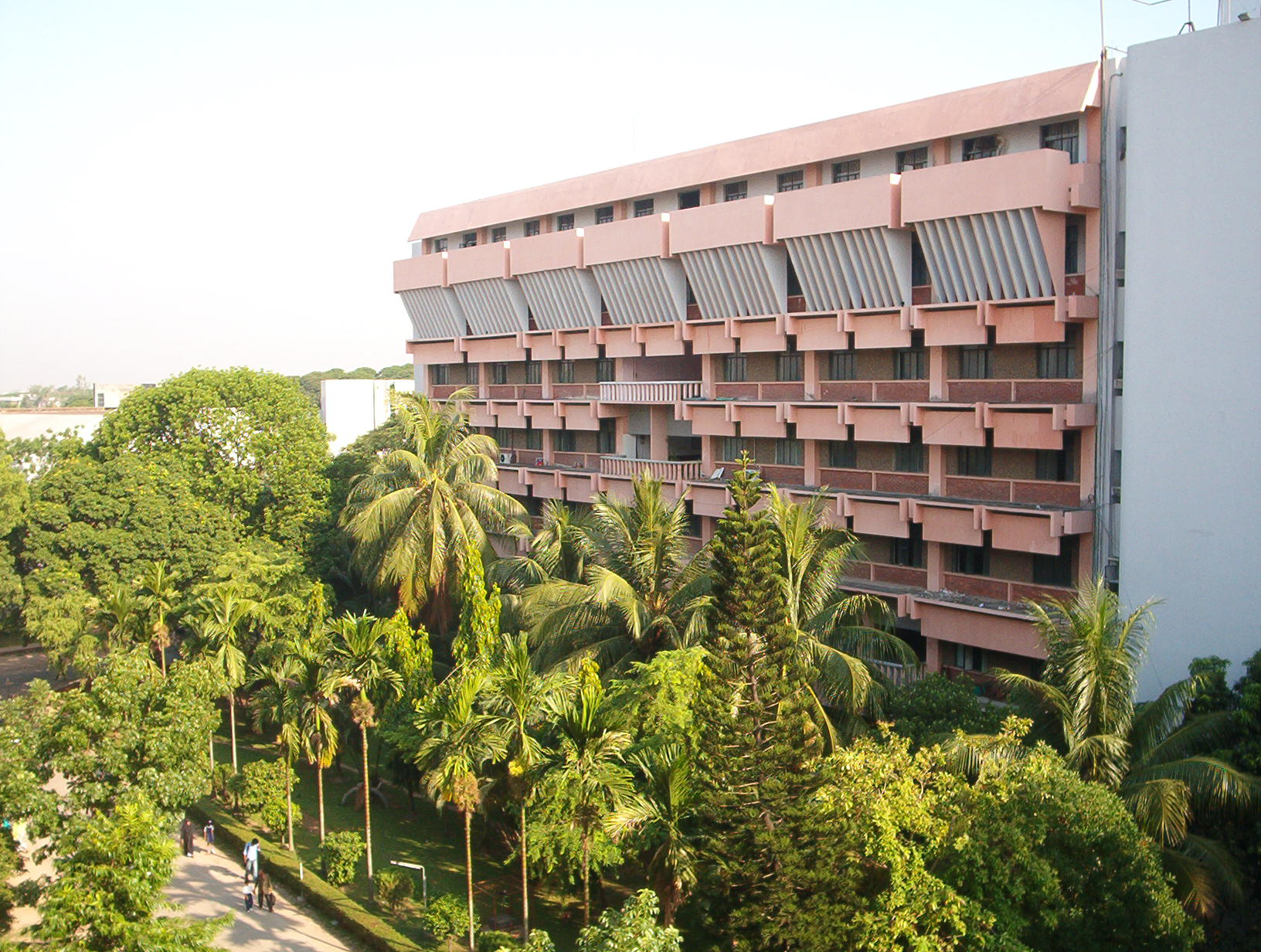
West wing of the Civil Engineering Building

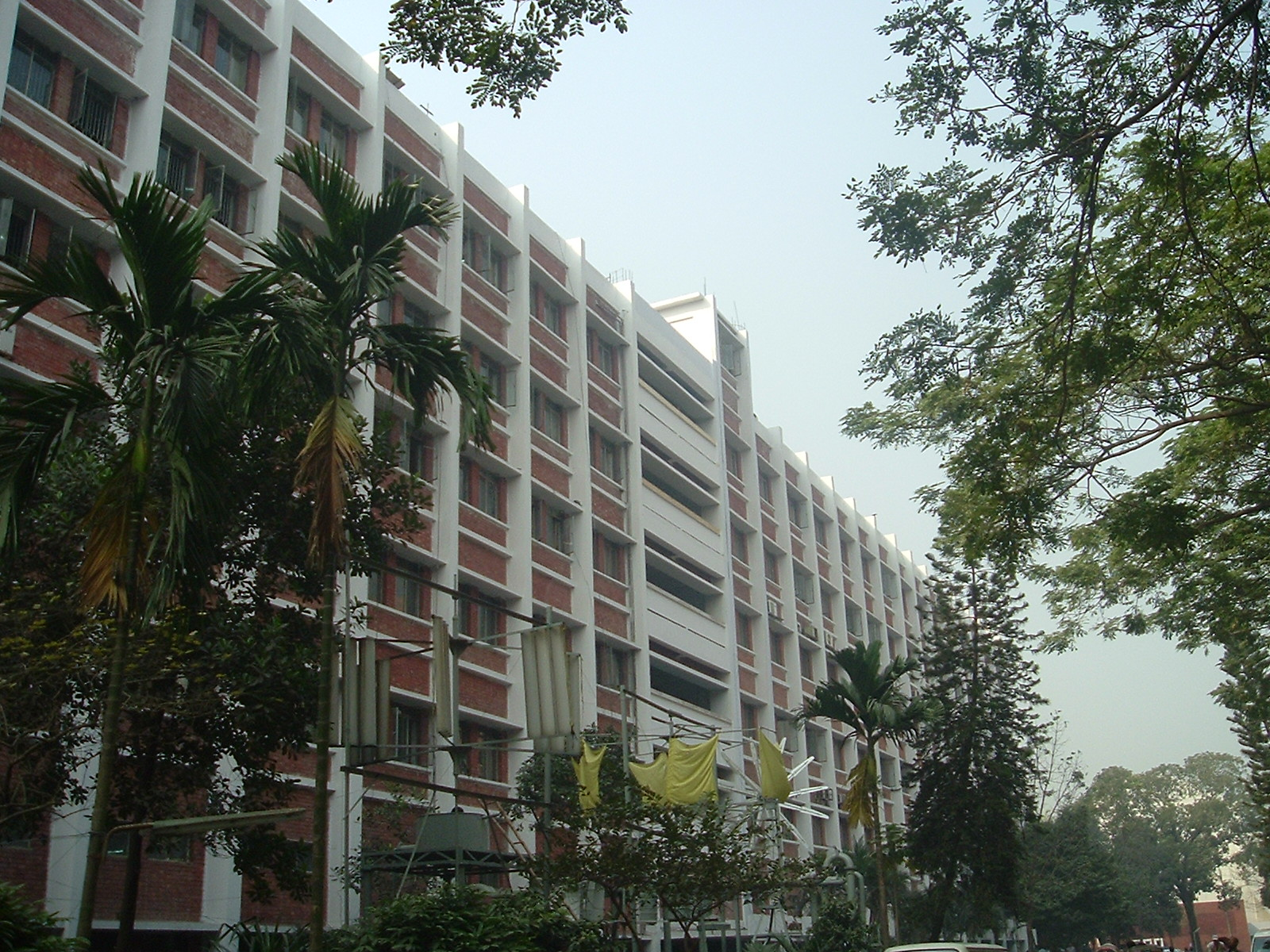
Mechanical Engineering Building

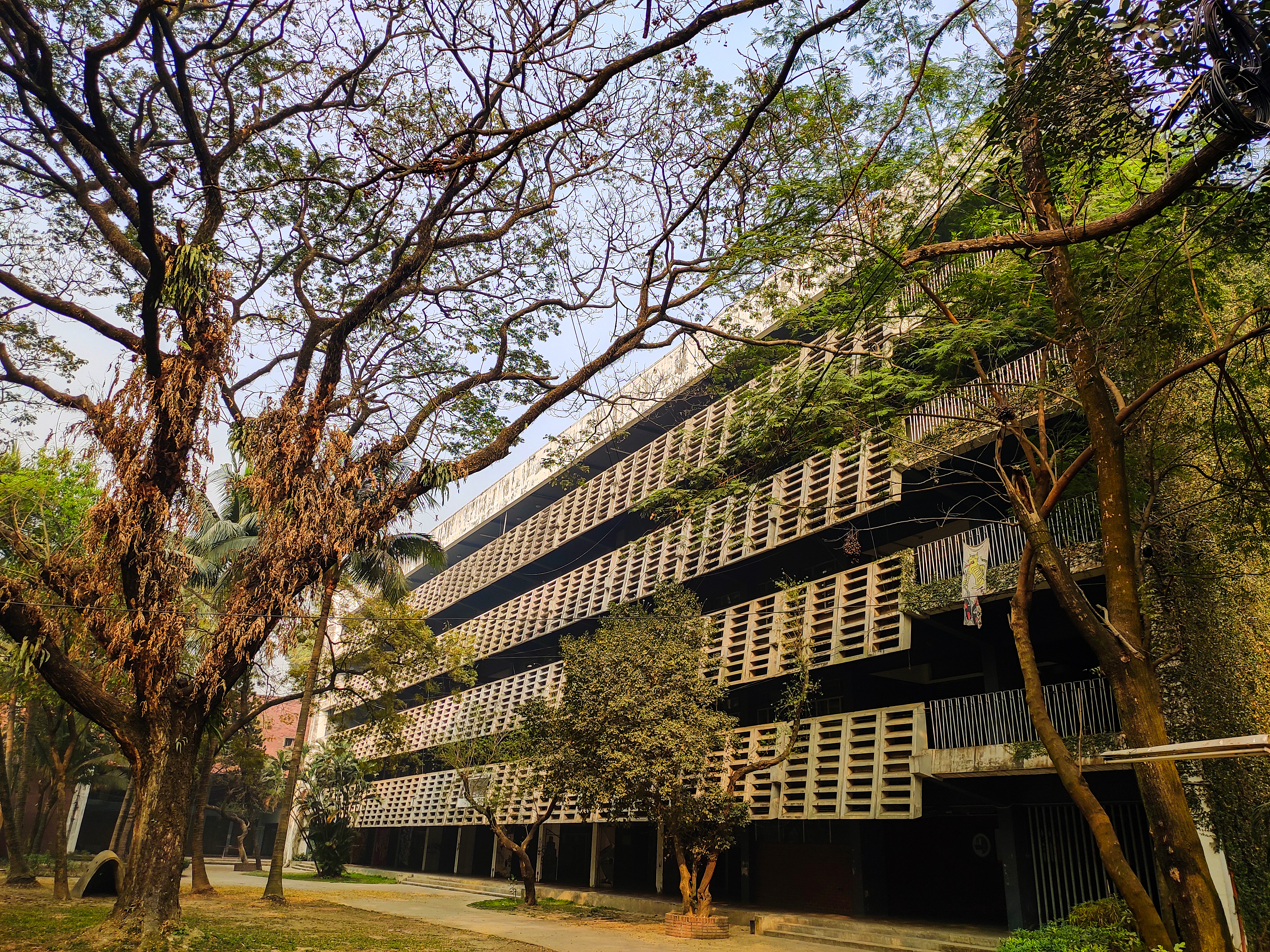
Entry approach of the Department of Architecture, BUET

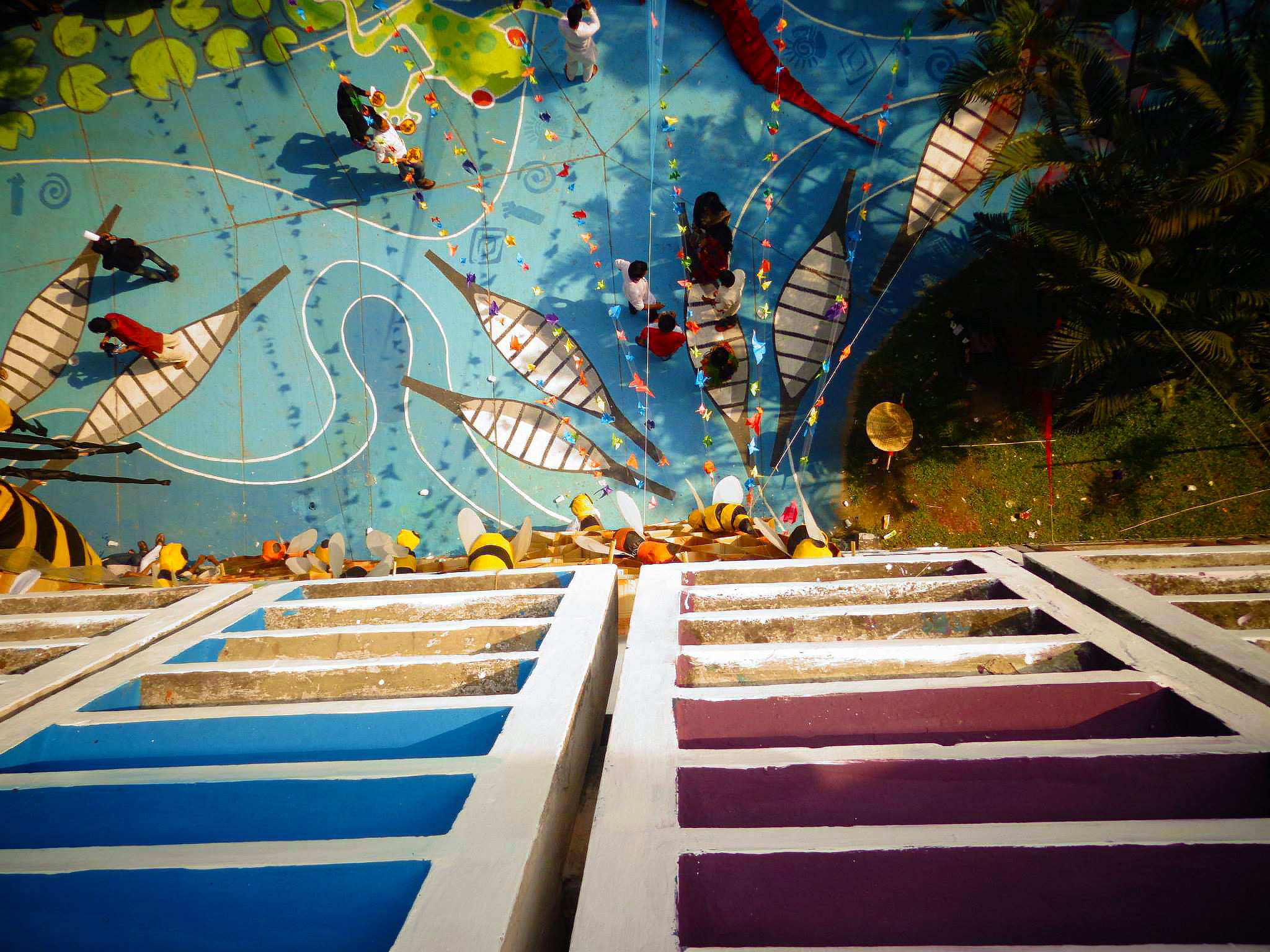
Aerial view of the plinth level of the Architecture Building

- Faculty of Chemical and Materials Engineering:
  - Department of Chemical Engineering (ChE)
  - Department of Materials and Metallurgical Engineering (MME)
  - Department of Nanomaterials and Ceramic Engineering (NCE)
  - Department of Petroleum and Mineral Resources Engineering (PMRE)
- Faculty of Civil Engineering:
  - Department of Civil Engineering (CE)
  - Department of Water Resources Engineering (WRE)
- Faculty of Electrical and Electronic Engineering:
  - Department of Electrical and Electronic Engineering (EEE)
  - Department of Computer Science and Engineering (CSE)
  - Department of Biomedical Engineering (BME)
- Faculty of Science:
  - Department of Chemistry (Chem)
  - Department of Mathematics (Math)
  - Department of Physics (Phys)
- Faculty of Mechanical Engineering:
  - Department of Mechanical Engineering (ME)
  - Department of Naval Architecture and Marine Engineering (NAME)
  - Department of Industrial and Production Engineering (IPE)
- Faculty of Architecture and Planning:
  - Department of Architecture (Arch)
  - Department of Urban and Regional Planning (URP)
  - Department of Humanities (Hum)

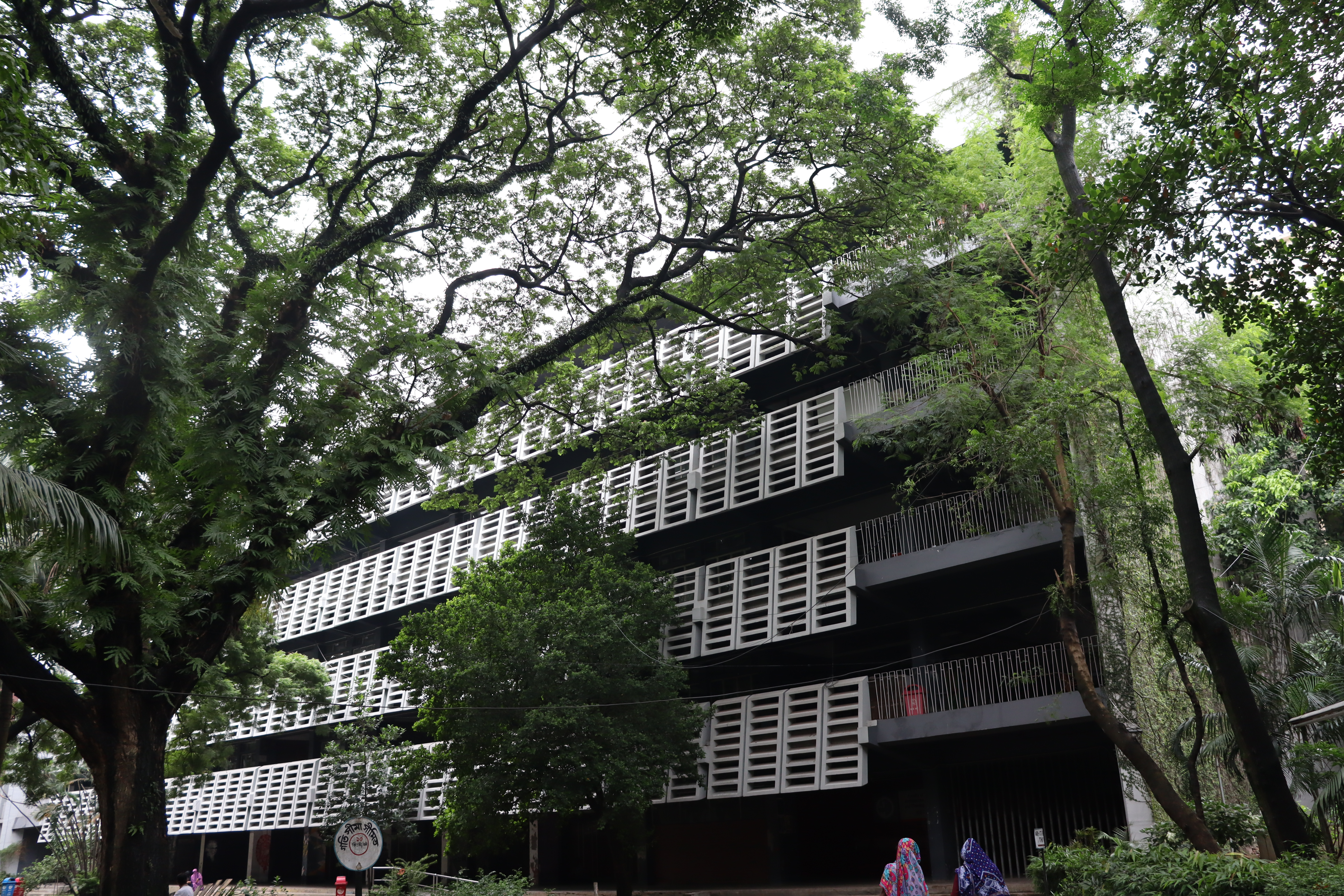
Faculty of Architecture and planning Building

=== Institutes ===
At present, there are eight institutes in BUET. These institutes offer postgraduate diplomas, master's and doctoral degrees.

- Institute of Water and Flood Management (IWFM)
- Institute of Appropriate Technology (IAT)
- Institute of Information and Communication Technology (IICT)
- Accident Research Institute (ARI)
- BUET-Japan Institute of Disaster Prevention and Urban Safety (BUET-JIDPUS)
- Institute of Nuclear Power Engineering (INPE)
- Institute Of Robotics And Automation (IRAB)
- Institute of Energy and Sustainable Development (IESD)

=== Research centers ===
BUET has several research centres.

- Centre for Energy Studies (CES)
- Centre for Environmental and Resource Management (CERM)
- Biomedical Engineering Centre (BEC)
- Bureau of Research, Testing & Consultation (BRTC)
- International Training Network Centre (ITN)
- Bangladesh Network Office for Urban Safety (BNUS)
- Applied Bioengineering Research Incubator (ABRI)

=== Directorates ===
- Directorate of Advisory, Extension and Research Services (DAERS)
- Directorate of Students' Welfare (DSW)
- Directorate of Planning and Development (P&D)
- Directorate of Continuing Education (DCE)

=== Journals and research bulletins ===
- Journal of Mechanical Engineering Research and Developments
- Chemical Engineering Research Bulletin
- Bangladesh Journal of Water Resources Research
- Electrical and Electronic Engineering Research Bulletin
- Protibesh (Research Journal on Architecture)

=== Rankings ===
BUET has been ranked #801–850 in the world, #187 in Asia and #2 in Bangladesh by QS World University Rankings in 2024.

=== Library ===
BUET central library has a collection of 142,913 items of information materials. Among the materials, 125,066 and 17,847 are books and bound periodicals respectively. Besides, 152 titles are in the current subscription list of journals. Every year, 1500 volumes are added to this library. The main reading room of the central library can accommodate 200 students at a time to provide reading facilities of rare and out-of-print books, and also ready reference and prescribed textbooks. There are also departmental libraries in each of the departments and institutes and hall libraries in each of the residence halls.

On 8 February 2025, the name of the central library was changed as 'Shahid Abrar Fahad Library' in the memory of Abrar Fahad.

== Convocations ==
After the independence of Bangladesh and the subsequent name change, the first convocation of the university was held in 1973. Since then, convocations have been held in 1976, 1992, 1993, 1997, 2001, 2004, 2005, 2006, 2011 and 2019.

== Administration ==
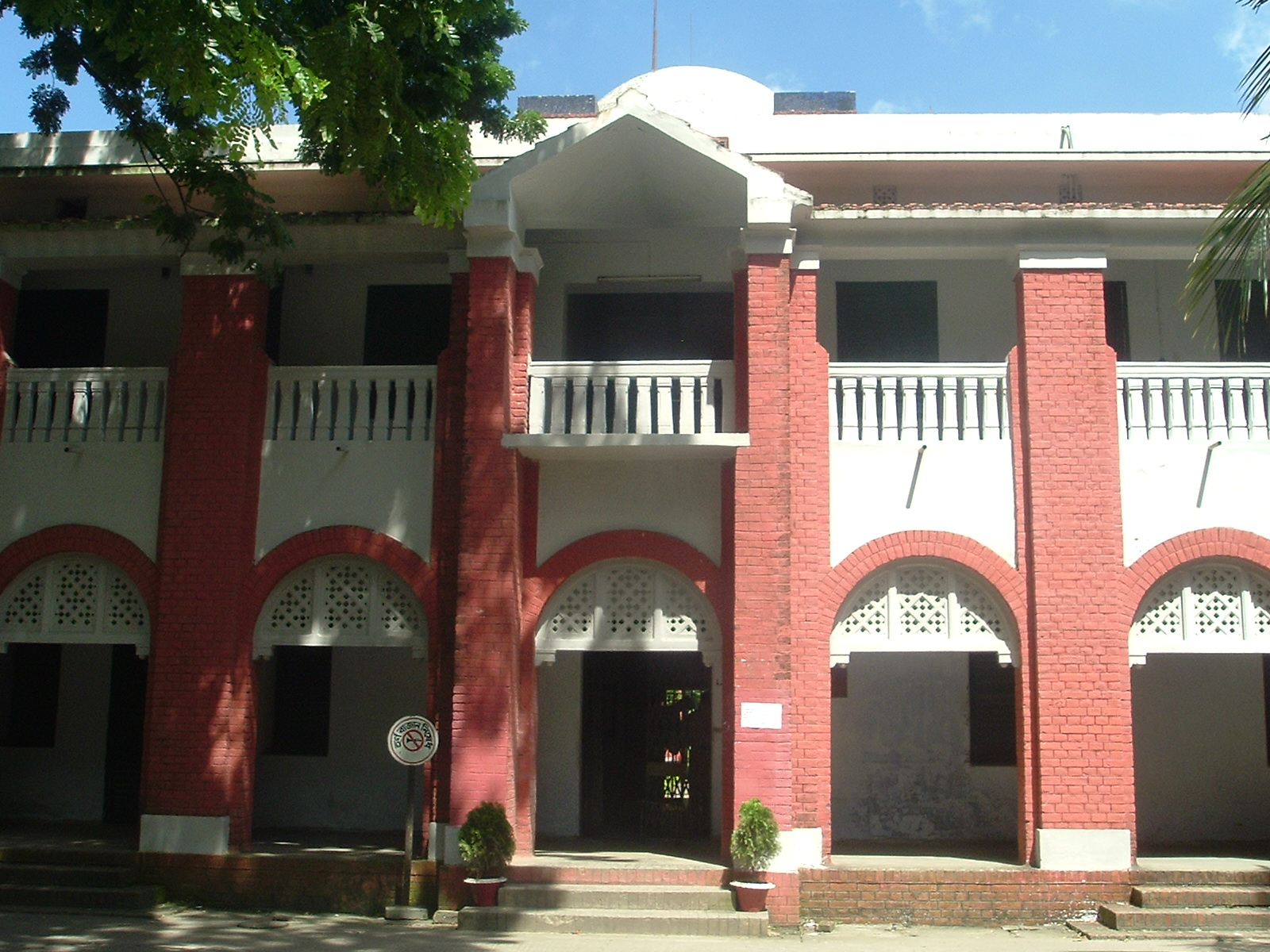
Registrar Building established in 1930

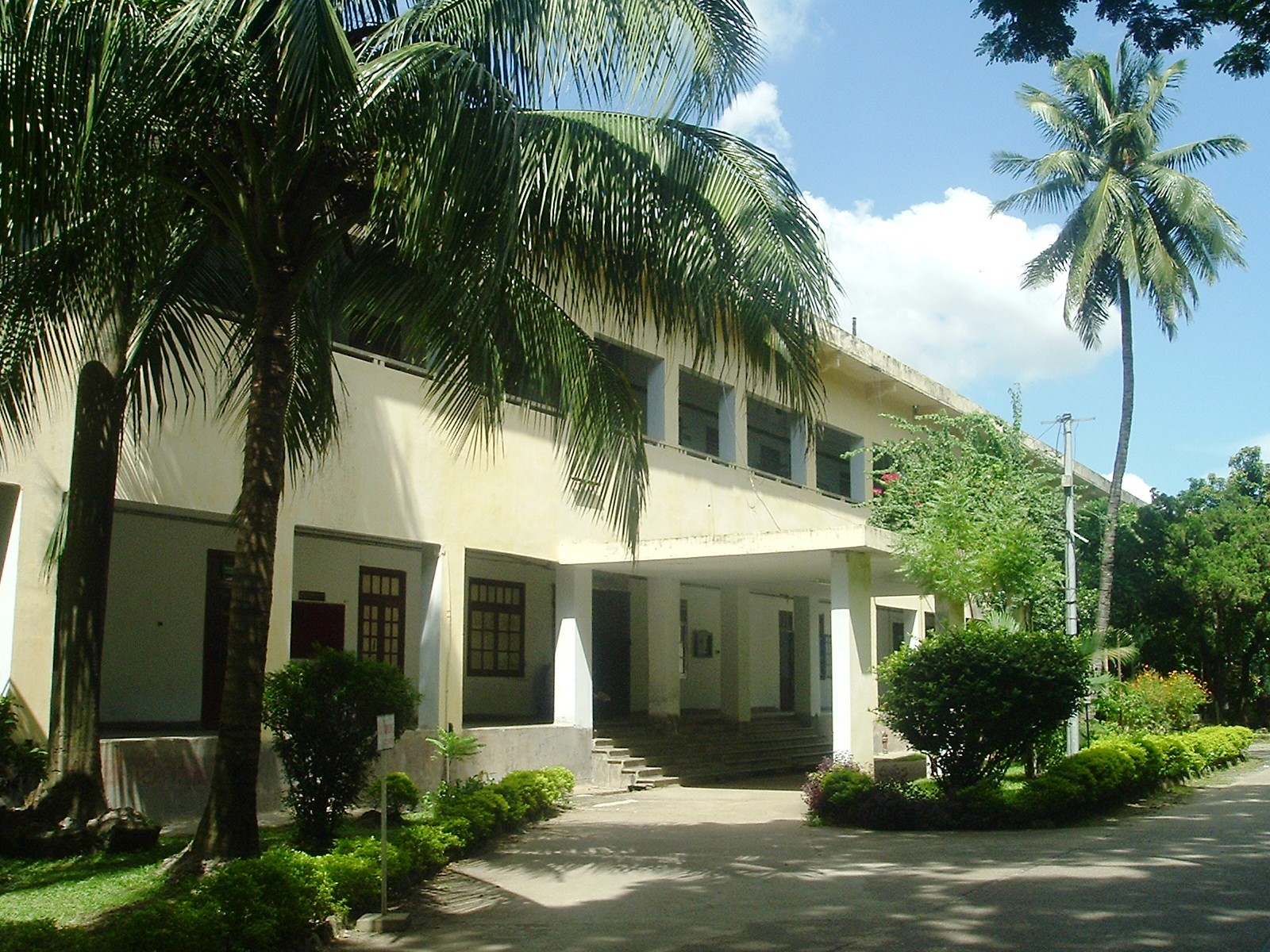
Old Academic Building

The chancellor is the ceremonial head of the university who appoints the vice-chancellor. The position is held by the incumbent president of Bangladesh. The vice-chancellor is the executive head of the university. The position is always held by a senior professor of the university. The university is administered by the University Syndicate which is chaired by the vice-chancellor.

Members of the syndicate include deans of several faculties, director general of Secondary and Higher Education in Bangladesh, director general of Technical Education in Bangladesh, eminent academics from this university as well as from other famous public universities. Each of the faculties is headed by a dean and each of the departments is chaired by a head of the department.

They are generally full professors from their respective faculties and departments. Institutes, Research Centers and Directorates are headed by the directors who are full professors from relevant fields of research. Other major administrative posts include the registrar, the comptroller and the controller of exams.

The university has also the following Statutory Authorities.

- Academic Council
- Finance Committee
- Faculties
- Selection Boards
- Committee for Advanced Studies and Research (CASR)
- Planning and Development Committee
- Boards of Postgraduate Studies (BPGS)
- Boards of Undergraduate Studies (BUGS)

The University Syndicate is the supreme authority in major policy-making matters and in approving recommendations. The Finance Committee, the Planning and Development Committee and other committees assist the syndicate in matters important for the proper functioning of the university. The Academic Council is the supreme body for formulating academic rules and regulations to which the CASR, Boards of Undergraduate and Postgraduate Studies and the faculties recommend.

== List of vice-chancellors ==
Following is the complete list of the vice-chancellors.

No.	Name	Term of office
1	M. A. Rashid	1 June 1962 – 16 March 1970
2	Mohammed Abu Naser	16 March 1970 – 25 April 1975
3	Wahiduddin Ahmed	25 April 1975 – 24 April 1983
4	Abdul Matin Patwari	24 April 1983 – 25 April 1987
5	Musharrof Husain Khan	25 April 1987 – 24 April 1991
6	Muhammad Shahjahan	24 April 1991 – 27 November 1996
7	Iqbal Mahmud	27 November 1996 – 14 October 1998
8	Nooruddin Ahmed	14 October 1998 – 30 August 2002
9	Md. Alee Murtuza	30 August 2002 – 29 August 2006
10	A. M. M. Safiullah	30 August 2006 – 29 August 2010
11	S M Nazrul Islam	30 August 2010 – 13 September 2014
12	Khaleda Ekram	14 September 2014 – 24 May 2016
13	Saiful Islam	22 June 2016 – 25 June 2020
14	Satya Prasad Majumder	25 June 2020 – 18 August 2024
15	A. B. M. Badruzzaman	12 September 2024 – 14 May 2026
16	Eqramul Hoque	14 May 2026 - incumbent

== Admission ==
=== Undergraduate ===
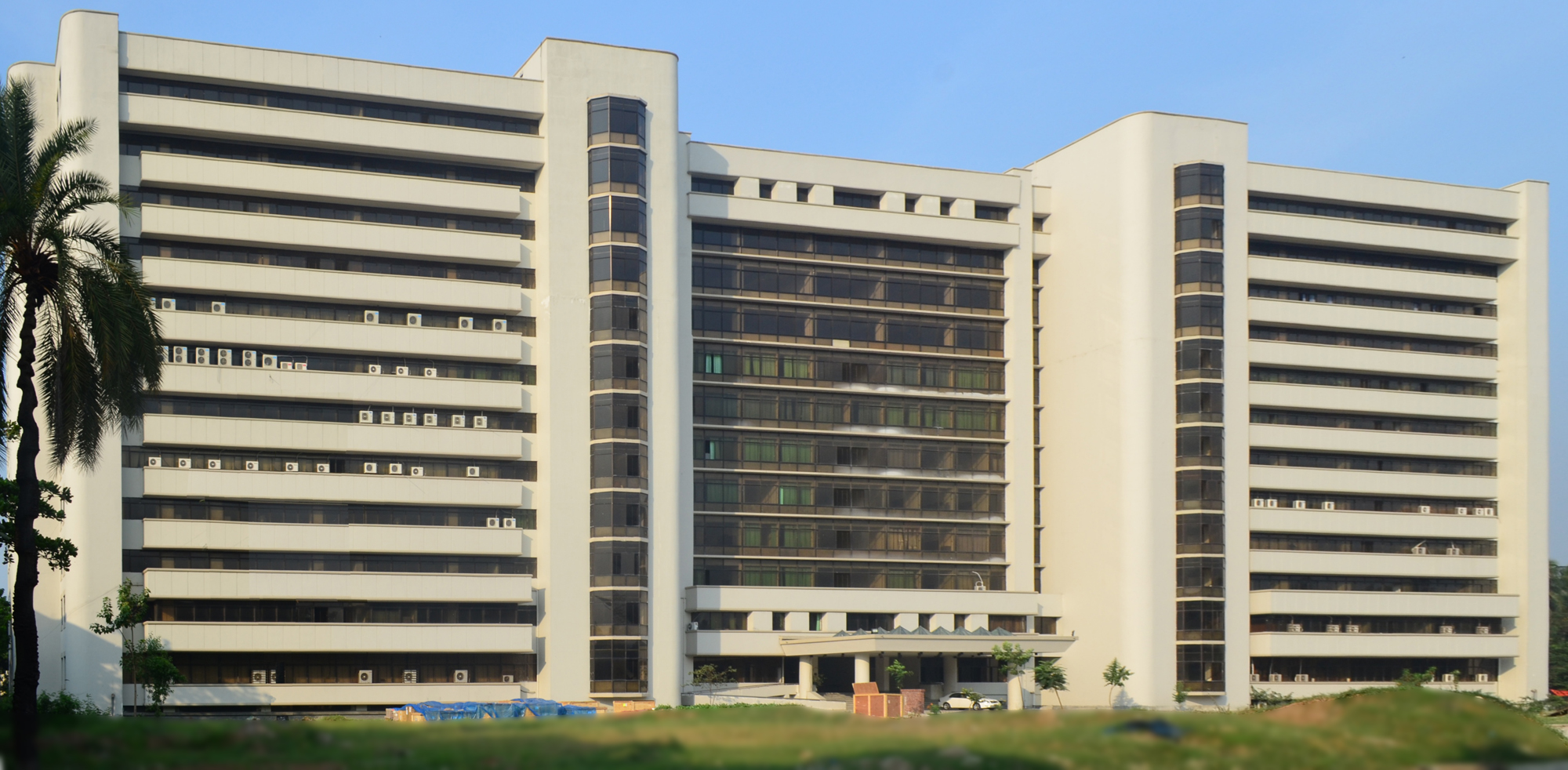
Electrical and Computer Engineering Building

The undergraduate admission of BUET is based on grades and examinations. Extracurriculars or financial needs are not considered in the admission process.

The undergraduate admission test is a fairly competitive written examination. After completion of higher secondary level (HSC) education, a student can submit his/her application for undergraduate admission if he/she fulfills the minimum requirements.

The students with the best grades in mathematics, physics and chemistry on their Higher Secondary School Certificate (HSC) examination are allowed to take the admission test. The screening process allows 18,000 students to sit for the preliminary admission test based on the cumulative sum of their GPA in those three subjects.

After the admission test, about 1,309 students get selected on the basis of merit and are offered admission. The admission test is of 400 marks, with 40 questions carrying 10 marks each. 13 questions are from physics, 13 from chemistry and 14 from mathematics. The test is taken within two hours.

There are 26 seats for foreign students at the undergraduate level. The pre-requisite qualification for admission is HSC or GCE A-level or its equivalent with high grades in mathematics, physics, and chemistry. The admission fee is $200; the course registration fee is US$50 per credit hour and the approximate cost of food, lodging etc. is US$100 per month. A maximum of 10 students from a single country are allowed for admission.

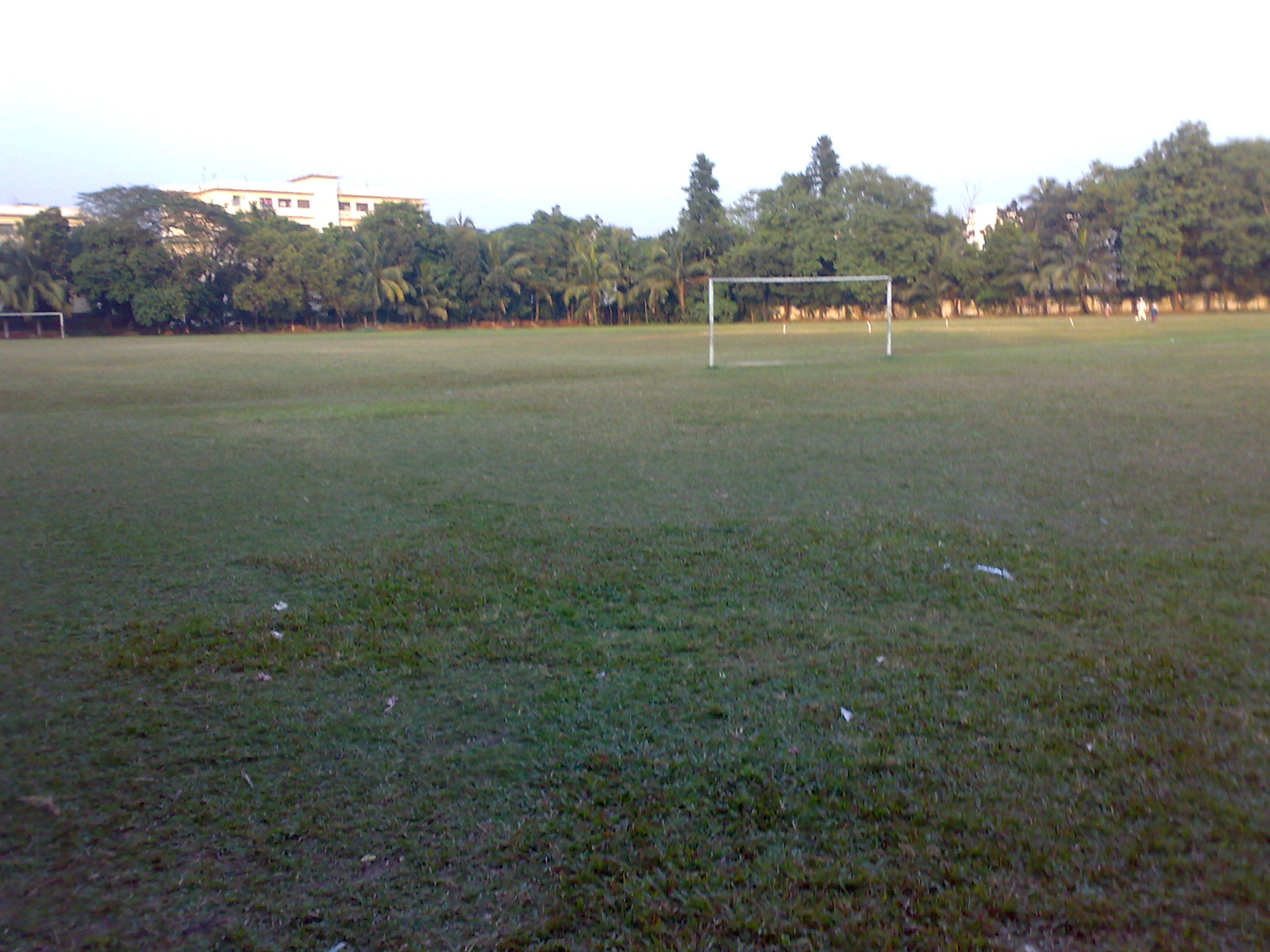
Playground of BUET

Department	No. of Student
Chemical Engineering	120
Materials & Metallurgical Engineering	60
Nanomaterials & Ceramic Engineering	30
Civil Engineering	195
Water Resources Engineering	30
Mechanical Engineering	180
Naval Architecture & Marine Engineering	55
Industrial & Production Engineering	120
Electrical & Electronic Engineering	195
Computer Science & Engineering	180
Biomedical Engineering	50
Architecture	60
Urban Planning & Regional Planning	30
Total	1305

=== Postgraduate ===
In master's and PhD programs, around 1,000 graduate students are accepted on an annual basis. For admission to these programs, candidates are required to appear in interviews and/or written tests.

Postgraduate degrees offered by departments and institutes are MSc (Master of Science), MSc Engg. (Master of Science in Engineering), M. Engg (Master of Engineering), MURP (Master of Urban and Regional Planning), MArch (Master of Architecture), M.Phil. (Master of Philosophy) and PhD (Doctor of Philosophy). Postgraduate diplomas (PG. Dip.) are also offered in IT and Water resources development.

== Research programs ==
For consultation and research the expertise at the university, its teachers and the laboratory facilities are available to other organizations of the country. A separate institution – Bureau of Research, Testing and Consultation (BRTC) has been formed to oversee these activities.

The university undertakes research programs sponsored by outside organizations like United Nations Organizations, Commonwealth Foundation, European Union, University Grants Commission (Bangladesh), World Bank, Asian Development Bank, DfID, JICA etc.

=== Conferences and workshops ===
BUET regularly organizes national and international conferences and workshops in its campus to enhance the research capabilities of its students and faculties. Among the conferences organized by BUET, following are notable:

- International Conference on Information and Communication Technology
- International Conference on Mechanical Engineering (ICME)
- International Conference on Water and Flood Management (ICWFM)
- Bangladesh Civil Engineering Summit
- International Earthquake Symposium, Bangladesh
- International Conference on Disaster Risk Management (ICDRM)
- International Conference on Chemical Engineering (ICChE)
- International Conference on Climate Change Impacts and Adaption Strategies
- Bangladesh Geotechnical Conference
- International Conference on Electrical and Computer Engineering (ICECE)
- International Symposium and Workshop on Sustainable Transport for Developing Countries (STDC)
- International Conference on Marine Technology (MARTEC)
- International Workshop on Algorithms and Computation (WALCOM)
- International Conference on Networking Systems and Security (NSysS)

=== Notable innovations ===
BUET established the Research and Innovation Centre for Science and Engineering (RISE) as a central hub to promote research and innovation across the university. RISE raises and manages internal and external research funds, sets up shared research facilities.

In 2004, BUET's Institute of Information and Communication Technology (IICT) designed and developed prepaid electricity meters as contracted with the Dhaka Electric Supply Company (DESCO) for the first time in Bangladesh. In 2009, IICT designed and manufactured prepaid gas meters for Titas Gas to supply for the residential customers in Dhanmondi.

Bangladesh's first electronic voting machines were designed at BUET, beginning in 2005, by a team supervised by S. M. Lutful Kabir of IICT. They were first used at 14 polling stations in the Chittagong City Corporation election on 17 June 2010.

During the COVID-19 pandemic, researchers in the Department of Biomedical Engineering developed OxyJet, a low-cost, non-invasive CPAP device, which was approved by the Directorate General of Drug Administration (DGDA) in July 2021.

Researchers in the Department of Chemical Engineering hold Bangladeshi patents for paper-based tests that detect formaldehyde in food, water and biofluids and uric acid in biofluids. Under a 2021 grant from the Bangladesh Energy and Power Research Council, a team from the Department of Mechanical Engineering designed a standardised battery-run rickshaw. The Dhaka North and Dhaka South city corporations launched a pilot of the vehicle. In August 2025, semi-automated traffic signals built to BUET designs began operating at seven intersections in Dhaka under a pilot programme.

In July 2026, the Department of Electrical and Electronic Engineering completed the tape-out of Pragati v1, an open-source 32-bit RISC-V system-on-chip for household appliances and Internet of Things devices. It was designed with open-source tools and fabricated by IHP on its 130 nm process.

== Political issues and anti-politics movement ==
In 2002, a first year student in the chemical engineering department, Sabekun Nahar Sony, was killed during a factional clash between two feuding groups of the Jatiyatabadi Chhatra Dal (JCD) at BUET. The two factions exchanged gunfire and she was caught in the crossfire.

In October 2019, sophomore Abrar Fahad was tortured and beaten to death in Sher-e-Bangla Hall, by members of the Bangladesh Chhatra League (BCL) the student wing of the then ruling Awami League party. The BSL was banned in 2024. The Independent reported that beatings and torture by the BCL were common in the dormitories. Fahad's murder sparked nearly two months of student protests against violent ragging and bullying at the residence halls. The protests ended after university authorities met student demands. They expelled for life 25 students allegedly involved in the killing, expelled a further 15 from their places in Ahsan Ullah Hall, Suhrawardy Hall, and Titumir Hall, handed down various suspensions and warnings, and adopted new penalties for ragging and political activities.

According to Ordinance 1962, all organizational politics have been banned in Bangladesh Engineering University. After a university student, Abrar Fahad was beaten to death by the BUET Chhatra League, the vice-chancellor of the university, Saiful Islam, banned all kinds of student politics and political organizations and their activities in the campus. According to the university ordinance, teacher politics has also been banned on the campus.

== Clubs and organizations ==
=== Science and Technology Related Clubs ===
- Satyen Bose Science Club
- BUET Nuclear Engineering Club
- BUET Automobile Club
- BUET Energy Club
- BUET Robotics Society
- BUET Cyber Security Club
- Team Interplanetar
- BUET Innovation and Designing Club

=== Art and Cultural ===
- BUET Drama Society
- BUET Film Society
- Murchona
- Origami Club
- Alokbortika-BUET
- BUET Sahitya Sangsad
- Charcoal- Artista Society
- Kontho-BUET

=== Photography ===
- BUET Photographic Society

=== Environment ===
- Environment Watch

=== Sports ===
- BUET Chess Club

=== Humanitarian Organizations ===
- BADHAN-BUET zone
- BUET Rover Scout Group

=== Career ===
- BUET Career Club
- BUET Debating Club
- BUET Entrepreneurship Development Club

=== Other Organizations ===
- BUET Brainiacs
- BUET Media and Communication Club
- BUET Self Defence Club
- House of Volunteers BUET- HoV BUET

== Student life ==
=== Halls of residence ===
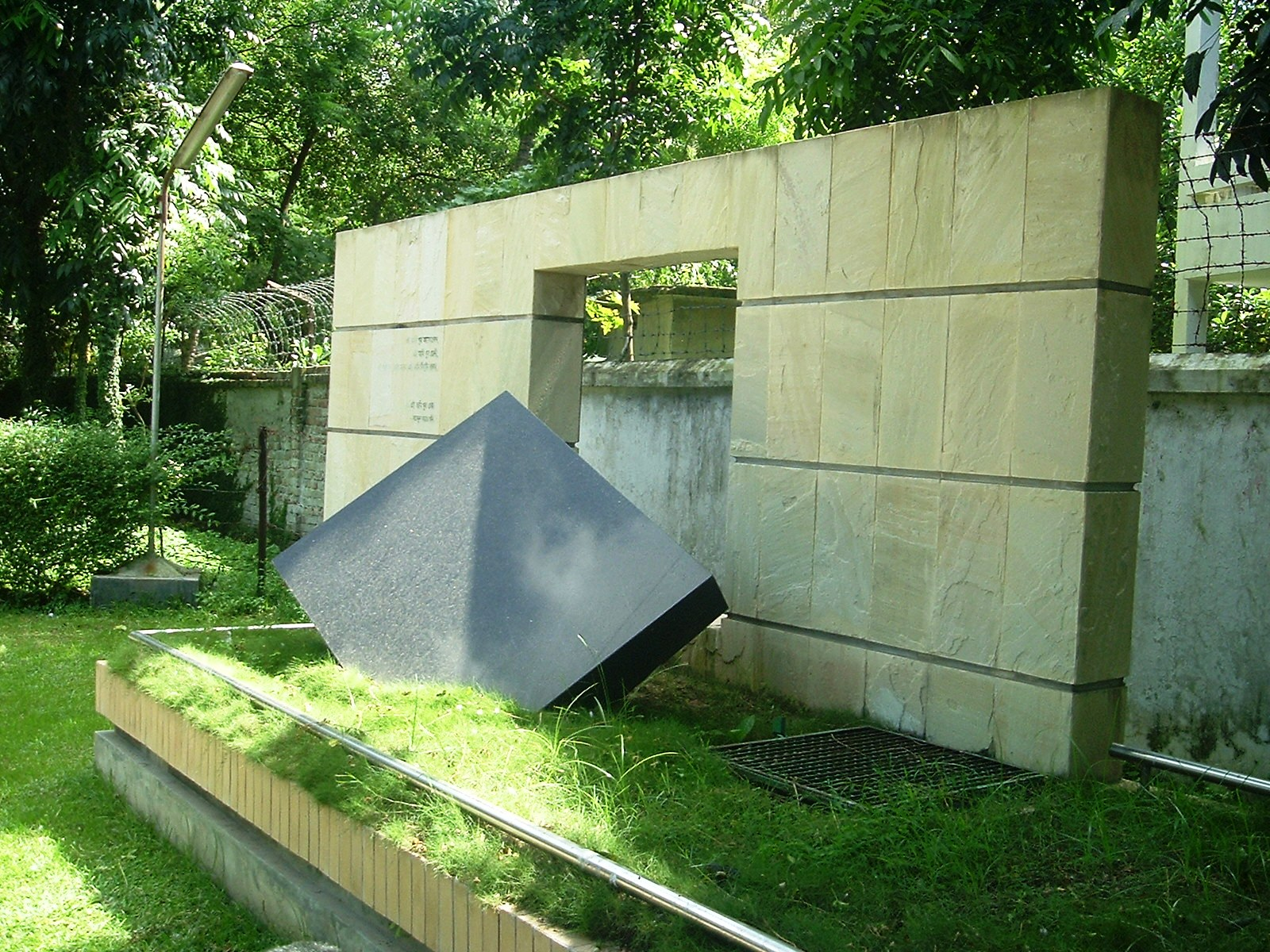
Sabekunnahar Sony Memorial Sculpture, beside Titumir Hall

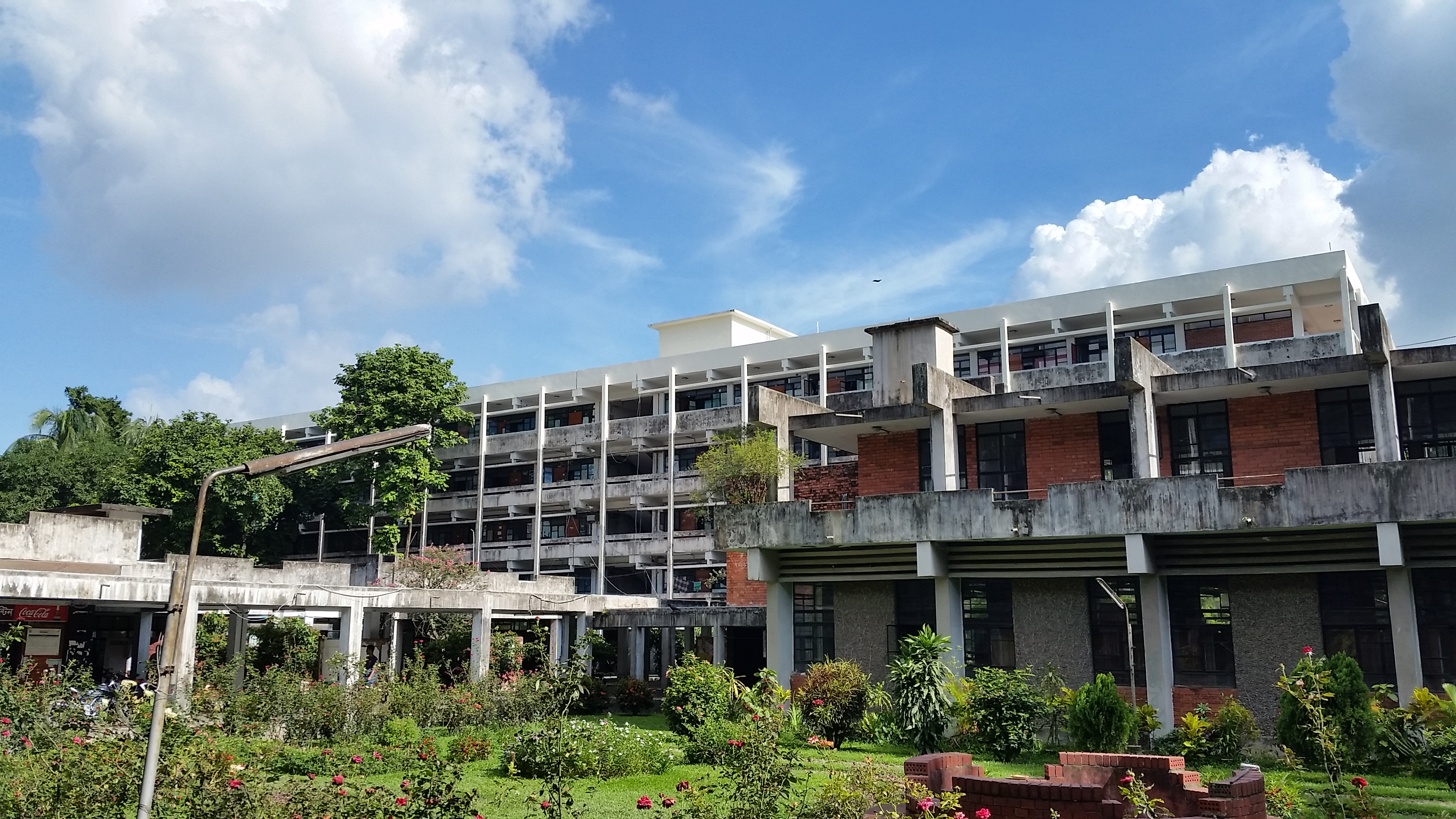
Titumir Hall, one of the eight dormitories of the university

There are nine residence halls for BUET students. Most are named after eminent figures in the history of Bangladesh:

- Ahsanullah Hall (named after Nawab of Dhaka, Nawab Bahadur Sir Khwaja Ahsanullah)
- Titumir Hall (named after Bengali Muslim revolutionary Syed Mir Nisar Ali Titumir)
- Sabekun Nahar Sony Hall, Formerly Chattri Hall (Named after Sabekun Nahar Sony, who died being caught between gunfighting between political groups in BUET at 2002)
- Shadhinata Hall (Previously: Bangamata Sheikh Fojilatunnesa Mujib Hall)
- Dr. M. A. Rashid Hall (named after M. A. Rashid, the first vice-chancellor of the university)
- Kazi Nazrul Islam Hall (named after the National Poet of Bangladesh Kazi Nazrul Islam)
- Sher-e-Bangla Hall (named after the 1st Prime Minister of Bengal- Sher-e-Bangla A. K. Fazlul Huq)
- Suhrawardy Hall (named after the Bengali-nationalist leader and 5th Prime-minister of Pakistan Huseyn Shaheed Suhrawardy)
- Shahid Smrity Hall (named in memory of martyrs of the Bangladesh Liberation War)

The administrative head of a residence hall is its provost, usually chosen from the senior teachers of different faculties. Three Assistant Provosts are also appointed in the hall administration.

Students who do not stay at halls of residence are facilitated by the university's own commuter buses which cover major routes of Dhaka city.

=== Sports facilities ===
BUET has a large playground at the eastern periphery of main academic campus. It is used as venue of annual athletics competition of the university as well as cricket, football, and hockey competitions. Students can access the facility all year round. Besides, visiting foreign national football teams as well as few top football clubs of Bangladesh sometimes use this ground for practice sessions. The playground is also used as venue of alumni reunions. BUET has tennis court in the main academic area. It also has a gymnasium near halls of residence where students can do gymnastics and play basketball during leisure.

== Awards and achievements ==
- CSE, BUET students have achieved extraordinary feat since its participation at 1998 Atlanta ACM International Collegiate Programming Contest. BUET was the first University from Bangladesh as well as South Asia along with the North South University, Bangladesh to participate in World Finals of such an Prestigious Programming Competition. Best Ranking in ACM ICPC World Finals was 11.

Following is the position of BUET in ICPC world finals over the years:

Year	Rank	Questions solved	Year	Rank	Questions solved
2021	24 (AWC)	07	2011	HM	–
2019	62	04	2012	HM	–
2018	56	04	2013	60	03
2017	HM	–	2014	19	03
2016	NQ	–	2015	NQ	–
2010	36	04	2009	34	04
2008	31	04	2007	HM	–
2006	39	02	2005	29	04
2004	NQ	–	2003	HM	–
2002	HM	–	2001	29	03
2000	11	06	1999	HM	–
1998	24	03			

*AWC = Asia-West Champion; HM = Unranked but Honourable Mention; NQ = Not Qualified

- Teams from BUET became first and third around the globe in the inaugural International Conference on Acoustics, Speech, and Signal Processing in the 2014 IEEE Signal Processing Cup (SP Cup) at the ICASSP in 2014, and second and fifth place in IEEE SP Cup 2015 and again followed by the Grand Prize (1st place) in IEEE SP Cup 2016. Recently, teams from the EEE department are also participating in the IEEE Video and Image Processing Cup (IEEE VIP Cup) since 2017. In 2017 BUET achieved 1st and 3rd place in IEEE VIP cup among more than 200 teams around the world.
- BUET teams participated in the IEEE Myron Zucker Student Design Contest in 2001, placed first, Chicago, United States.
- Graduate alumnus of BUET was recognized by American Society of Civil Engineers as one of the 10 new faces of 2016 in Outstanding Projects and Leaders (OPAL) awards 2016.
- BUET teams participated in the Asia-Pacific Robot Contest ABU ROBOCON 2005 Beijing and was awarded the Panasonic Award.
- BUET student won the 2006 IEEE Region 10 Student Paper Contest.
- BUET won the Student Enterprise Award in 2007 from IEEE.
- BUET won the IEEE Vibrant Student Branch Award 2008 in IEEE Region 10 Student Congress in 2007 from IEEE.
- BUET reached "partial double octo-final" round in open break category (44th among 400 teams) at the 36th World Universities Debating Championship 2016.
- A team from BUET became category champion in NASA apps contest in 2020.
- BUET's Mars Rover Team participated in the International Planetary Aerial System Challenge (IPAS) 2021 and was awarded the Innovation Award.

== Notable alumni ==
A lot of alumni have been recognized nationally and internationally based on their notable works on fields like engineering, science, politics, literature, jurnalism and so on. Some notable alumnai are architect Fazlur Rahman Khan, national professor and engineer Jamilur Reza Choudhury, water resource and climate change specialist Ainun Nishat, writer and journalist Anisul Haque, and politician and former Minister of Information Hasanul Haq Inu. Apart from them, actress Opi Karim, architect and actor Tauquir Ahmed, drama actor Abul Hayat are some popular faces in Bangladeshi culture and entertainment.

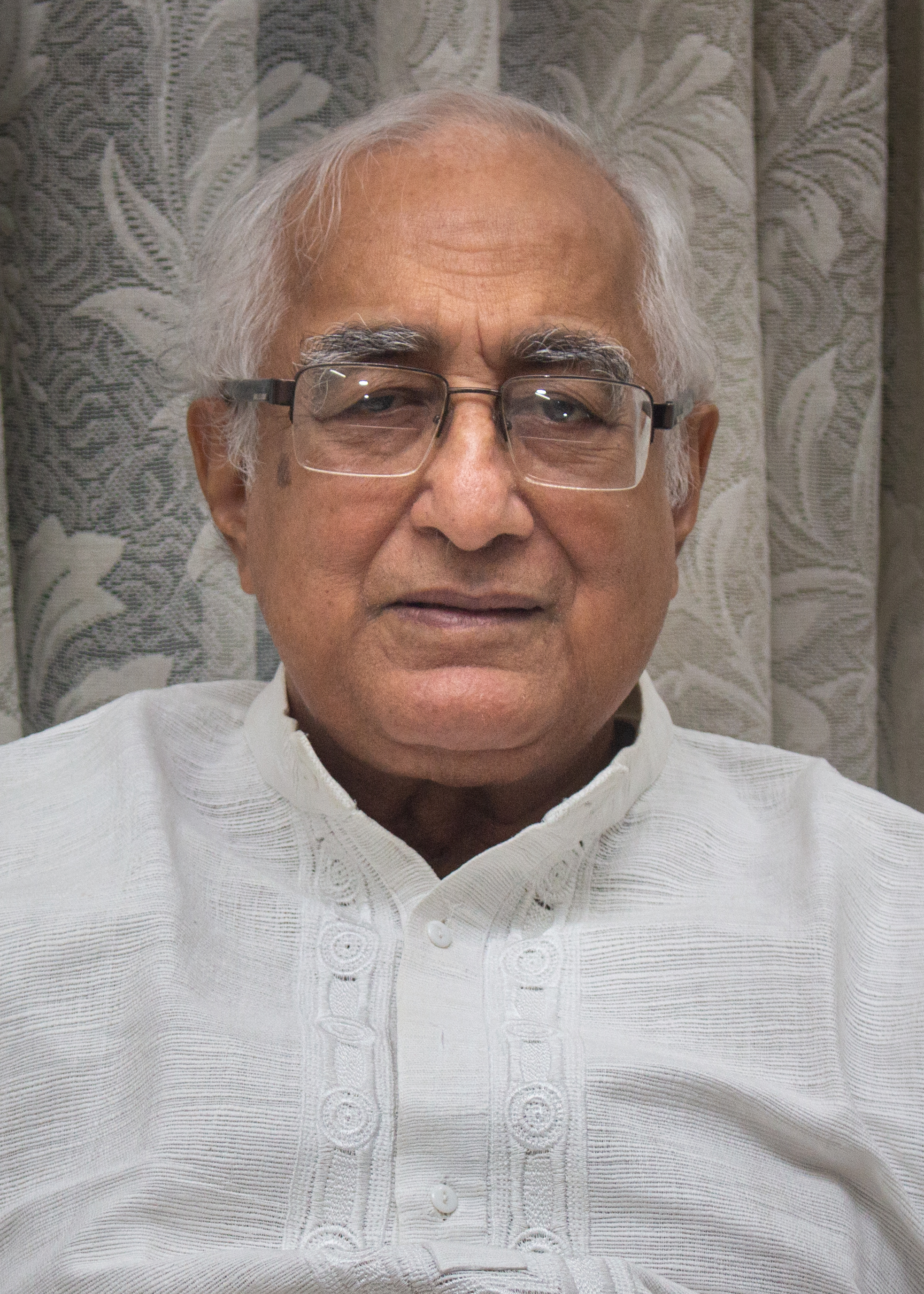
Jamilur Reza Choudhury, Civil engineer, academic, former adviser in caretaker government, and vice chancellor

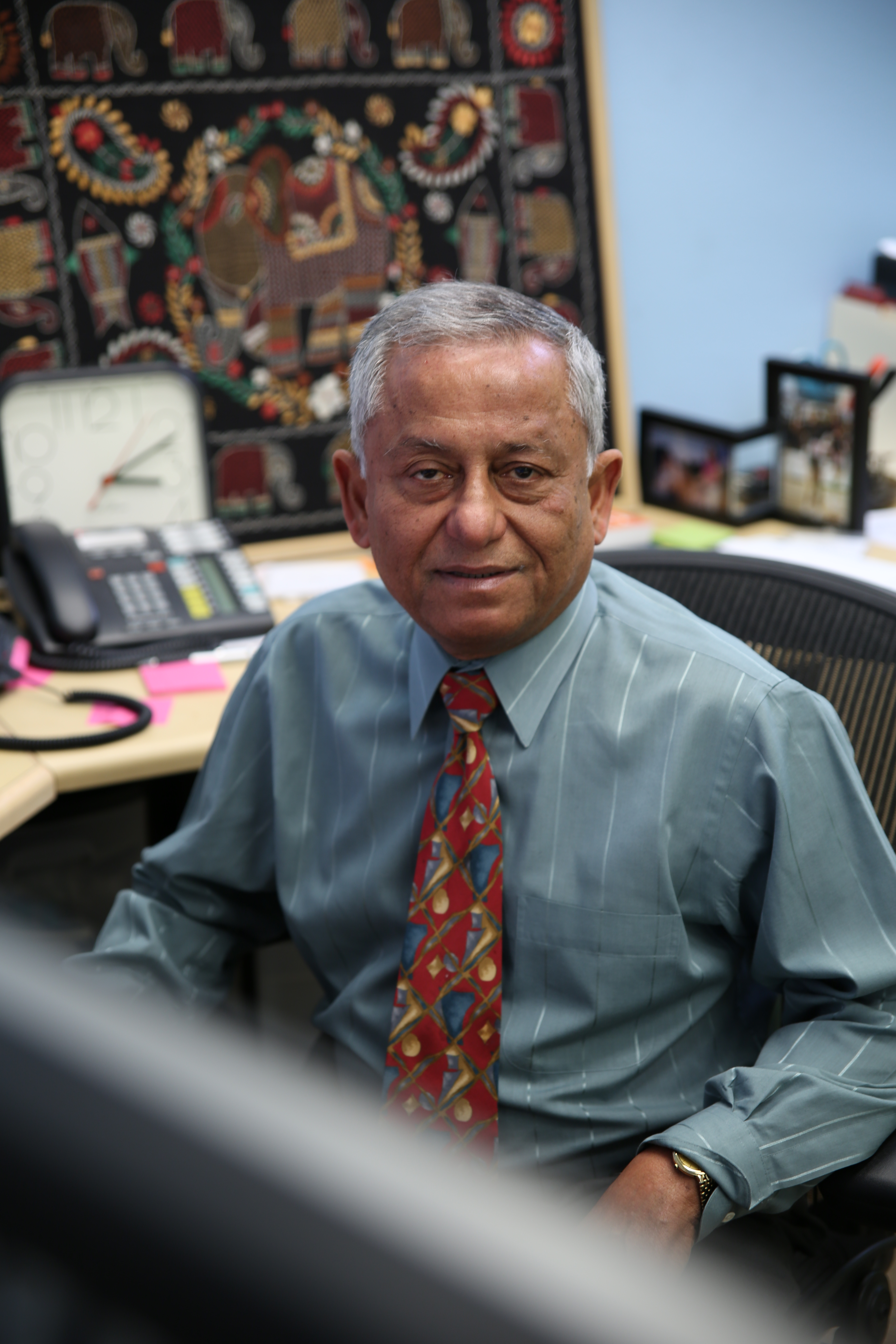
A. K. M. Fazle Hussain, Mechanical engineer and fluid dynamics expert, longtime professor in the U.S.; recognized for contributions in turbulence, vortex dynamics

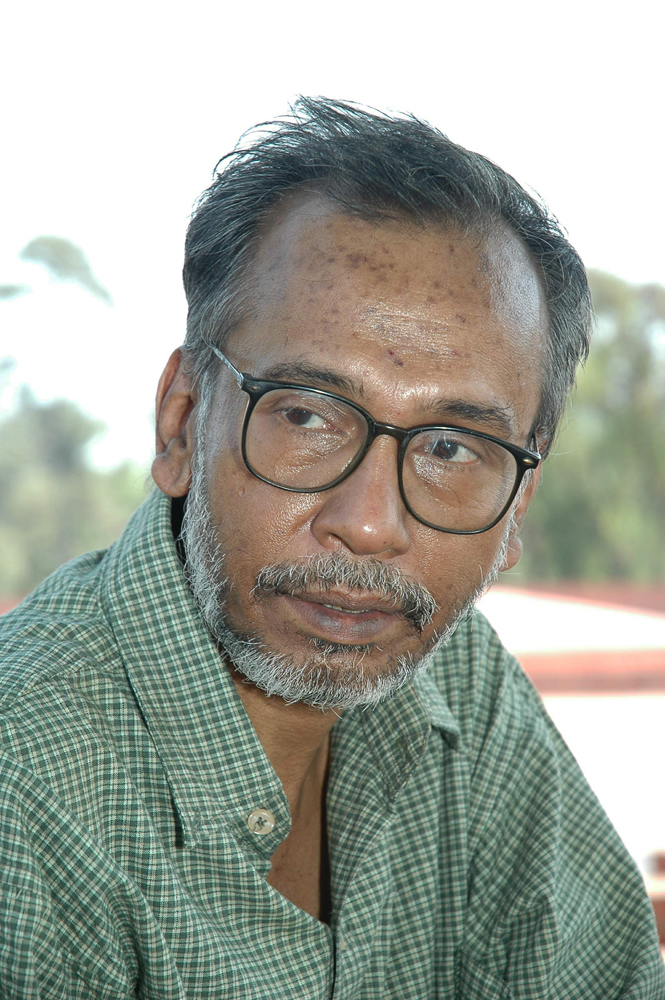
Syed Mainul Hossain, Structural engineer/architect, known for designing the National Martyrs' Memorial in Bangladesh

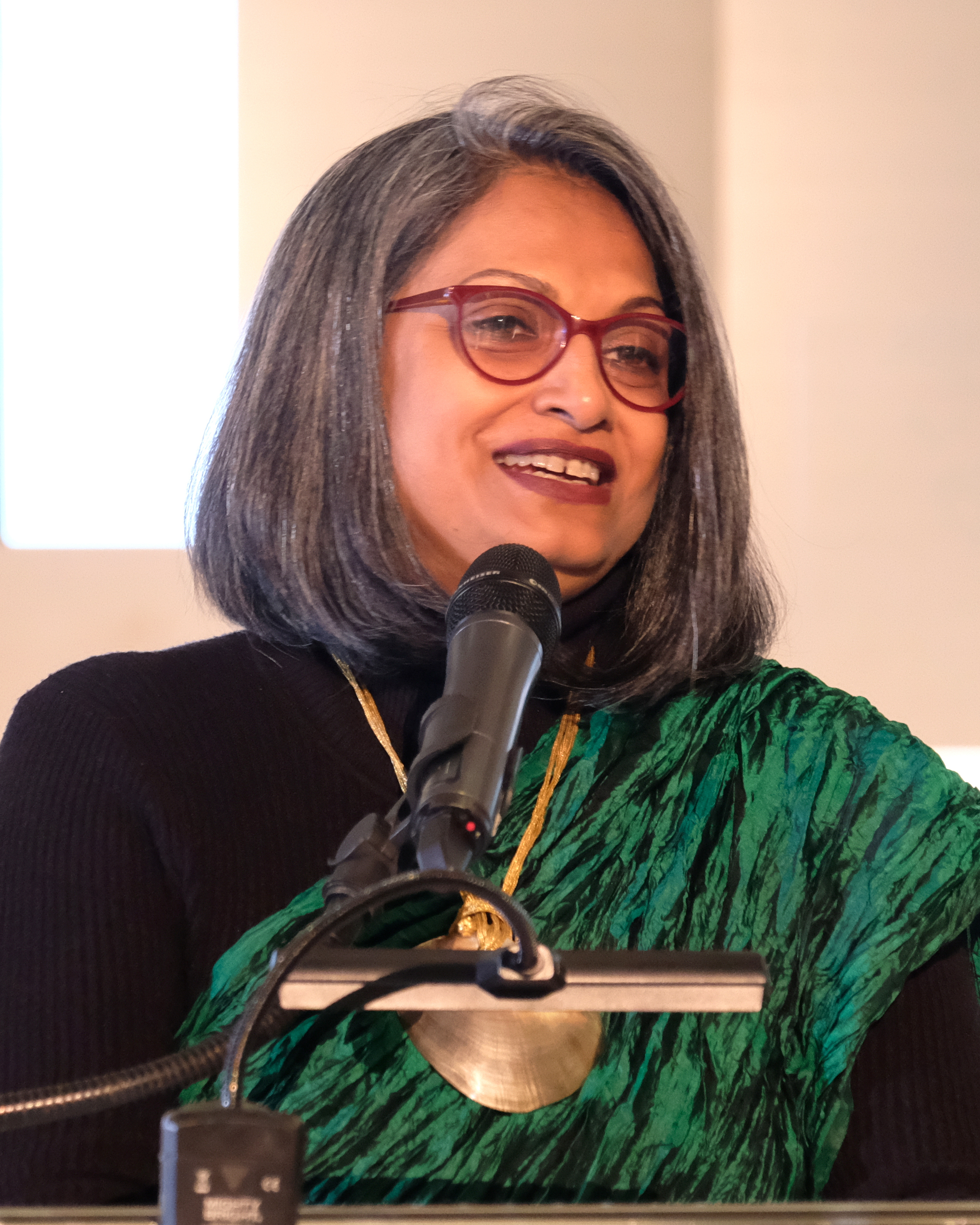
Marina Tabassum, Architect, known for contemporary architecture in Bangladesh

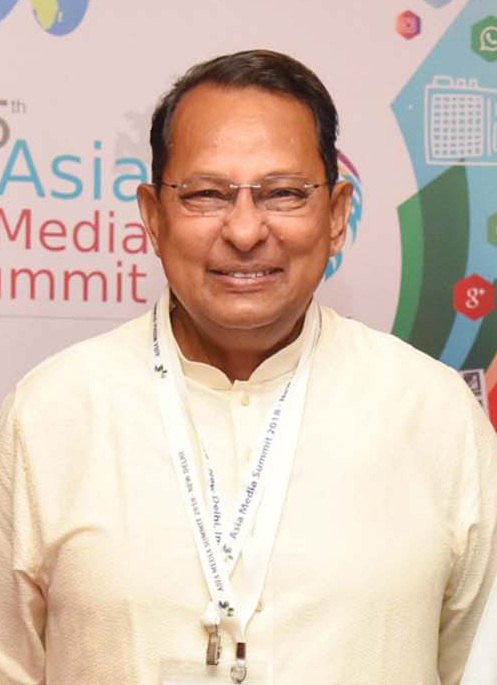
Hasanul Haq Inu, Politician and former Information Minister of Bangladesh

== Criticism ==
=== Student politics and safety ===
There are examples of multiple violent events that took place during different political regime. In 2002 during the internal conflict of two students wing of JCD, a second year student of chemical engineering department, namely Sabekun Nahar Sonny was shot to death in front of Ahsanullah hall. In 2013, a student Arif Rayhan Dip affiliated with BCL, was killed by extremist. In 2019, a second year student of EEE department Abrar Fahad, was beaten to death by the BCL affiliated student wing based on a facebook post. However, student and teacher politics had been banned after that event and it is still banned now.

=== Brain drain and Economic consequences ===
After graduation a huge portion of BUET graduates (50-60%) go abroad for higher education (mainly Europe and the USA) and most of them never return.

== See also ==
- List of dental schools in Bangladesh
- List of medical colleges in Bangladesh
- List of universities in Bangladesh
- University of Dhaka
- Khulna University of Engineering & Technology
- Dhaka University of Engineering & Technology
- Chittagong University of Engineering & Technology
- Rajshahi University of Engineering & Technology
