= Md. Habibur Rahman (academic) =

Vice-Chancellor of Dhaka University of Engineering & Technology, Gazipur
- In office 17 November 2020 – 14 August 2024
- Preceded by: Mohammed Alauddin
- Succeeded by: Mohammad Zoynal Abedin

Md. Habibur Rahman is a Bangladeshi academic and a former vice-chancellor of Dhaka University of Engineering & Technology, Gazipur. He is the former chairman of the Dhaka Water Supply and Sewerage Authority. Additionally, he was a professor of Bangladesh University of Engineering and Technology.

== Early life ==
Rahman completed his bachelor's and master's in engineering and civil engineering at the Bangladesh University of Engineering and Technology in 1982 and 1984, respectively. He completed his PhD at the University of Strathclyde in 1989.

== Career ==
S. M. Nazrul Islam, vice-chancellor of Bangladesh University of Engineering and Technology, created controversy the day he took office on August 30, 2010 as the vice-chancellor. He assigned, Kamal Ahammad, a non-statutory deputy registrar, in charge of the registrar as an additional duty. In April 2012, Bangladesh University of Engineering and Technology Teachers Association launched agitation bringing 16 allegations against Islam and pro-vice-chancellor M Habibur Rahman. The association alleged that the appointment of Rahman to the post of Pro-VC was based solely on his political affiliations. On September 3, 2012, the students of BUET burnt effigies of Islam and Rahman on the campus demanding their resignation. In September 2012, Rahman was removed from the post of pro-vice chancellor of Bangladesh University of Engineering and Technology following protests by students and faculty members of the university. They were also demanding the removal of Vice Chancellor SM Nazrul Islam.

Rahman was appointed chairman of Dhaka Water Supply and Sewerage Authority in September 2016. He was appointed three years after Mohammad Rahmatullah left the post. He was a good friend of Taqsem A Khan, the managing director of Dhaka WASA, who received a good score from Rahman. He reappointed Khan multiple times to the post of managing director. He resigned before completing his term and was replaced by Gholam Mostofa who made accusations of corruption against Taqsem A Khan to the Ministry of Local Government, Rural Development and Co-operatives. Mostofa was replaced by Sujit Kumar Bala.

Rahman was appointed the vice-chancellor of Dhaka University of Engineering & Technology, Gazipur in November 2020.
