= Dhaka University of Engineering & Technology, Gazipur =

Public university in Gazipur, Bangladesh

- ঢাকা প্রকৌশল ও প্রযুক্তি বিশ্ববিদ্যালয়, গাজীপুর
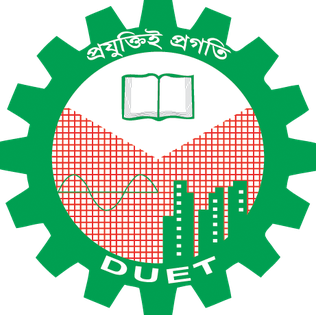
- Crest of DUET
- Other name: DUET
- Former names: College of Engineering, Faculty of Engineering, University of Dhaka (1980-1981); Dhaka Engineering College (1981-1986); Bangladesh Institute of Technology (BIT), Dhaka (1986-2003)
- Motto: "প্রযুক্তিই প্রগতি"
- Motto in English: "Technology is the advancement"
- Type: Public, Research
- Established: 1980; 46 years ago as Engineering College; 1986; 40 years ago as BIT, Dhaka; 2003; 23 years ago as DUET
- Accreditation: Institution of Engineers, Bangladesh; Institute of Architects Bangladesh; Institution of Textile Engineers and Technologists; Bangladesh Institute of Planners
- Affiliations: University Grants Commission (UGC)
- Endowment: ৳ 976 million (2026–27) ($7.95 million)
- Chancellor: President Mirza Fakhrul Islam Alamgir
- Vice-Chancellor: Mohammad Iqbal
- Academic staff: 282+ (2025)
- Administrative staff: 176+ (2025)
- Total staff: Around 780
- Students: 3849+ (2025)
- Undergraduates: Around 3050
- Postgraduates: Around 650
- Doctoral students: Around 100
- Location: Gazipur, 1707, Bangladesh; 24.019290°N 90.417899°E
- Campus: Main campus 23.42 acres (9.48 ha) Second campus 13 acres (5.3 ha); Urban
- Language: English
- Website: duet.ac.bd

University rankings

Regional – Overall
- QS Asia: 486 (2026)

Dhaka University of Engineering & Technology, Gazipur (Bengali: ঢাকা প্রকৌশল ও প্রযুক্তি বিশ্ববিদ্যালয়, গাজীপুর), commonly known as DUET, formerly BIT Dhaka, is a public engineering and technological research university in Gazipur, Bangladesh, which focuses on the study of engineering and architecture. DUET is one of the top engineering PhD granting research universities in Bangladesh. It requires diploma engineers candidates, graduated from polytechnic institutes or technical schools affiliated with the Bangladesh Technical Education Board for undergraduate enrollment. DUET is one of the five PhD granting engineering research universities of Bangladesh along with BUET, KUET, CUET, and RUET.

Most of the existing 16 departments under 4 faculties offer both undergraduate and postgraduate degrees, including Ph.D. (Doctor of Philosophy) programs. Apart from the faculties, there are also three institutes that offer postgraduate degrees and emphasize research.

About a total of 3,500+ students are currently pursuing undergraduate and postgraduate studies. The current per-year intake of undergraduate students is around 800, and graduate students in master's and PhD programs are about 240. Every year, around 800 students enroll in undergraduate programs to study engineering and architecture.

There are around 300 or more teachers. Only those who have a diploma in engineering can enroll for a bachelor's degree in engineering and architecture.

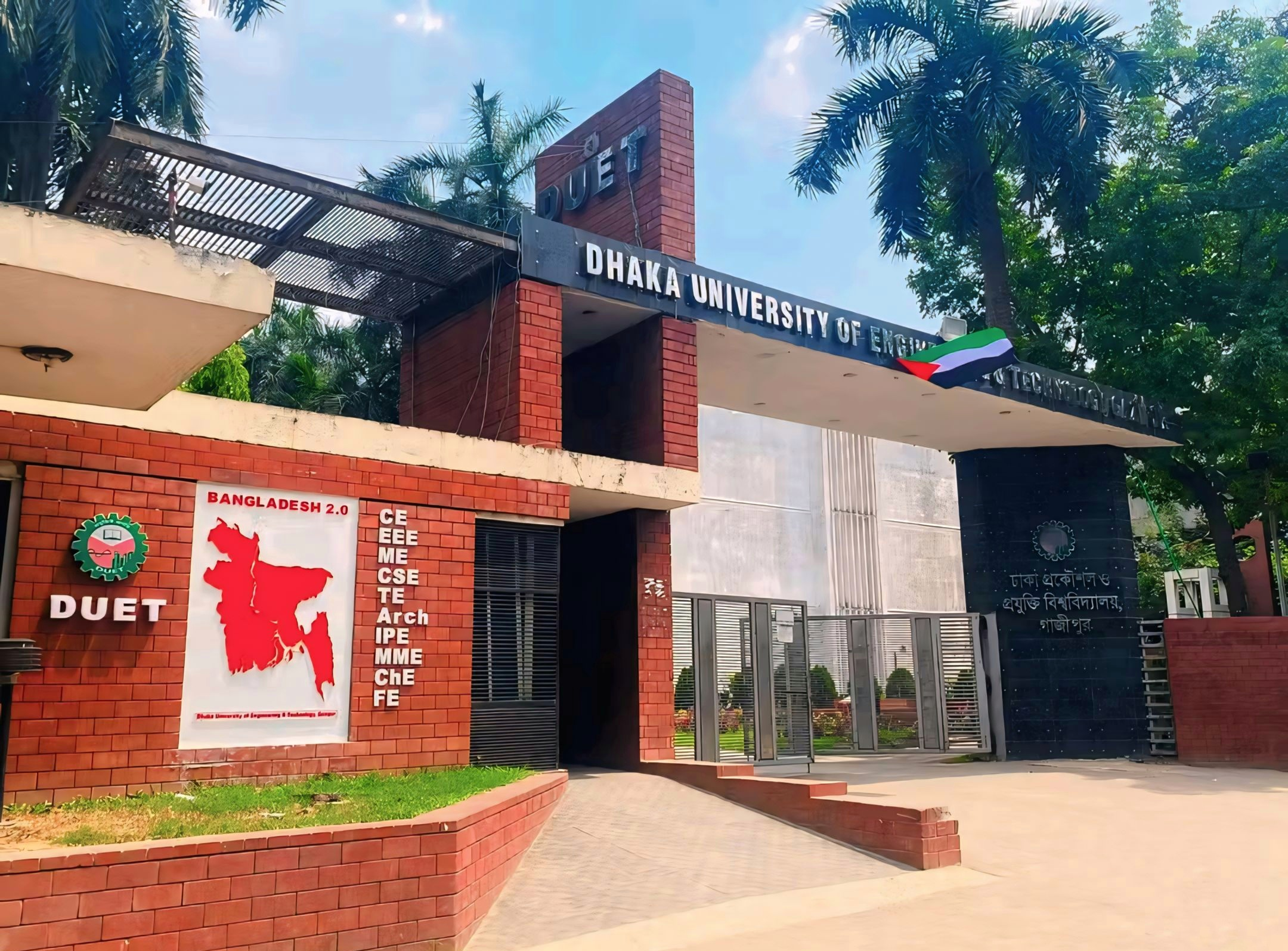
The Entrance Gate of DUET

== History ==
The university originated in 1980 as the College of Engineering at its temporary campus at Tejgaon, Dhaka, under the University of Dhaka, offering four-year bachelor's degrees in civil, electrical and electronic, and mechanical engineering. After a short time, the College of Engineering was renamed Dhaka Engineering College (DEC). Then DEC shifted to its present permanent campus in Gazipur City in 1983.

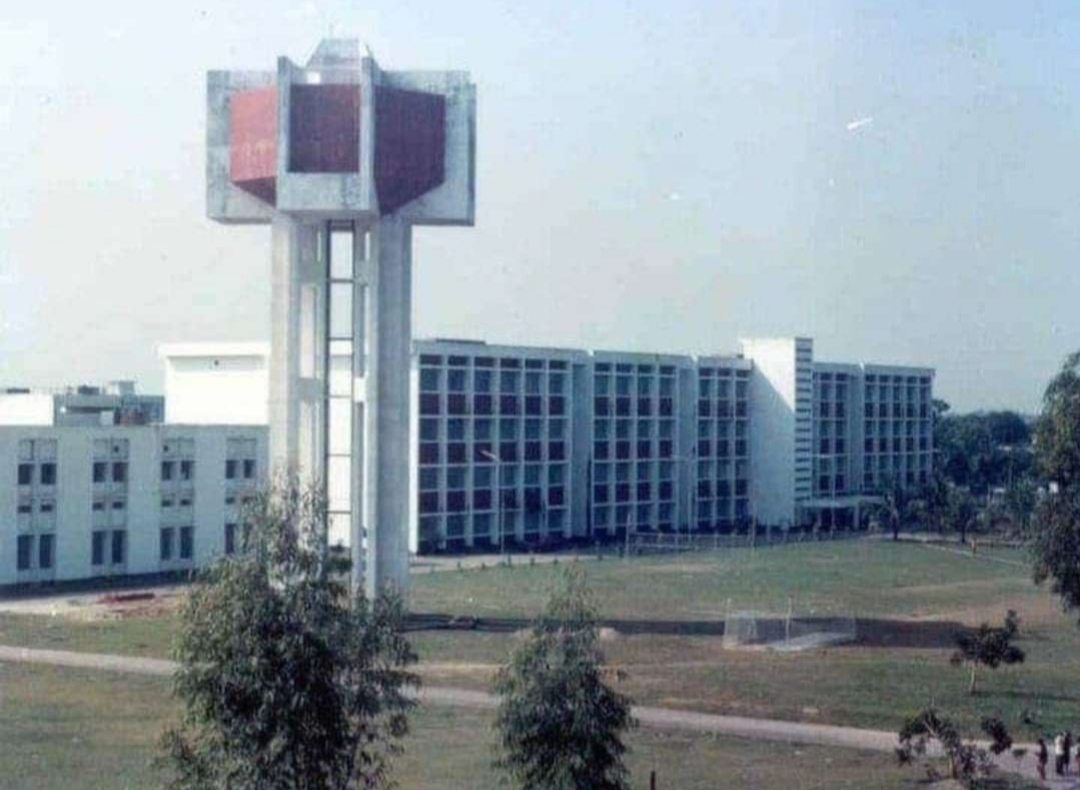
BIT, Dhaka (1986)

DEC was converted into the Bangladesh Institute of Technology (BIT), Dhaka, as a degree awarding institute by the government ordinance in 1986.

In September 2003, BIT, Dhaka became Dhaka University of Engineering & Technology, Gazipur by the "Dhaka University of Engineering and Technology, Gazipur Act, 2003" along with three other engineering universities (Chittagong University of Engineering & Technology (CUET), Khulna University of Engineering & Technology (KUET), and Rajshahi University of Engineering & Technology (RUET)). Under this act, the university became an autonomous statutory organization of the Government of the People's Republic of Bangladesh.

DUET has seen new educational expansions at its second nearby campus. Since 2020, the university has also been establishing a complete IT system that includes the BdREN network, DUET e-learning platform, institutional email, DUET gateway, and payroll systems to enable easy online communication, thus enhancing efficiency in operations. DUET offers undergraduate and graduate programs designed on an Outcome-Based Education (OBE) model, addressing the region's current and future needs. Additionally, the DUET journal, now an indexed publication, regularly publishes research articles.

== Location ==
The Dhaka University of Engineering and Technology (DUET) is situated in Gazipur District, approximately 40 km (25 mi) north of Dhaka, the capital city of Bangladesh. It is about 20 km (12 mi) away from Hazrat Shahjalal International Airport and 3 km north of Gazipur city in the Bhawal area. Gazipur is well-connected by roads and railways with Dhaka and other major cities of Bangladesh.

DUET Main & Second Campus

DUET's second campus is located on Majhir Khola Road in Gazipur, close to the main DUET campus. On the map, the main campus is shown in green, while the second campus is highlighted in red.

== Gallery ==
Several photos showcasing various aspects of the DUET campus, from the entrance to the KNI Hall.

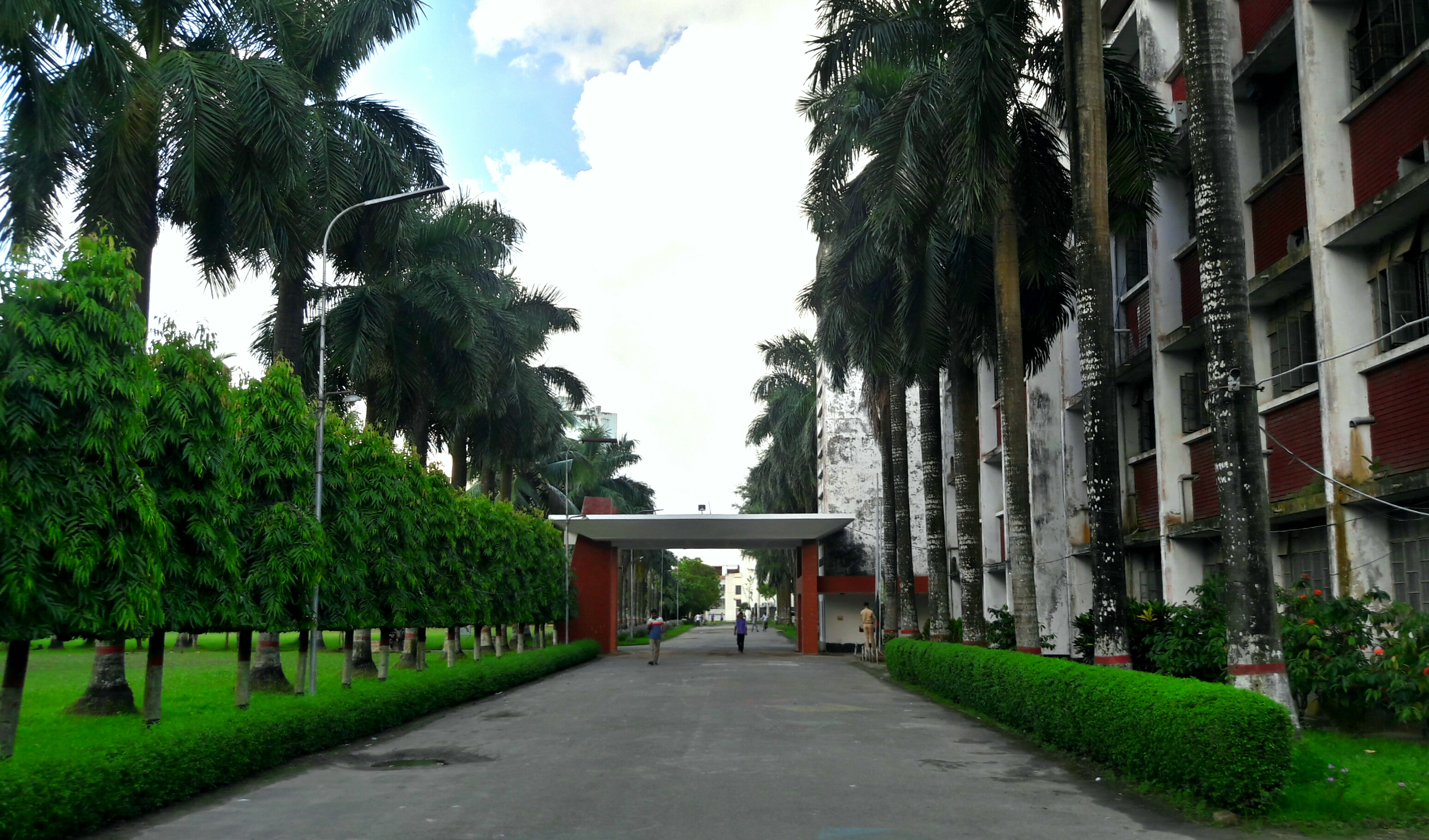
Entrance of DUET

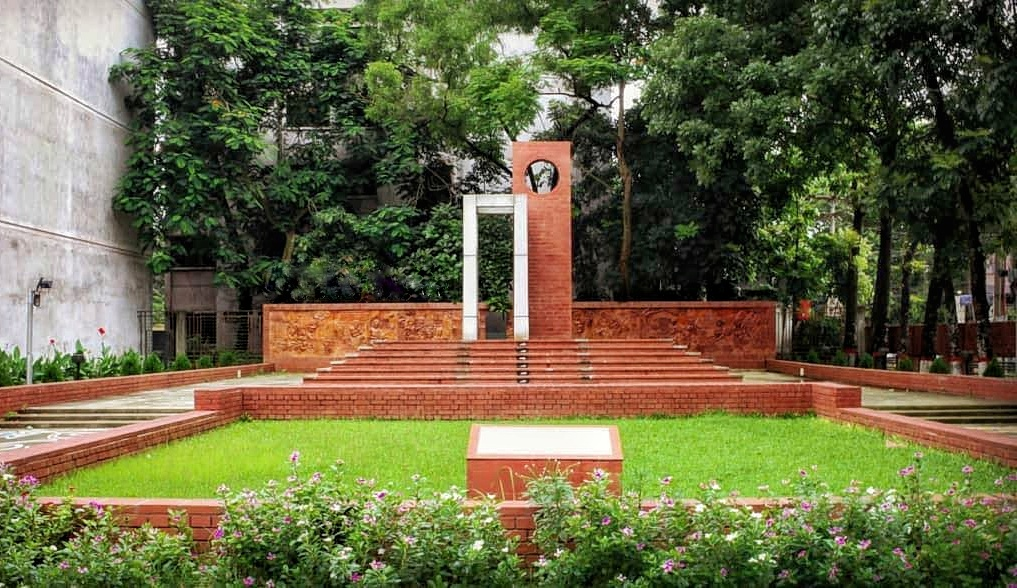
Central Shaheed Minar

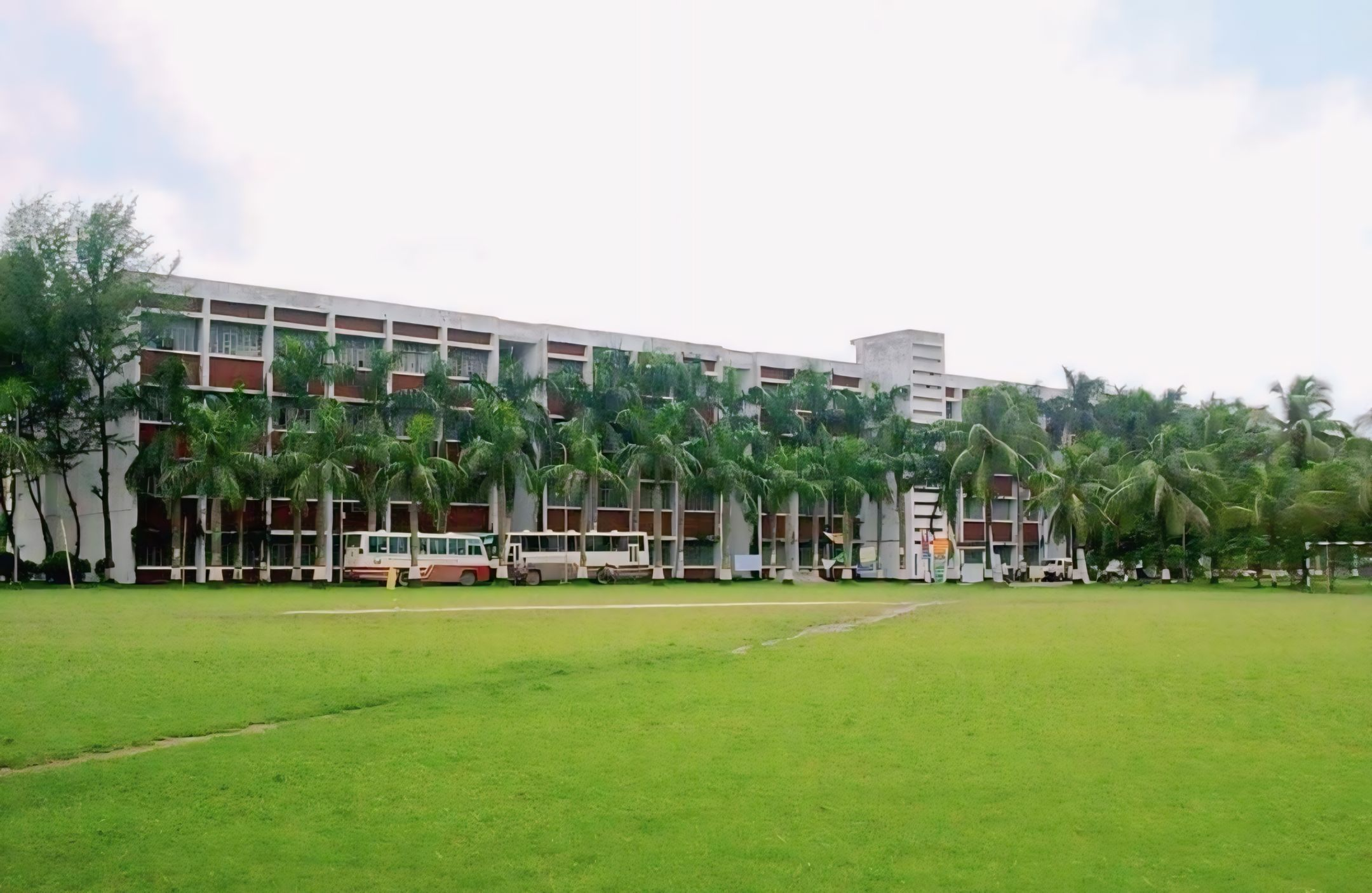
Old Academic Building

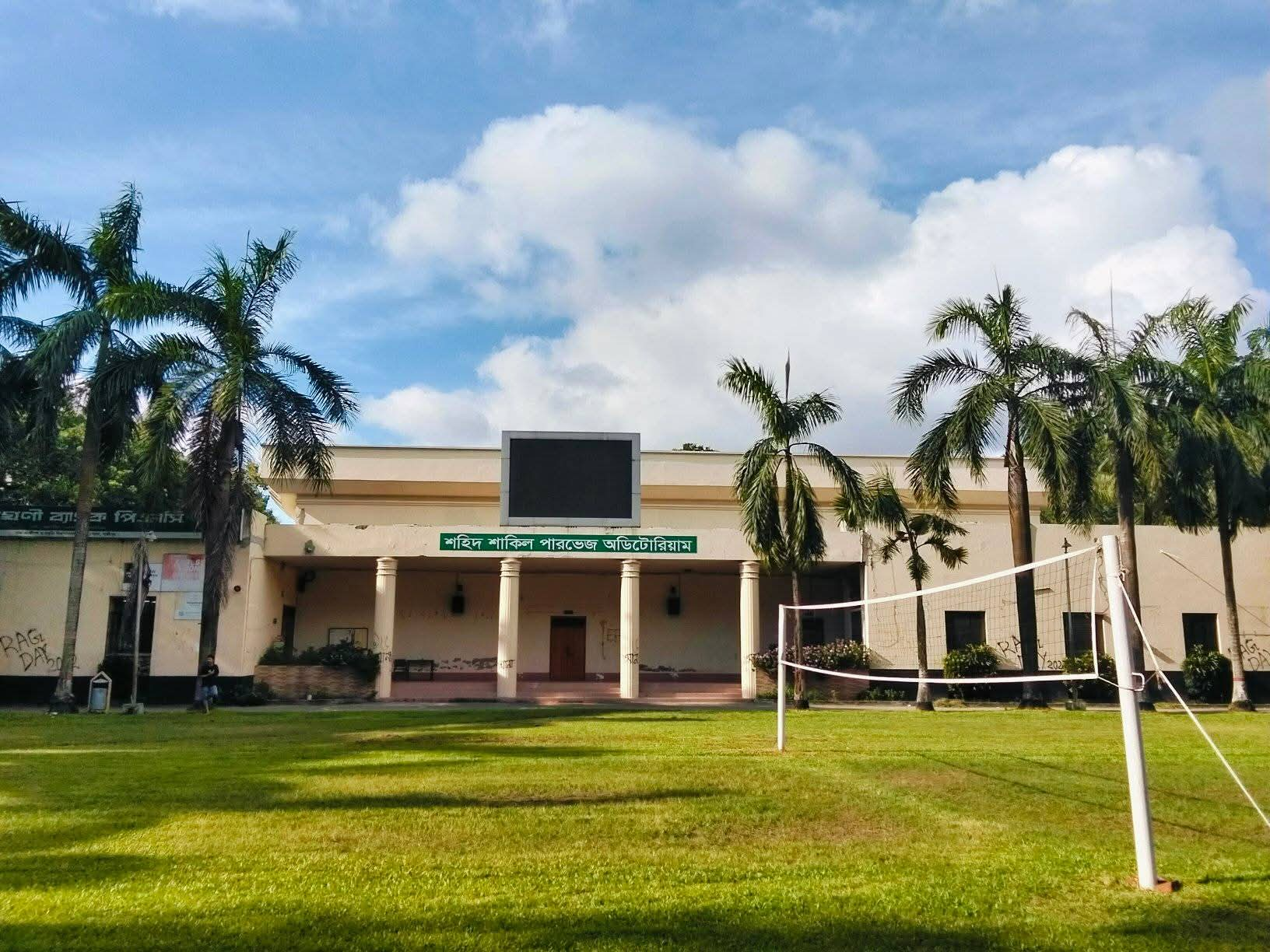
Central Auditorium

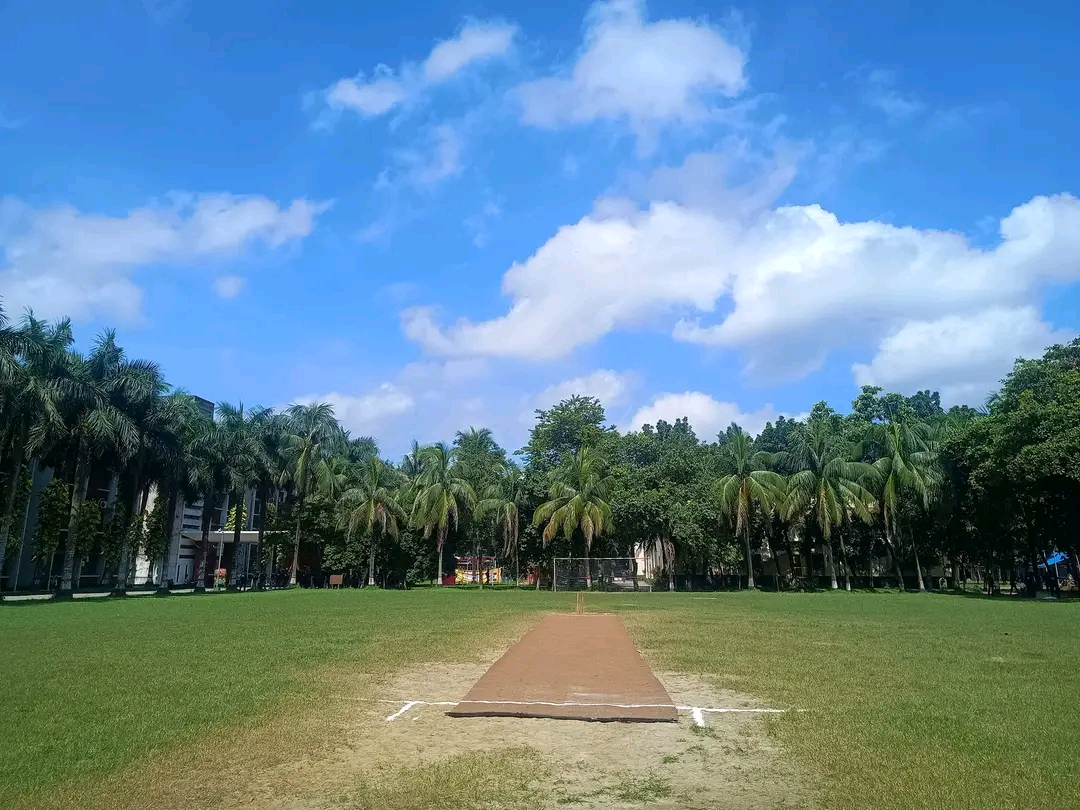
Central Field

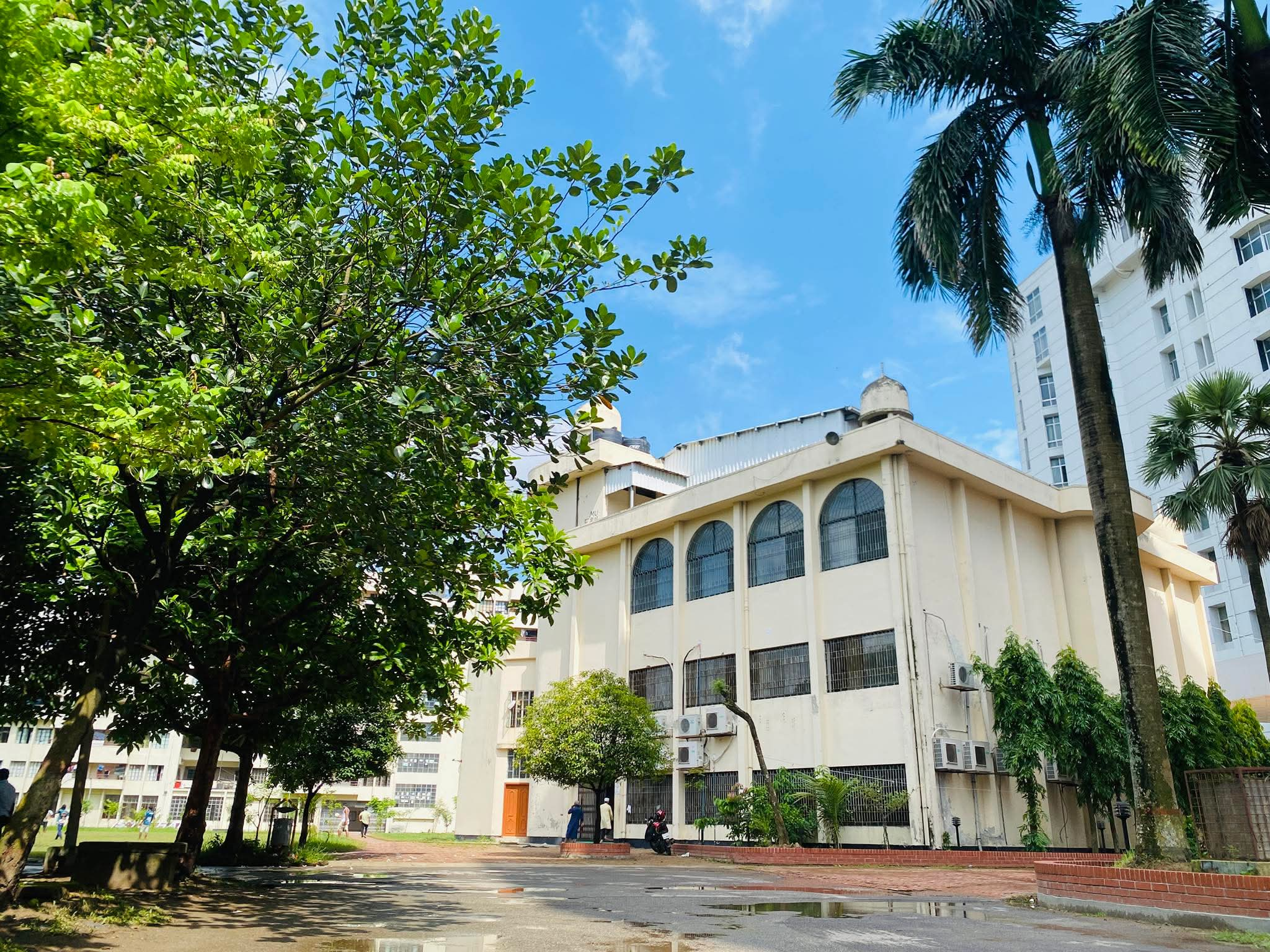
DUET Central Mosque

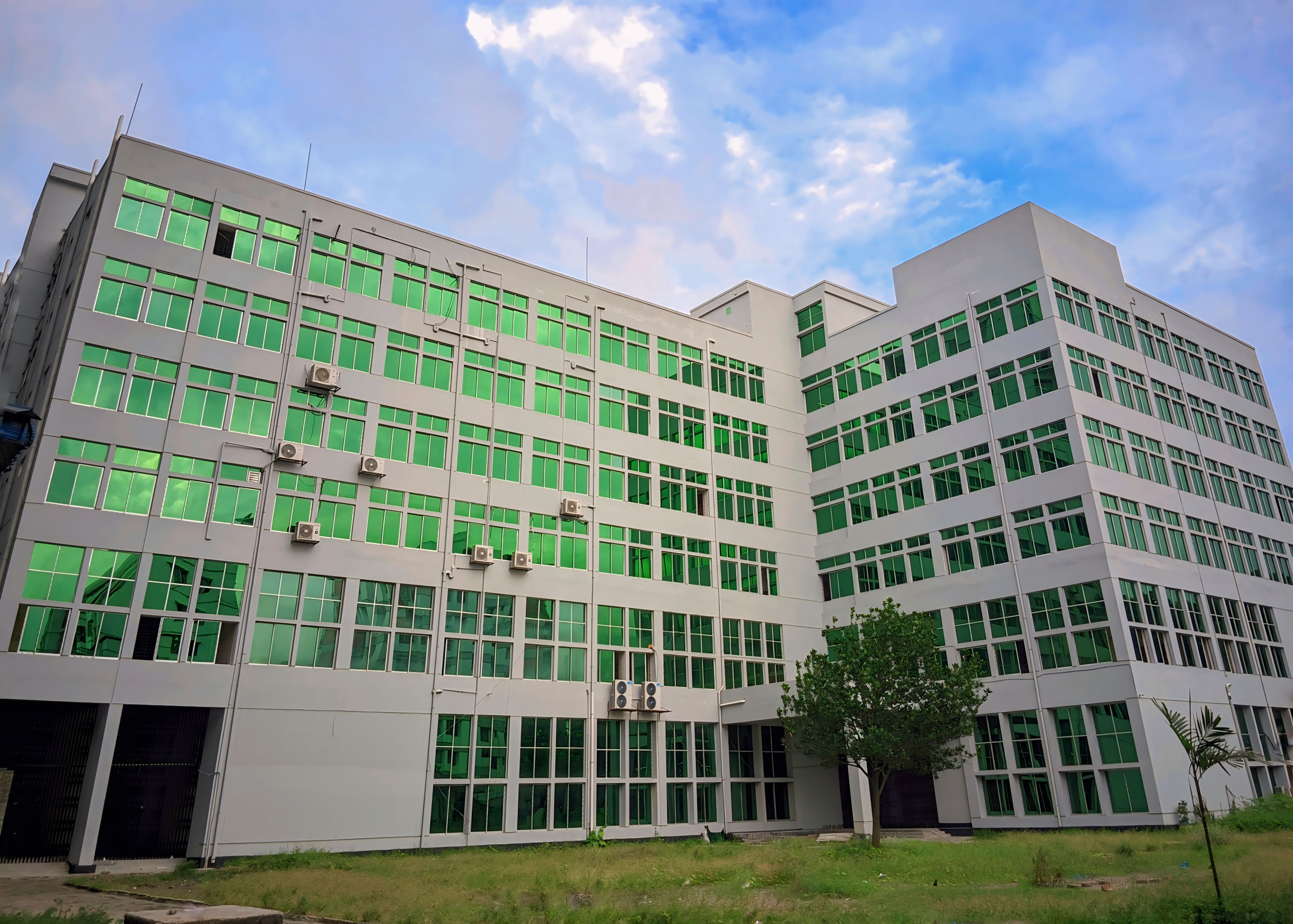
Textile Workshop Building

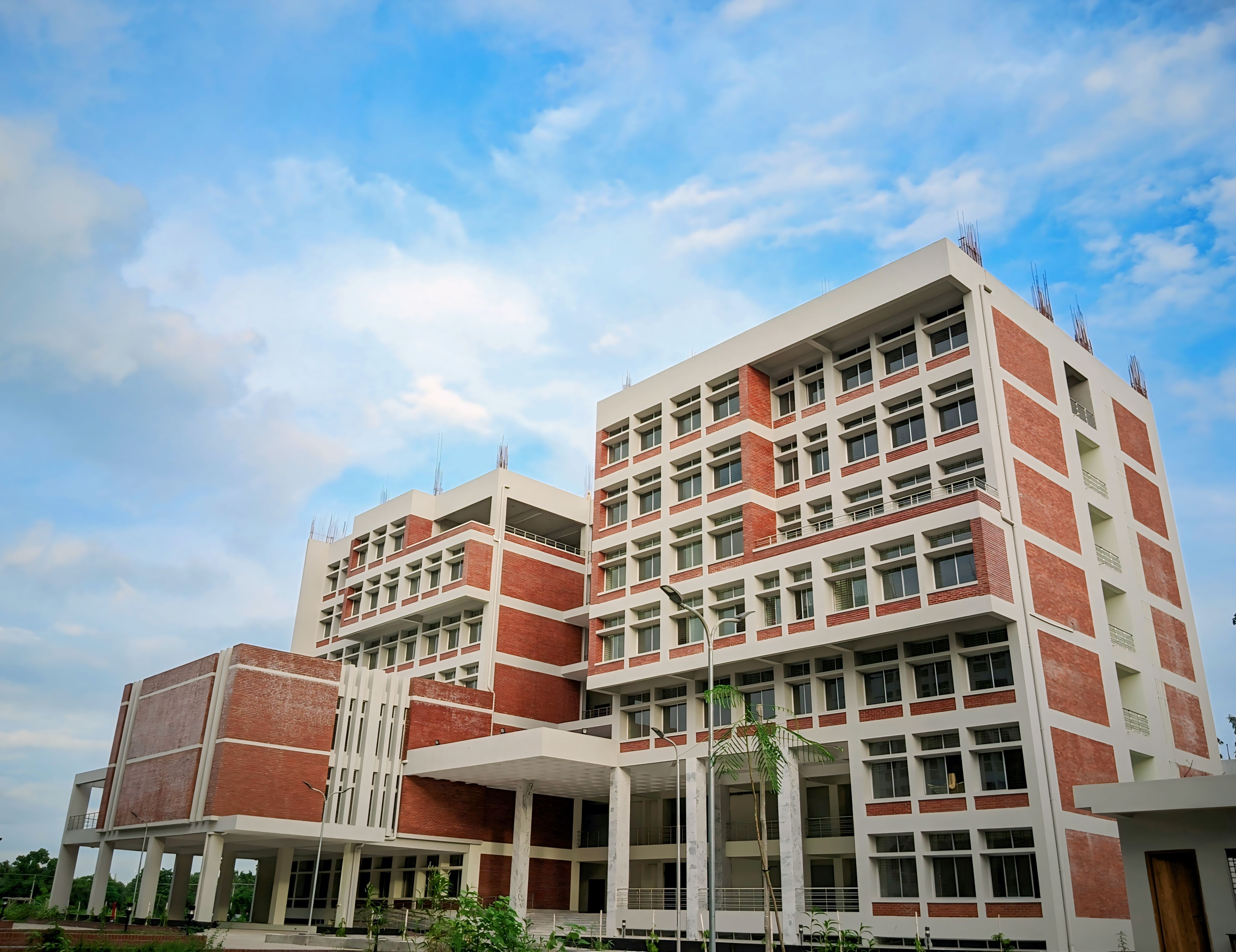
IT Business Incubator (2nd campus)

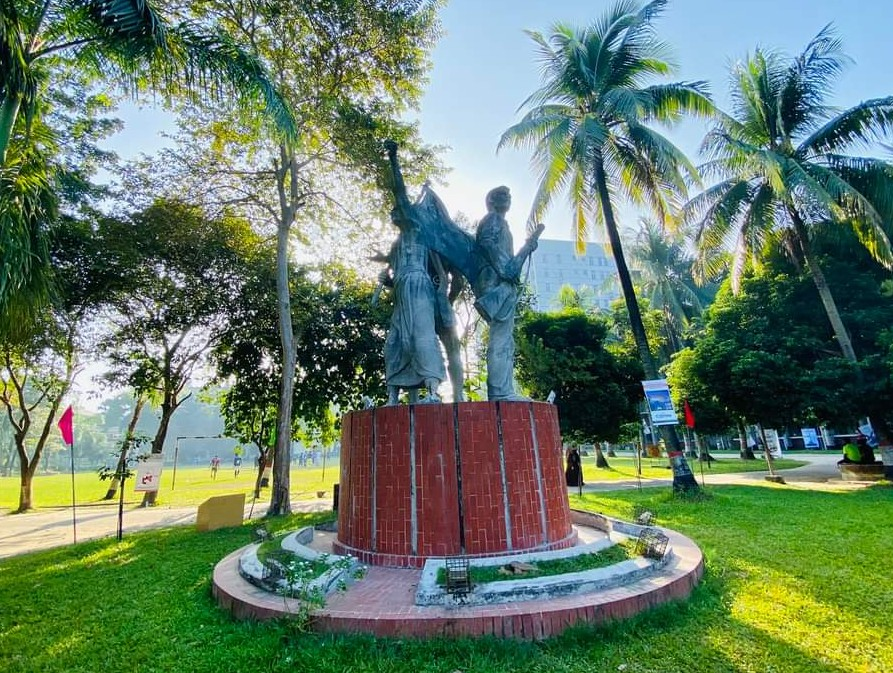
Statue of Freedom Fighter

Aerial View of DUET

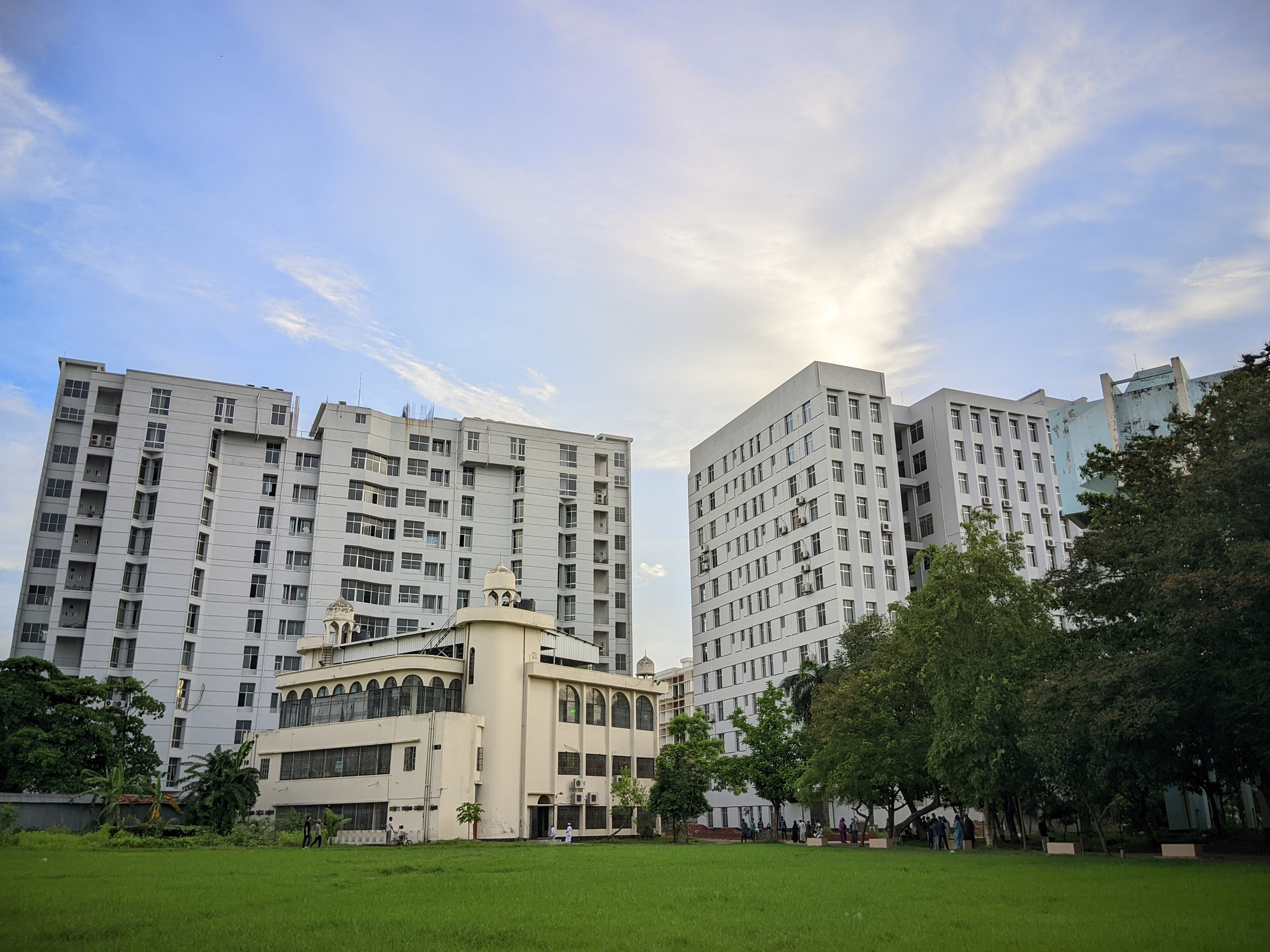
SNI Academic and SAS Administrative Building

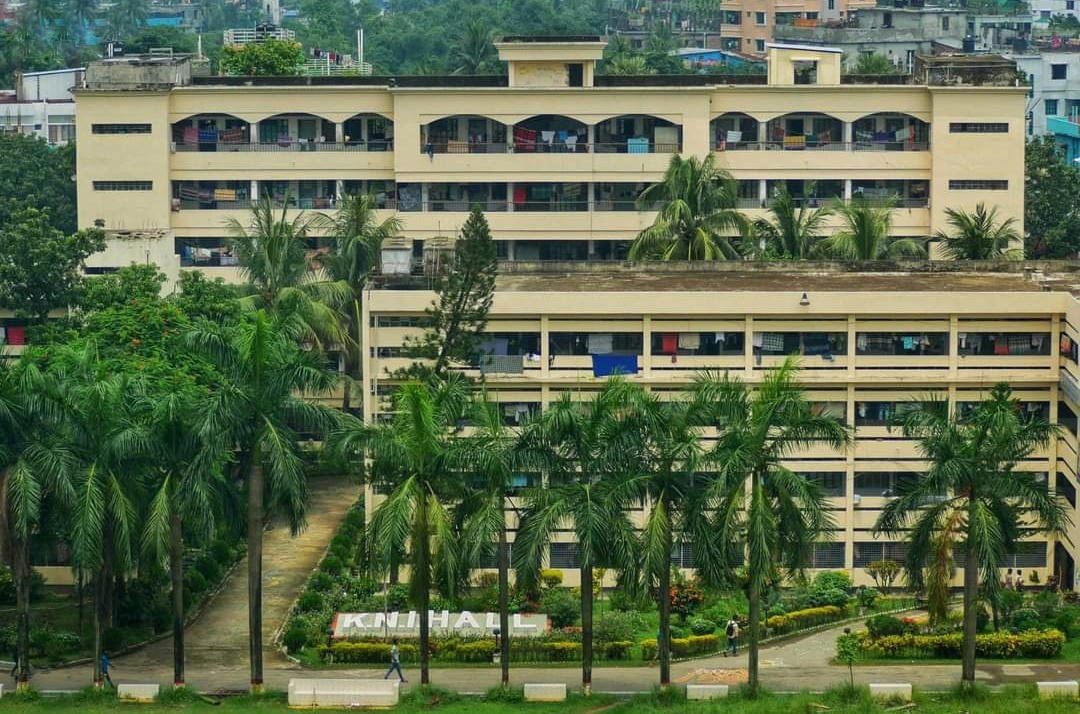
Kazi Nazrul Islam Hall (Old and Extension)

== Academics ==
DUET offers research and education through 16 departments and 3 institutes under 4 faculties, with over 266 faculty members, 151 officers, and more than 3,515 undergraduate and postgraduate students.

=== Faculties and departments ===
- Faculty of Civil Engineering
  - Department of Civil Engineering (CE)
  - Department of Architecture (Arch)
- Faculty of Electrical and Electronic Engineering
  - Department of Electrical & Electronic Engineering (EEE)
  - Department of Computer Science & Engineering (CSE)
  - Department of Bio-Medical Engineering (BME)
  - Department of Electronic & Communication Engineering (ECE)
- Faculty of Mechanical Engineering
  - Department of Mechanical Engineering (ME)
  - Department of Textile Engineering (TE)
  - Department of Food Engineering (FE)
  - Department of Chemical Engineering (ChE)
  - Department of Industrial & Production Engineering (IPE)
  - Department of Materials & Metallurgical Engineering (MME)
- Faculty of Science
  - Department of Chemistry
  - Department of Mathematics
  - Department of Physics
  - Department of Humanities & Social Sciences

=== Directorates ===
- Directorate of Center for Climate Change & Sustainability Research
- Directorate of Institute of Water and Environment
- Directorate of Institute of Energy Engineering
- Directorate of Institute of Information & Communication Technology
- Directorate of Computer Center
- Directorate of Research & Extension
- Directorate of Students' Welfare (DSW)
- Directorate of Planning and Development (P&D)
- Directorate of Transport
- Directorate of Consultancy Research Testing Service
- Directorate of Physical Education Center
- Directorate of Institutional Quality Assurance Cell

=== Journals and research bulletins ===
- DUET Journal
- DUET Bulletin
- DUET Publication

University rankings

Global – Overall
- QS World: – (2025)
- THE World: – (2025)

Global – Science and engineering
- THE Computer Science: – (2025)

Regional – Overall
- QS Asia: 486 (2025)
- THE Asia: – (2025)

=== Rankings ===
Dhaka University of Engineering and Technology (DUET) is ranked between 461st and 470th in the QS Asia University Rankings 2025. Additionally, it ranks 127th among universities in Southern Asia in the same ranking year. According to SCImago Institutions Rankings (SIR), DUET is ranked 319th in Asia and 11th among universities in Bangladesh.

== Enrollment ==
=== Undergraduate programs ===
Every year, around 750 students enroll in undergraduate programs to study engineering and architecture. There are around 300 or more teachers. Only those who have a diploma in engineering can enroll here for a bachelor's degree in engineering and architecture.

DUET offers 12 undergraduate degrees across its four faculties. Each academic year comprises two semesters. Students are generally admitted into the first year second semester class. The first semester of the first year class is exempted because candidates have already completed a minimum four-year diploma in engineering after 10 years of schooling.

Degrees offered in the following disciplines:

- Chemical Engineering
- Food Engineering
- Electrical & Electronic Engineering
- Mechanical Engineering
- Computer Science & Engineering
- Textile Engineering
- Architecture Engineering
- Industrial & Production Engineering
- Civil Engineering
- Materials and Metallurgical Engineering
- Biomedical Engineering
- Electronic & Communication Engineering

==== Number of seats ====
The number of seats for 4-year bachelor's degree programs in engineering and 5-year bachelor's degree programs in architecture are given below:

Serial	Department	Seats
1	Chemical Engineering (ChE)	30
2	Food Engineering (FE)	30
3	Electrical and Electronic Engineering (EEE)	120
4	Civil Engineering (CE)	120
5	Computer Science and Engineering (CSE)	120
6	Textile Engineering (TE)	120
7	Mechanical Engineering (ME)	120
8	Industrial and Production Engineering (IPE)	30
9	Materials and Metallurgical Engineering (MME)	30
10	Architecture (ARCH)	30
11	Biomedical Engineering (BME) (Proposed)	30
12	Electronic and Communication Engineering (ECE) (Proposed)	30
Total		810

=== Postgraduate programs ===
DUET offers postgraduate degrees across its four faculties, including master's and doctoral programs. The university provides master's (Master's degree) and doctoral (Doctor of Philosophy) programs. The university provides M.Sc. Engg. (Master of Science in Engineering), M.Engg. (Master of Engineering), M.Phil. (Master of Philosophy), MBA (Master of Business Administration), MA (Master of Arts), and Ph.D. degrees in engineering, science, and interdisciplinary fields.

==== Degrees ====
DUET awards the following postgraduate degrees:

- Master of Science in Engineering (M.Sc. Engg.)
- Master of Engineering (M.Engg.)
- Master of Science (M.Sc.)
- Master of Philosophy (M.Phil.)
- Master of Business Administration (MBA)
- Master of Arts (MA)
- Doctor of Philosophy (Ph.D.)
- Postgraduate Diploma programs offered by specialized institutes

These degrees are available in major engineering disciplines (civil, electrical and electronic, mechanical, computer science and engineering, textile, industrial and production, and food engineering), as well as in sciences (chemistry, mathematics, and physics), humanities, and interdisciplinary fields.

==== Institutes ====
Several postgraduate programs are also offered through DUET's institutes, including:

- Institute of Water and Environment (IWE)
- Institute of Information and Communication Technology (IICT)
- Institute of Energy Engineering (IEE)

Each institute provides master's and postgraduate diploma programs relevant to their specialized fields.

==== Degrees Offered by Different Departments ====
Master of Science in Engineering (M.Sc. Engg.) and Master of Engineering (M.Engg.) Degree Program:

Department	Degrees Offered
Department of Civil Engineering	M.Sc. Engg. (Civil & Environmental); M.Sc. Engg. (Civil & Geotechnical); M.Sc. Engg. (Civil & Structural); M.Sc. Engg. (Civil & Transportation); M.Sc. Engg. (Civil & Water Resources); M.Sc. Engg. (Environmental); M.Sc. Engg. in Climate Change (Water and Environment); M.Engg. (Civil & Environmental); M.Engg. (Civil & Geotechnical); M.Engg. (Civil & Structural); M.Engg. (Civil & Transportation); M.Engg. (Civil & Water Resources); M.Engg. (Environmental); M.Engg. in Climate Change (Water and Environment)
Department of Electrical and Electronic Engineering	M.Sc. Engg. (EEE); M.Engg. (EEE)
Department of Mechanical Engineering	M.Sc. Engg. (ME); M.Engg. (ME)
Department of Computer Science and Engineering	M.Sc. Engg. (CSE); M.Engg. (CSE)
Department of Textile Engineering	M.Sc. Engg. (TE); M.Engg. (TE)
Department of Food Engineering	M.Sc. Engg. (FE); M.Engg. (FE)
Department of Industrial and Production Engineering	M.Sc. Engg. (IPE); M.Engg. (IPE)

Master of Science (M.Sc.) and Master of Philosophy (M.Phil.) Degree Program:

Department	Degrees Offered
Department of Chemistry	M.Phil. (Chem.); M.Sc. (Chem.)
Department of Mathematics	M.Phil. (Math.); M.Sc. (Math.)
Department of Physics	M.Phil. (Phy.); M.Sc. (Phy.)
Department of Humanities and Social Sciences	MA (Applied Linguistics and ELT); M Sc. (Economics); MBA

Doctor of Philosophy (Ph.D) Degree Program:

Department	Degrees Offered
Department of Civil Engineering	Ph.D. (CE)
Department of Electrical and Electronic Engineering	Ph.D. (EEE)
Department of Mechanical Engineering	Ph.D. (ME)
Department of Computer Science and Engineering	Ph.D. (CSE)
Department of Textile Engineering	Ph.D. (TE)
Department of Chemistry	Ph.D. (Chem.)
Department of Mathematics	Ph.D. (Math.)
Department of Physics	Ph.D. (Phy.)

Degrees Offered by Different Institutes:

Institute	Degrees Offered
Institute of Water and Environment (IWE)	Master of Science in Engineering (Water and Environment); Master of Engineering (Water and Environment); Postgraduate Diploma in Engineering (Water and Environment); Master of Science in Water and Environmental Management; Masters in Water and Environmental Management; Postgraduate Diploma in Water and Environmental Management
Institute of Information & Communication Technology (IICT)	Master of Science in Information & Communication Technology (M.Sc. Engg. in ICT); Master of Engineering in Information & Communication Technology (M.Engg. in ICT); Postgraduate Diploma in Information & Communication Technology (PG. Dip. in ICT); Postgraduate Diploma in Business Information Technology (PG. Dip. in Business IT)
Institute of Energy Engineering (IEE)	Master of Science in Energy Engineering (M.Sc. Engg. in EE); Master of Engineering in Energy Engineering (M.Engg. in EE); Postgraduate Diploma in Energy Engineering (PGD in EE)

== Institutes ==
There are three institutes, which are:

- Institute of Water and Environment Sciences (IWE)
- Institute of Information & Communication Technology (IICT)
- Institute of Energy Engineering (IEE)

=== Conferences and workshops ===
DUET regularly organizes conferences and workshops. Here are some examples of conferences and workshops that DUET might organize:

- International Conference on Sustainable Engineering Development (ICSED - 2023)
- International Conference on Next-Generation Computing, IoT and Machine Learning (NCIM - 2023)
- Workshop on Robotics and Automation
- International Conference on Mechanical, Manufacturing and Process Engineering (ICMMPE - 2022)
- International Conference on Advancement in Electrical and Electronic Engineering (ICAEEE 2024)
- 2nd International Conference on Mechanical, Manufacturing and Process Engineering (ICMMPE - 2024)
- 3rd International Conference on Advancement in Electrical and Electronic Engineering (ICAEEE 2024)
- 1st International Conference on Recent Innovation in Civil Engineering and Architecture for Sustainable Development (IICASD-2024)
- 1st International Conference on Science and Humanities for Sustainable Development (ICSHSD-2025)
- 2nd INTERNATIONAL CONFERENCE ON NEXT-GENERATION COMPUTING, IoT AND MACHINE LEARNING (NCIM-2025)
- 3rd International Conference on Mechanical, Manufacturing and Process Engineering (ICMMPE - 2026)

== Library ==
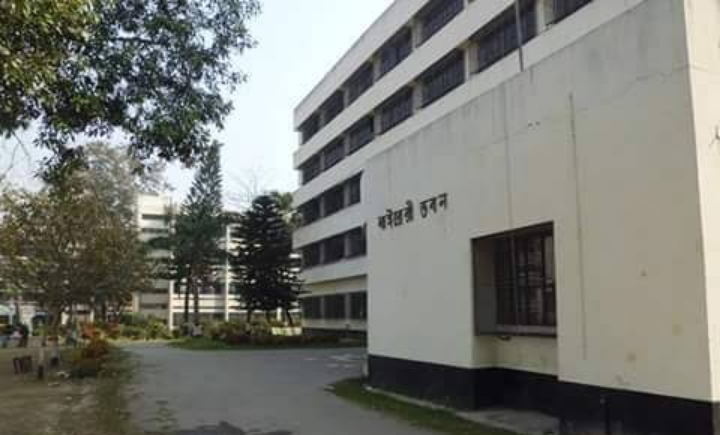
DUET Central Library

The general library has more than 37,000 books and 3,500 eBooks. Readers can also access over 3.7 million eJournals. The library keeps over 330 periodicals, more than 250 magazines, and thousands of thesis books.

DUET Institutional Repository and Integration with KOHA based DUET Digital Library.

== Medical Centre ==
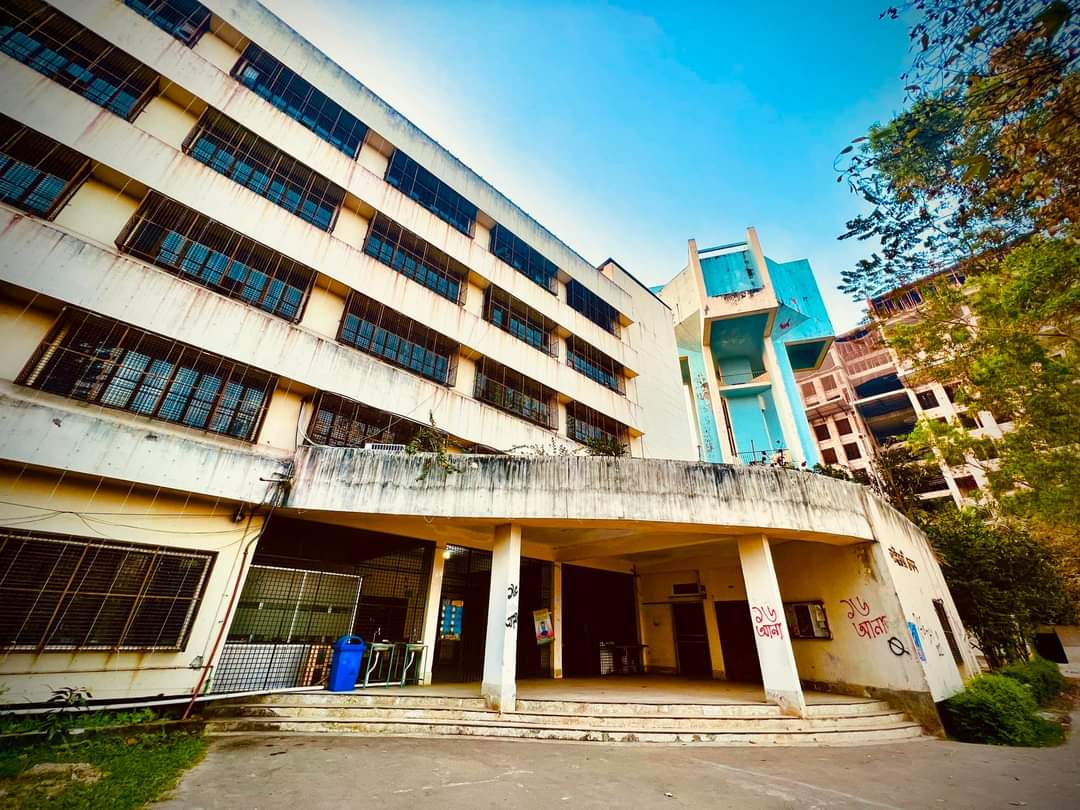
DUET Medical Centre

DUET medical center is located on the ground floor of the library building.

== Transportation ==
DUET runs a bus service for students, faculty, and staff, connecting the campus in Gazipur with different parts of Dhaka city.

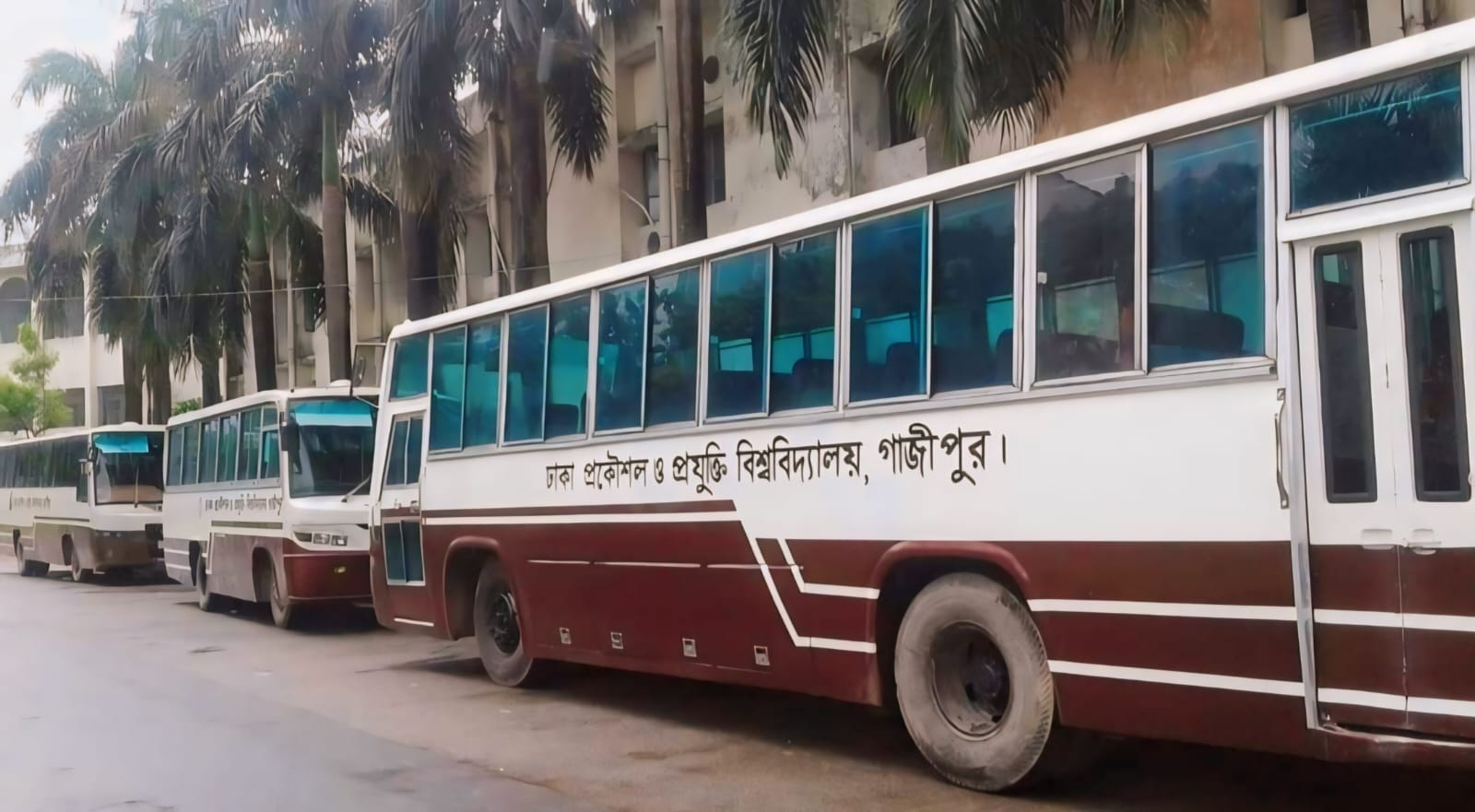

== Student Life ==
=== Halls of residence ===
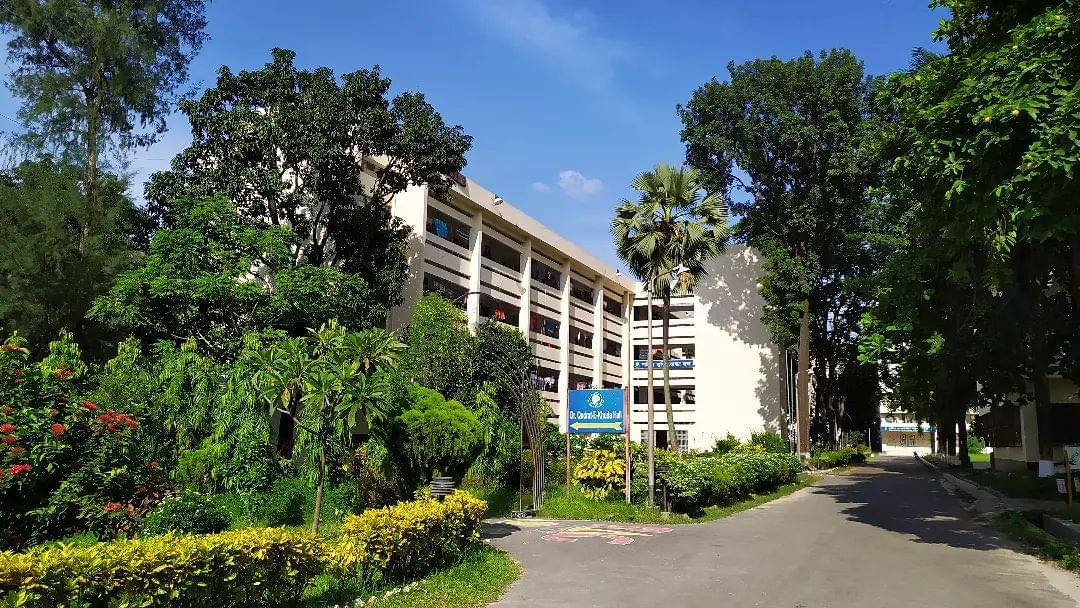
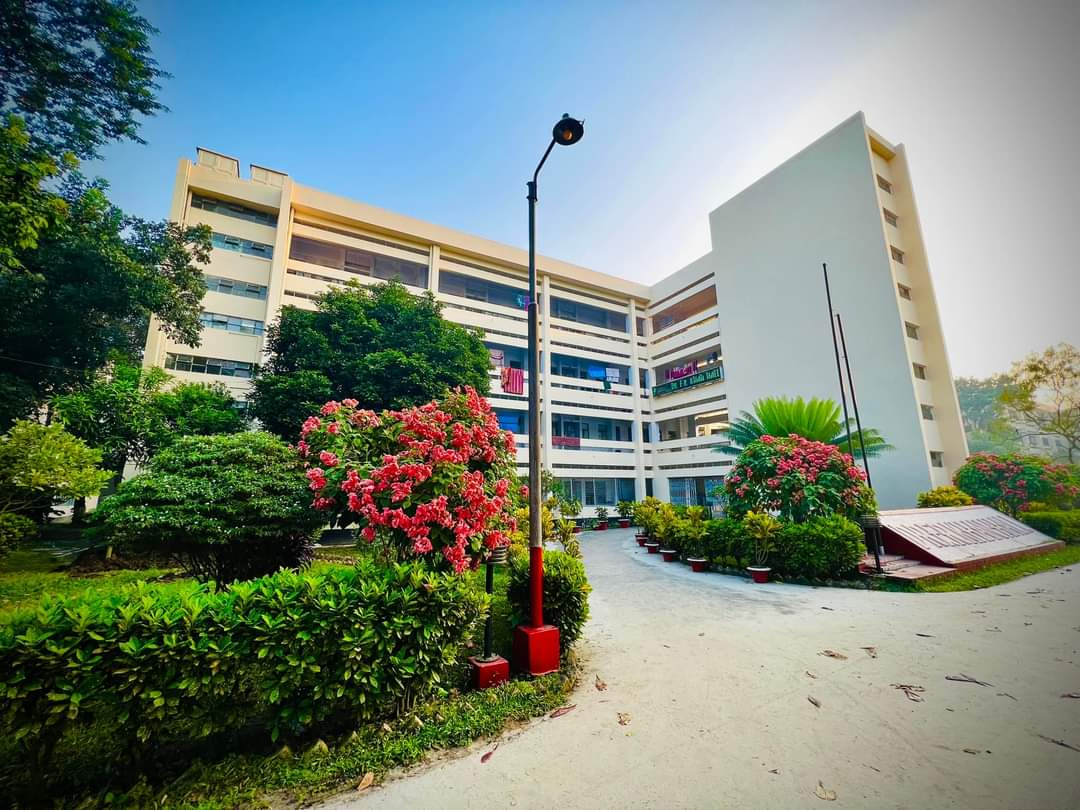
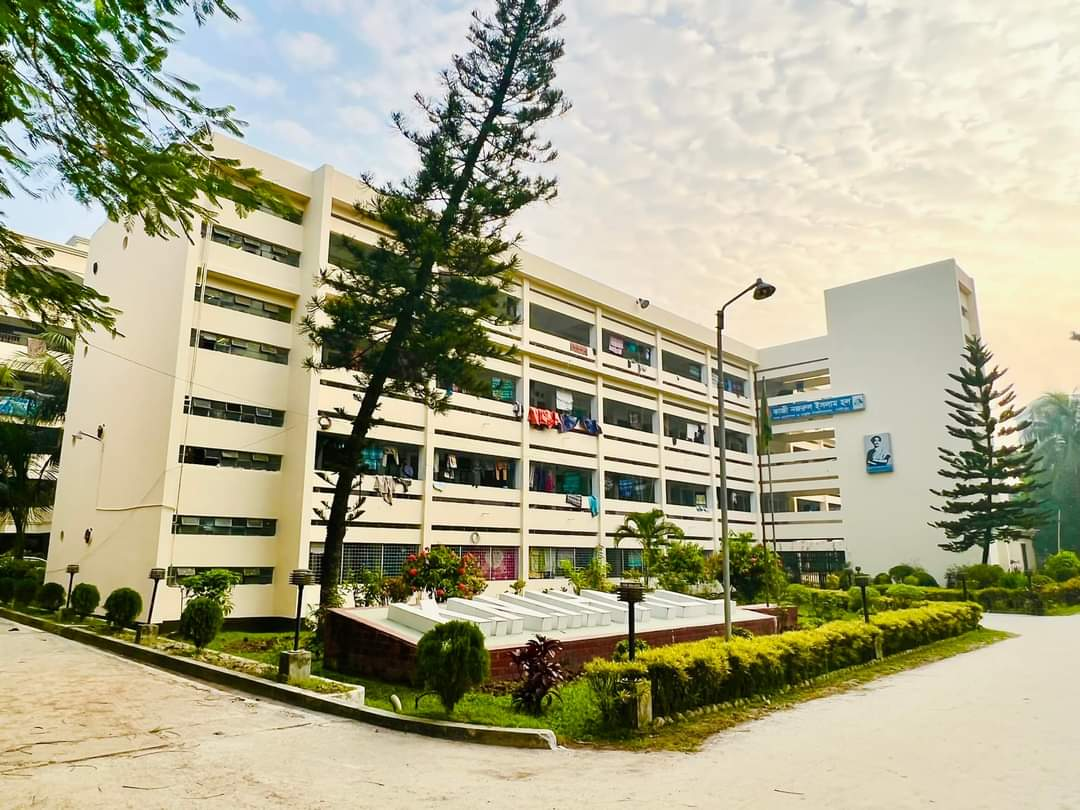
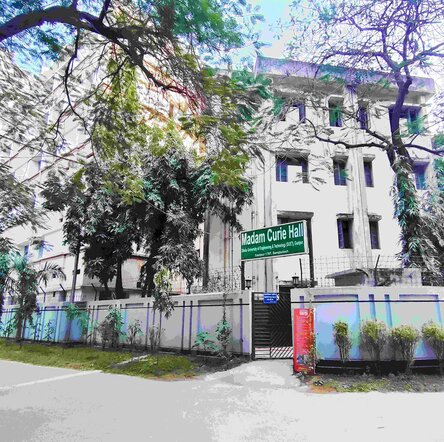
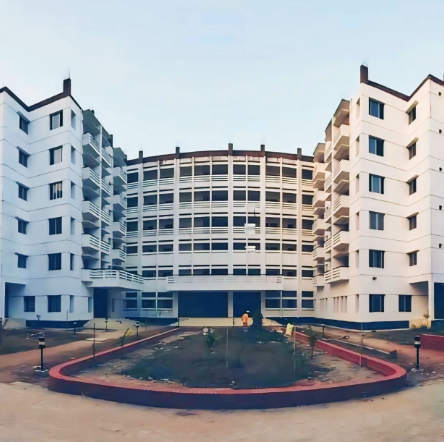
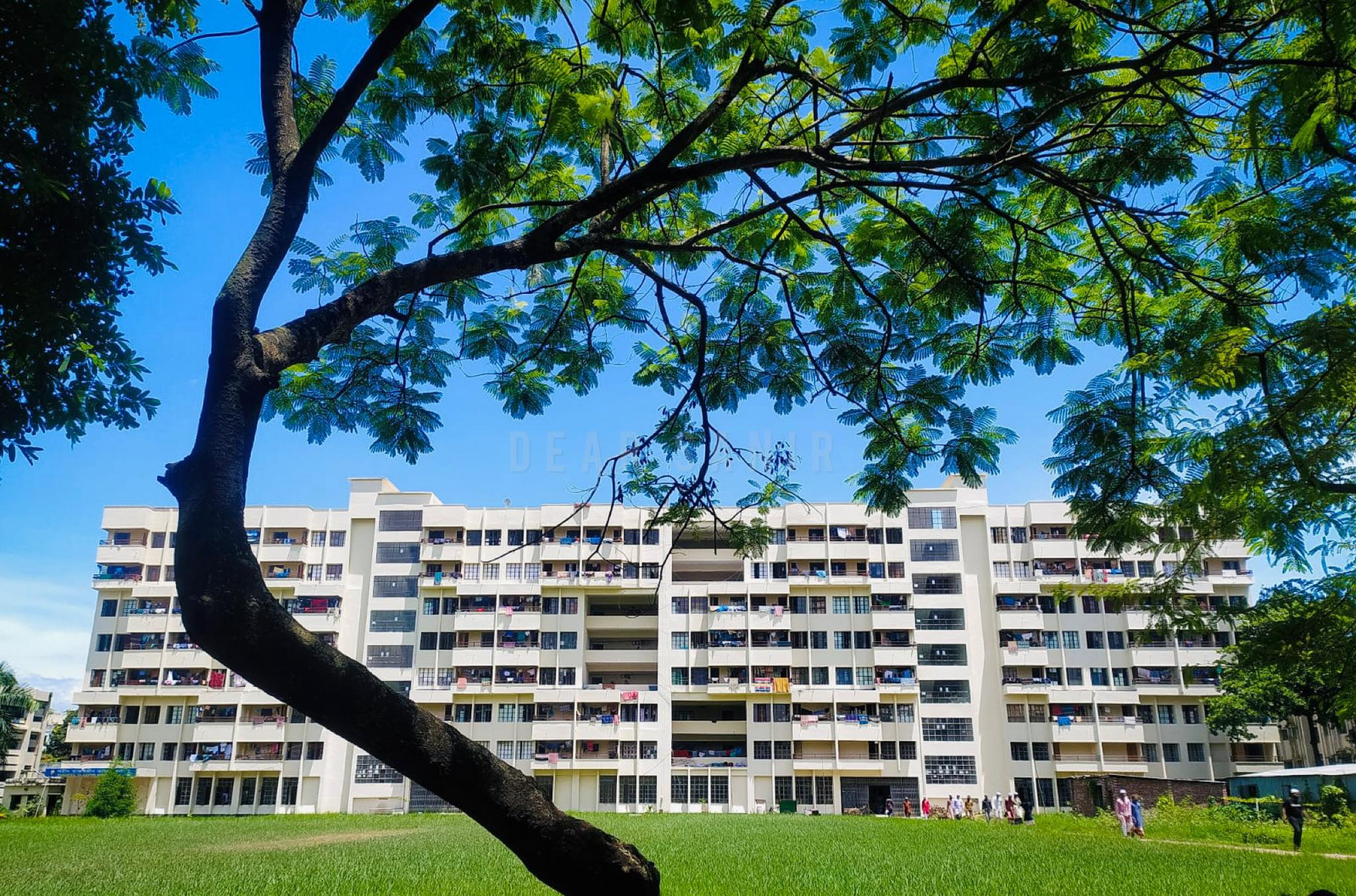
From top to bottom: QK Hall, DUET at the top, FR Khan Hall, DUETat the top middle-left, KNI Hall (old), DUET at the top middle-right, MC Hall, DUET at the bottom middle-left, Bijoy 24 Hall, DUET at the bottom middle-right, and finally STA Hall, DUET at the bottom.

There are seven male and two female dormitories at Dhaka University of Engineering & Technology (DUET). The halls are as follows:

- Fazlur Rahman Khan Hall
  Male hall named after the famous architect and engineer Fazlur Rahman Khan. Provides accommodation and study facilities for students.
- Muhammad Qudrat-E-Khuda Hall
  Male hall named after scientist Muhammad Qudrat-E-Khuda, offering residence and common student amenities.
- Shaheed Muktijoddha Hall
  Male hall honoring Bangladesh’s freedom fighters, with shared living and recreational spaces.
- Kazi Nazrul Islam Hall
  Male hall named after the national poet, providing modern residence facilities for students.
- Kazi Nazrul Islam Extension Hall
  Additional accommodation for Kazi Nazrul Islam Hall residents due to high demand.
- Marie Curie Hall
  Female hall named after scientist Marie Curie, with living spaces and common facilities.
- Marie Curie Extension Hall
  Extra accommodation for Marie Curie Hall residents.
- Shaheed Tajuddin Ahmad Hall
  Male hall named after Bangladesh’s first prime minister, offering residential and study facilities.
- Bijoy 24 Hall Hall
  Located on the DUET second campus, providing residence for students.

Hall Name	Present Provost	Capacity
Dr.Fazlur Rahman Khan Hall (FR Khan Hall)	Md. Anowar Hossain	130
Dr.Muhammad Qudrat-E-Khuda HALL (QK HALL)	Md. Arifur Rahman	140
Shaheed Muktijoddha Hall (SM Hall)	S. M. Mahfuz Alam	120
Kazi Nazrul Islam Hall (KNI Hall)	Md. Sahab Uddin	400 with Extension
Shaheed Tajuddin Ahmad Hall (STA Hall)	Utpal Kumar Das	650
Madam Curie Hall (MC Hall)	Ummey Rayhan	300 with Extension
Bijoy 24 Hall (B24 Hall)	Muhammad Abdur Rashid	350

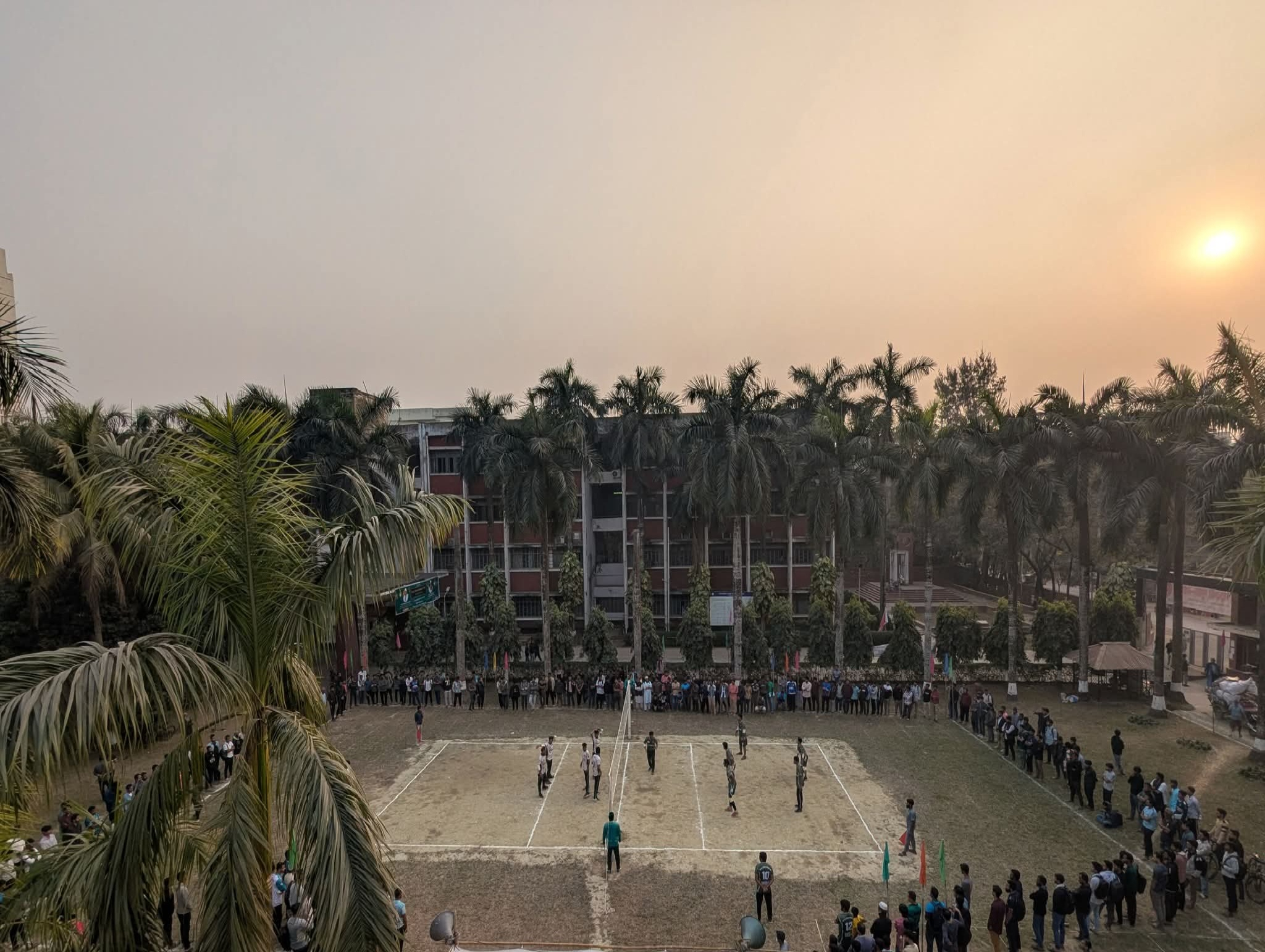
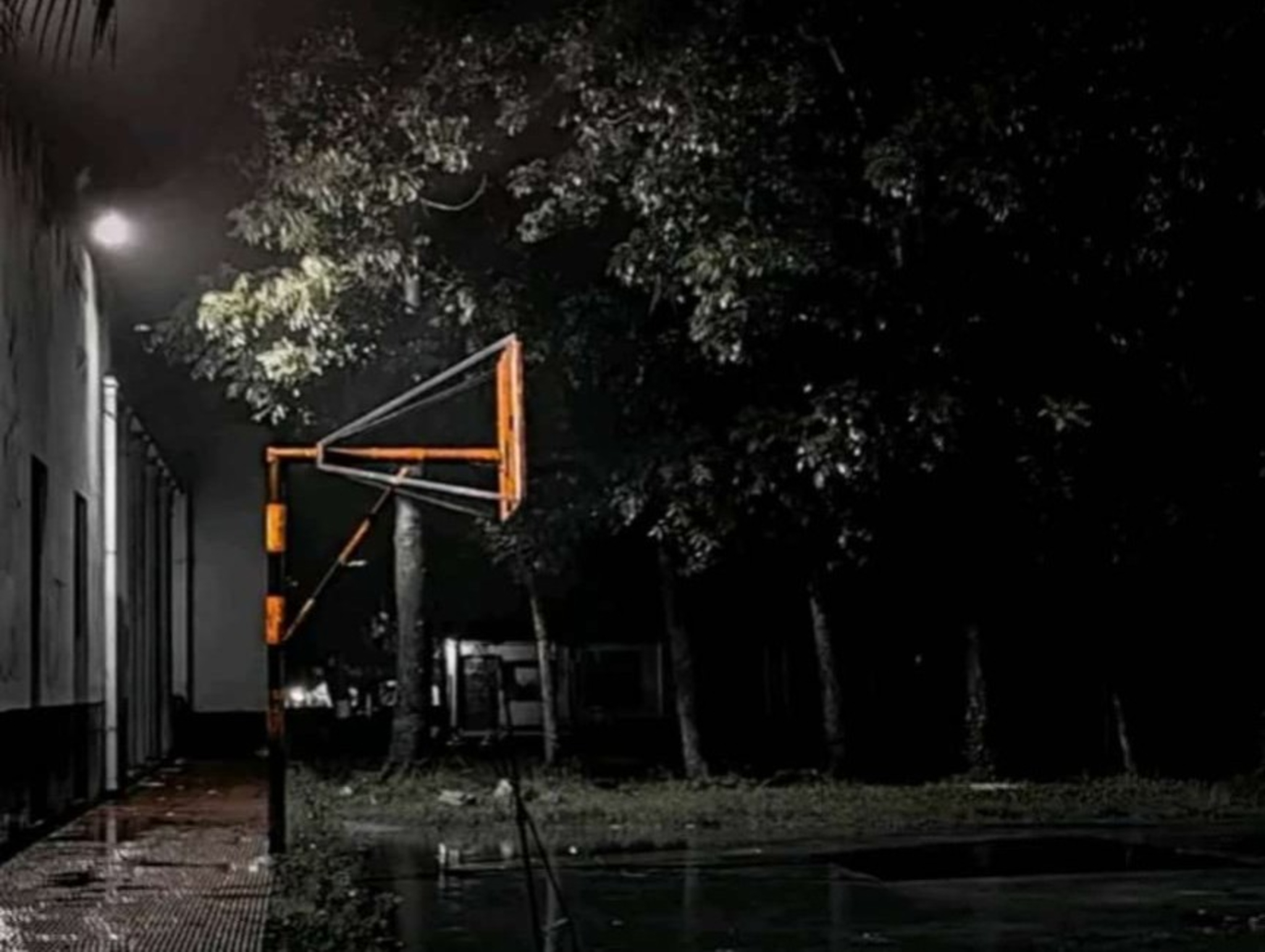
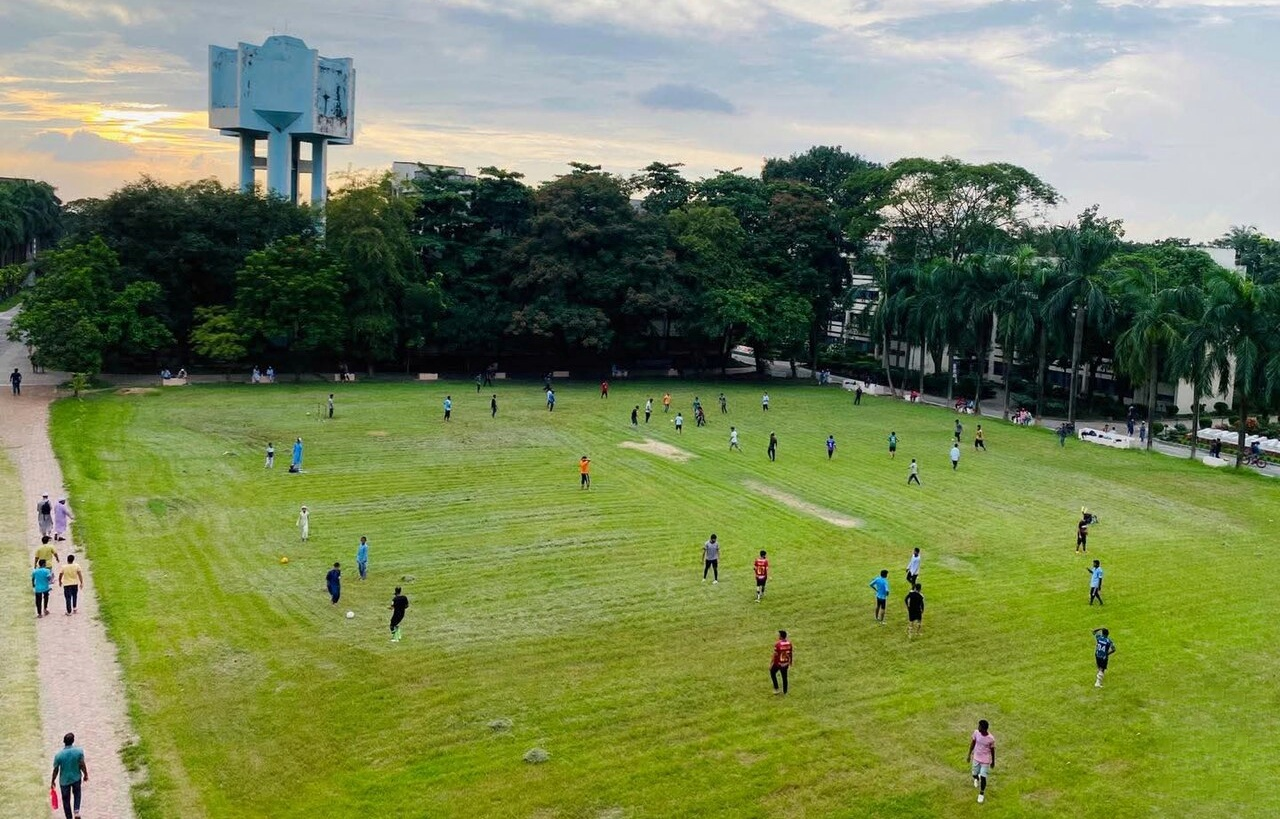
Volleyball Tournament at DUET on the top left, Basketball Court on the top right, and Playground of STA Hall below.

=== Sports facilities ===
DUET provides students with access to three main playgrounds, one of which is located at the second campus along with one smaller playground, a basketball court, and a volleyball court, ensuring space for various sporting activities. The sports facilities at DUET include amenities for football, cricket, volleyball, basketball, table tennis, carrom, and badminton. Additionally, DUET organizes yearly inter-department and inter-hall tournaments.

=== Students Complex ===
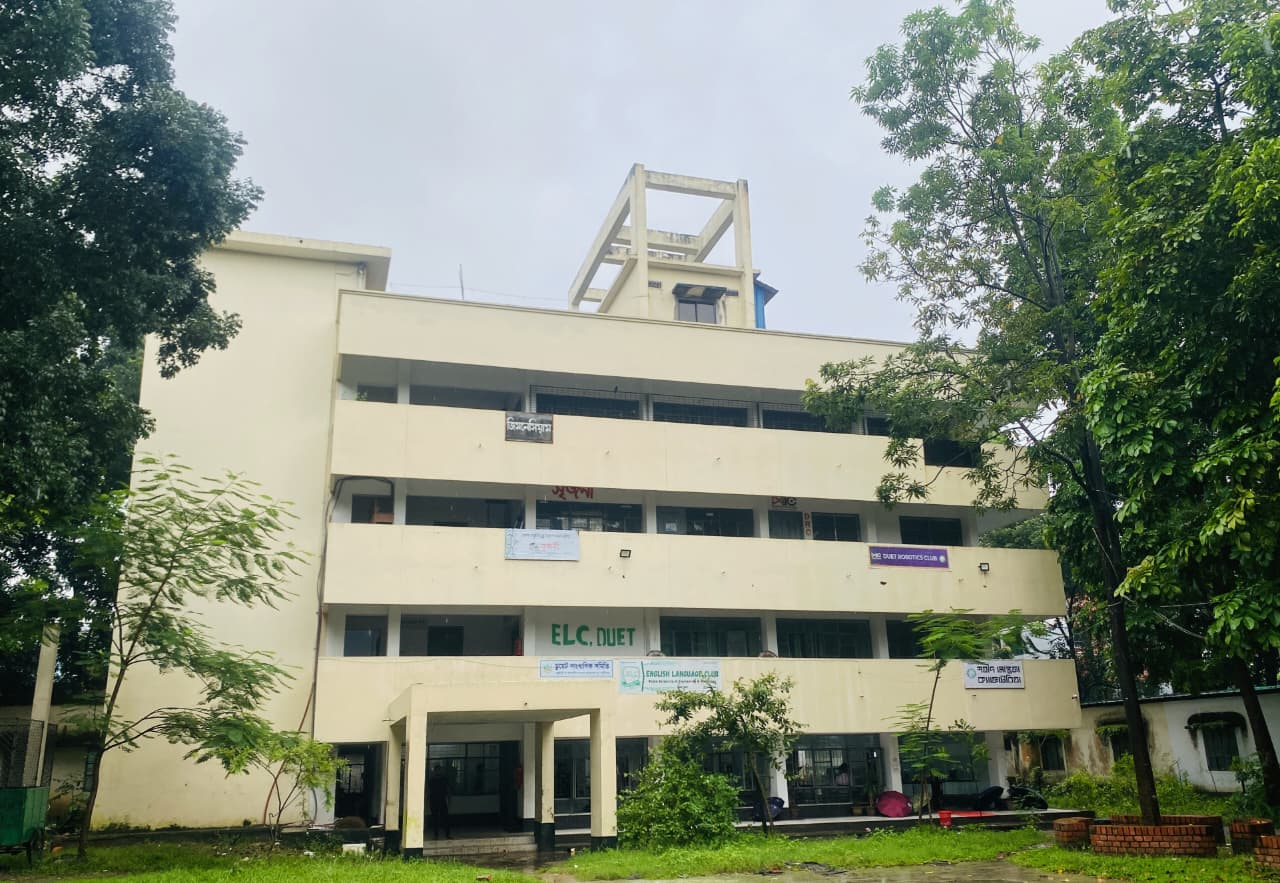
Students Complex Building

The DUET Student Complex is a building where students come together for various activities. It houses spaces for different clubs such as the English Language Club, Robotics Club, DUET Journal Association, and Srijonee. The complex also has the Shaheed Mostofa Cafeteria. There are meeting areas for students. It includes a gymnasium.

=== Computer Center ===
The Computer Center is responsible for developing and managing the university's computing and networking infrastructure, providing essential support for undergraduate and postgraduate teaching, learning, and research across all departments.

=== Convocations ===
- Second convocation: 2018
- First convocation: 2010
- First Convocation as BIT, Dhaka: 1994

=== Scholarship ===
The DUETian Scholarship helps students of DUET who do well in their studies. It gives financial support and encourages students to focus on learning and other activities.

== Student clubs and organizations ==
DUET hosts a variety of student clubs and organizations that cater to academic, cultural, research, and voluntary interests.

=== Political and unregistered organizations ===
Since September 2024, political organizations, regional organizations, and all types of unregistered student organizations have been banned at DUET.

=== Educational clubs ===
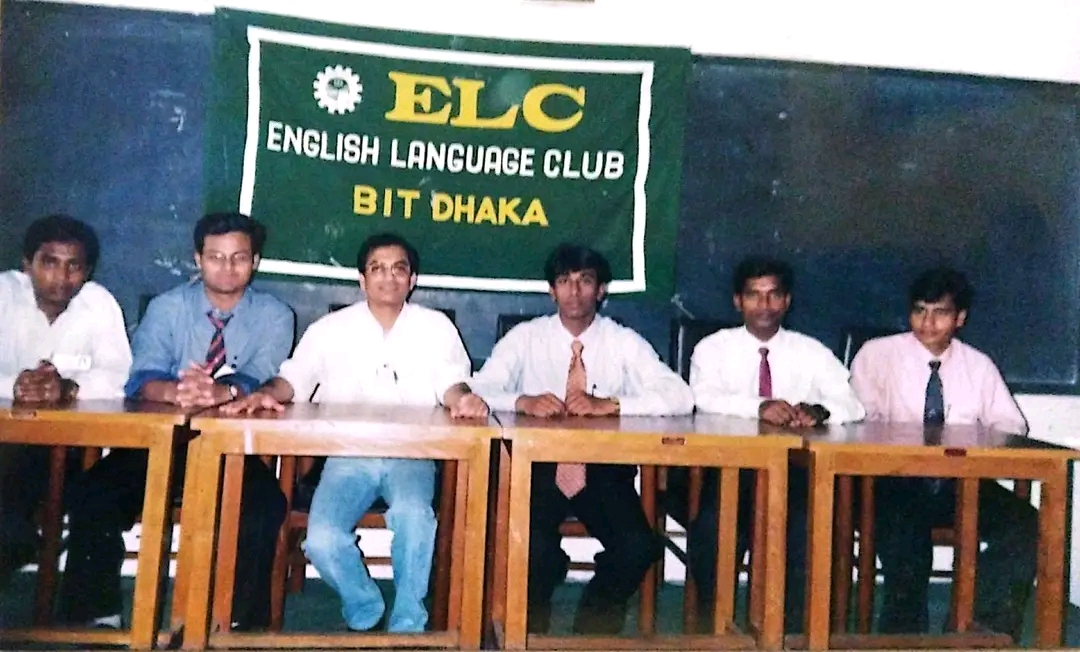
ELC event in 2000

- DUET Robotics Club (DRC): The Robotics Club allows students to explore robotics and technology through workshops, competitions, and team activities. Members gain experience in building and programming robots.
- English Language Club (ELC), DUET: ELC helps students practice English, build confidence, and develop communication skills. The club organizes events to support leadership and interpersonal growth.
- DUET Debating Society (DDS): DDS promotes critical thinking and public speaking through debates and discussion forums, helping members articulate ideas effectively.
- ASCE Student Chapter, DUET: ASCE organizes activities for civil engineering students to collaborate on projects and learn from experienced professionals.
- IEEE Student Chapter, DUET: This club offers students opportunities in electronics and engineering through seminars, workshops, and networking events.
- DUET Computer Society (DCS): DCS provides practical computer skills, industry exposure, and workshops to bridge classroom learning with real-world technology.
- DUET Automobile Society: Provides hands-on automobile engineering experience and fosters innovation, teamwork, and professionalism for DUET students from ME, EEE, MME, IPE, and ChE.
- DUET Energy Club: Focused on energy topics, including renewable energy, conservation, and sustainable practices. Members engage in research and discussions.
- DUET Nuclear Energy Club: Provides opportunities to learn about nuclear science and energy through lectures and interactive sessions.
- DUET Mathematics Club (DMC): Promotes interest in mathematics through problem-solving contests and collaborative activities.
- DUET Stapotta Shongha: A student organization of DUET’s Architecture Department, promoting creativity, community, and cultural activities among architecture students.
- ASHRAE DUET Student Branch: Supports DUET students in HVAC, refrigeration, and sustainable building systems through workshops, seminars, research, and professional networking.
- DUET Science Club (DSC): DUET Science Club is a student organization that promotes scientific learning, research, innovation, and knowledge sharing among students. It provides an open platform for students from all departments to engage in science-related activities, discussions, workshops, seminars, and collaborative initiatives, fostering scientific curiosity and interdisciplinary collaboration.

=== Sports club ===
- DUET Sports Club (DSC): DSC organizes sports tournaments, fitness programs, and recreational activities for students.

=== Research clubs ===
- DUET Career & Research Club: Supports students in exploring research opportunities and career development through workshops and guidance.
- DUET Innovation Society (DIS): Encourages creativity, innovation projects, and participation in competitions.
- DUET Textile Career & Research Club (DTCRC): Provides learning opportunities and career guidance for textile engineering students.
- IAAD Student Chapter, DUET: Supports Institute of Architecture and Design students through career-focused programs, competitions, alumni interactions, welfare activities, and merit awards. Membership is limited to IPE students.
- DUET MME Alliance: Supports MME students at DUET through research, career development, and co-curricular activities, fostering skills, leadership, and teamwork.
- EEE Students Association: Student group for EEE students at DUET promoting academics and professional development.
- DUET Society of Mechanical Engineers (DSME): A student organization for Mechanical Engineering students at DUET, supporting academics, skills development, and professional growth.

=== Cultural and media clubs ===
- Srijonee : Cultural & Social Organization: Organizes cultural events, music, art, and festivals, encouraging creative expression.
- DUET Drama Society: Engages students in theater and performance arts, welcoming all drama enthusiasts.
- DUET Photographic Society: Focuses on photography skills through workshops and exhibitions.
- DUET Literature Society: The DUET Literature Society, a sub-committee of Srijoni, promotes literary activities on campus through classic literature posts, weekly reading sessions, and open bookshelves. Its goal is to enrich DUET's reading culture.
- DUET Adventure Club: A student organization that promotes physical fitness, mental resilience, and exploration through structured tours, mountaineering expeditions, and outdoor skill-building activities for students interested in nature and travel.

=== Journalism Club ===
- DUET Journalist Association (DJA): Teaches journalism, writing, and reporting. Members cover campus news and develop media skills.

=== Voluntary clubs ===
- Swajan, DUET : DUET Voluntary Blood Donor Organization: Organizes blood donation events and promotes voluntary donation.
- DUET Blood Donation Society (DBDS): Conducts regular blood donation programs in support of hospitals and patients.
- DUET CR Forum: A student organization at DUET that represents class representatives, promoting student engagement, leadership, and coordination between students and faculty.

=== Religious organizations ===
- DUET Dawah Circle (DDC): Works to promote Islamic education and values among students by encouraging ethical living, social responsibility, and personal development based on Islamic principles, while maintaining respect for followers of all religions.
- Bani Archana Sangshad (DUET): Supports spiritual and moral learning for personal growth.
- Buddha Chatro Kalyan Parishad (BSWA): Established in 2004, it is the sole organization for Buddhist students at DUET, focusing on student welfare, religious and cultural activities, and social service.

== Administration ==
=== Top administrators ===
  - Chancellor: Holds a ceremonial role, presides over major events such as convocations.
  - Vice-Chancellor: Acts as the university's chief executive, responsible for overall administration and academic affairs.
  - Pro-vice-chancellor: Assist the vice-chancellor in specific areas such as academic planning, research, or student affairs.
1. Administrative Bodies:
  - Syndicate: Formulates policies, approves budgets, and ensures the smooth functioning of the university's operations.
  - Finance Committee: Manages financial resources, monitors expenditures, and ensures financial transparency and accountability.
  - CASR (Committee for Academic and Student Regulations): Develops academic policies, oversees regulations, and maintains academic standards.
  - Planning and Development Committee: Formulates strategic plans for the university's growth and development, including infrastructure projects and resource allocation.
  - Academic Council: Responsible for academic planning, curriculum design, program evaluation, and quality assurance.
  - Dean of Faculties: Oversee the academic affairs of their respective faculties, including curriculum implementation and faculty development.
  - Heads of Departments: Manage day-to-day operations within their departments, including academic programs, research initiatives, and faculty management.
  - Directors: Provide leadership for various academic and non-academic units, ensuring their effective functioning and alignment with the university's goals and objectives

Administrative Building

=== List of vice-chancellors ===
- 1st Vice Chancellor (2003 – 2004): Naseem Ahmed
- 2nd Vice Chancellor (2004 – 2008): M. Anwarul Azim
- 3rd Vice Chancellor (2008 – 2012): Mohammad Sabder Ali
- 4th Vice Chancellor (2012 – 2016): Mohammed Alauddin
- 5th Vice Chancellor (2016 – 2020): Mohammed Alauddin
- 6th Vice Chancellor (2020 – 11 August 2024): Md. Habibur Rahman
- 7th Vice Chancellor (21 October 2024 - 13 May 2026): Mohammad Zoynal Abedin
- 8th Vice Chancellor (Appointed on 14 May 2026): Mohammad Iqbal

=== List of pro-vice-chancellors ===
- 1st Pro Vice Chancellor (2021 – 14 August 2024): Abdur Rashid
- 2nd Pro Vice Chancellor (Appointed on 21 October 2024): Md. Arefin Kowser

=== Directors of Student's Welfare ===
- Utpal Kumar Das, Director
- Md. Rezaul Karim, Associate Director
- Md. Mahmudur Rahman, Associate Director
- Prolay Biswas, Deputy Director

== Second campus ==
Dhaka University of Engineering and Technology (DUET) 2nd campus is an ongoing development project aimed at accommodating the growing number of students at DUET. Situated on Majhir Khola Rd, Gazipur, near to the DUET main campus, this expansion initiative includes the construction of various facilities such as the ICT Incubator Building, an academic building, and a student hall.

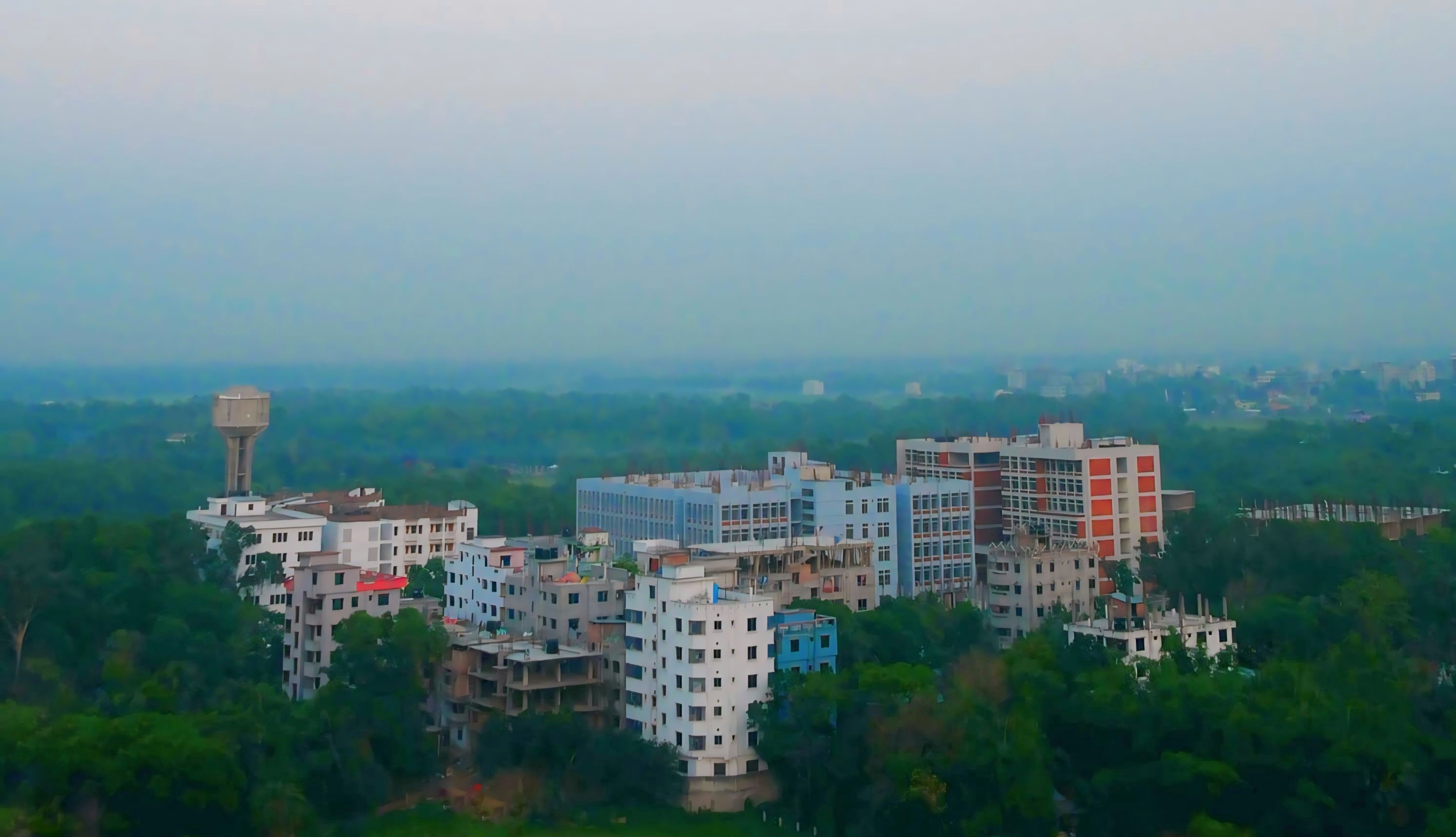
Aerial view of the second campus

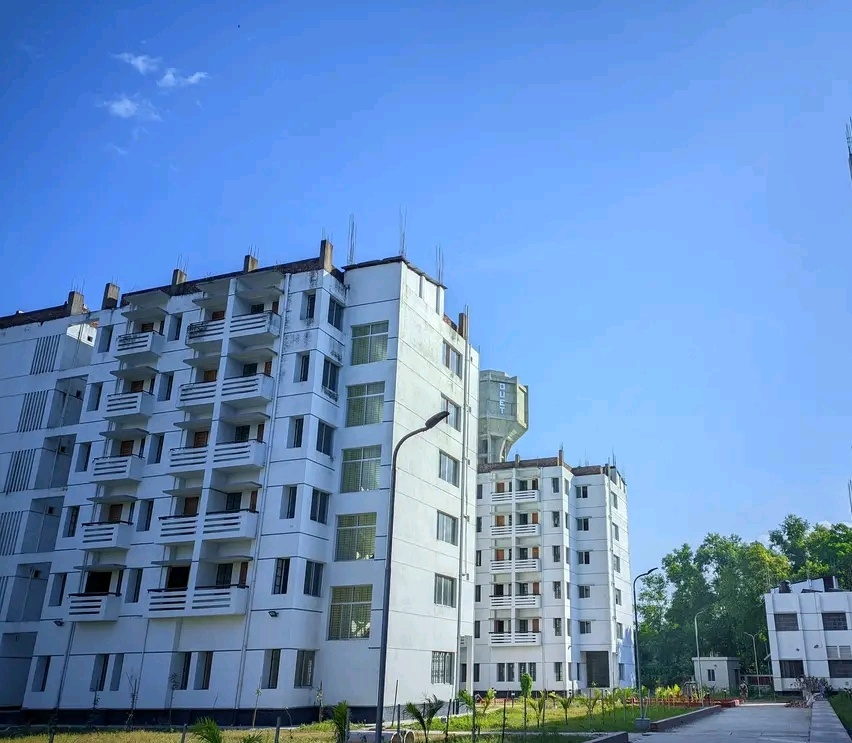
Bijoy 24 Hall, DUET

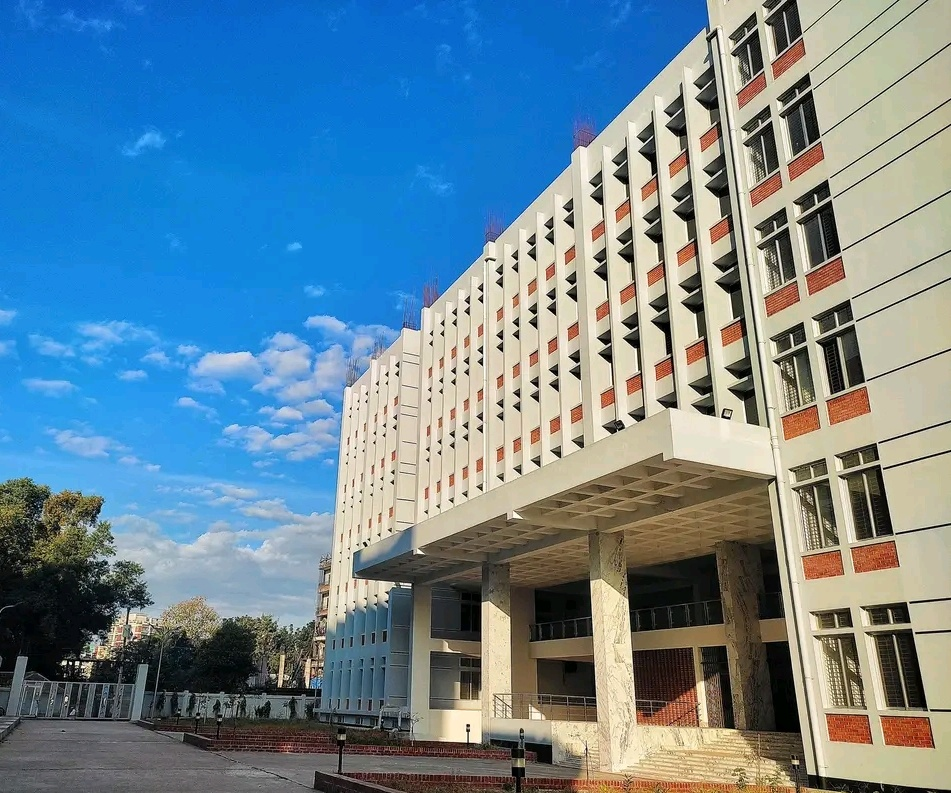
Academic Building, DUET

The need for this expansion arises from the increasing student population, necessitating additional infrastructure to support academic activities effectively. The development plan extends beyond the current construction phase, with a master plan in place to further enlarge the campus by 2041. Once completed, the DUET 2nd campus will provide enhanced facilities and resources to meet the educational needs of students, contributing to the overall academic excellence of DUET. DUET administration has started academic activities at the second campus in January 2025.

== Dhaka Engineering University School ==
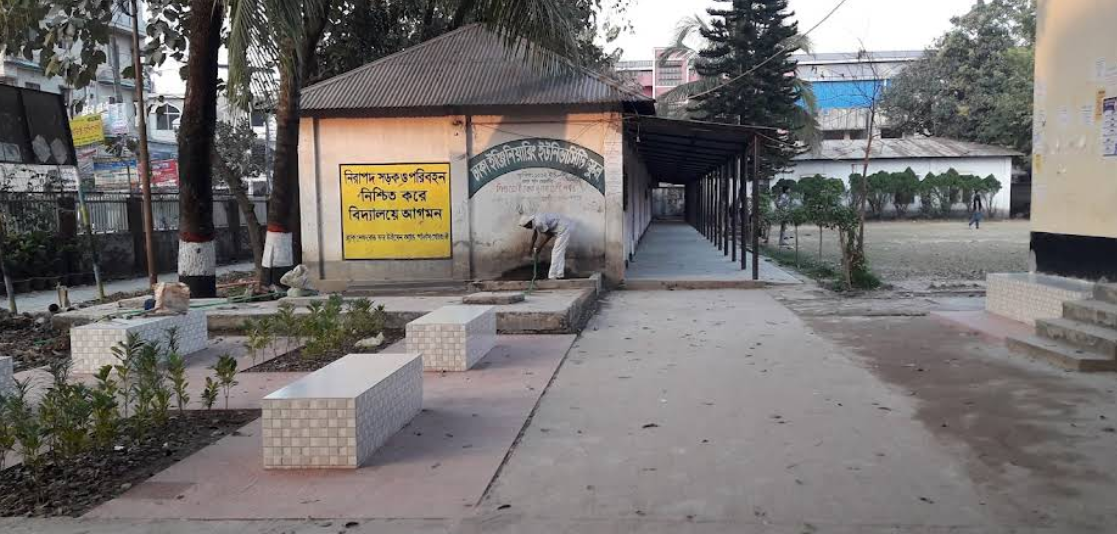
Campus view of Dhaka Engineering University School

Dhaka Engineering University School is a primary and secondary level educational institution adjacent to the campus of the Dhaka University of Engineering and Technology (DUET) in the Bhurulia area of Gazipur district, Bangladesh. It was established in 1994 when DUET was the Bangladesh Institute of Technology (BIT), Dhaka. The school operates in close association with the DUET academic environment and follows government-approved education board curricula. It places importance on discipline, moral education, and overall academic development.

The school mainly serves the children of DUET students and staff, offering a convenient learning environment within the university area. As an institution connected to DUET, it regularly takes part in co-curricular activities such as sports events and cultural programs, which support the physical, social, and mental growth of students.

== Criticism ==
- On 24 July 2025, the DUET authorities expelled 5 students from the hall on charges of homosexuality.
- The appointment of Professor Mohammad Iqbal as the Vice-Chancellor of Dhaka University of Engineering & Technology (DUET) in May 2026 sparked criticism and unrest on the campus. A section of students rejected the appointment and demanded that the vice-chancellor be selected from within DUET, arguing that external appointments do not reflect the university’s academic environment and internal experience. The situation escalated into protests, clashes, and campus blockades, disrupting normal academic activities. Reports indicated that several students and police personnel were injured during the clashes, while different groups exchanged allegations regarding responsibility for the violence. The protesters continued their movement for several days, declaring the newly appointed vice-chancellor "unacceptable" and calling for cancellation of the appointment and accountability for the clashes.

== See also ==
- List of universities in Bangladesh
- Islamic University of Technology
- Bangladesh University of Engineering & Technology
- Khulna University of Engineering & Technology
- Chittagong University of Engineering & Technology
- Rajshahi University of Engineering & Technology
- University of Dhaka
- Gazipur Agricultural University
