= Mohammad Zoynal Abedin =

Bangladeshi mechanical engineer and academic (born 1974)

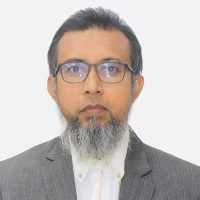

Vice-Chancellor of Dhaka University of Engineering & Technology, Gazipur
- In office 21 October 2024 – 13 May 2026
- Preceded by: Habibur Rahman
- Succeeded by: Dr. Mohammad Iqbal

Personal details
- Born: 1974 (age 51–52) Kutubdia Upazila, Cox's Bazar District, Bangladesh
- Education: Bangladesh University of Engineering and Technology; Nagoya Institute of Technology
- Occupation: Professor, university administrator

Mohammad Zoynal Abedin (born 1974) is a Bangladeshi mechanical engineer and academic. He is a professor in the Department of Mechanical Engineering at Dhaka University of Engineering & Technology, Gazipur (DUET) and formerly served as its vice-chancellor.

== Early life and education ==
Mohammad Zoynal Abedin was born in 1974 in Kutubdia Upazila, Cox's Bazar District. He earned his bachelor's and master's degrees in mechanical engineering from the Bangladesh University of Engineering and Technology (BUET) in 1998 and 2004, respectively. In 2010, he completed his Ph.D. in thermo-fluid mechanics at the Nagoya Institute of Technology, Japan. He also completed post-doctoral research at Yonsei University in South Korea in 2015 and Incheon National University in 2016.

== Career ==
Abedin began his teaching career in 1999 as a lecturer in the Department of Mechanical Engineering at DUET. He became an assistant professor in 2004, an associate professor in 2011, and a professor in 2013. He specializes in thermal engineering, fluid mechanics, energy systems, and refrigeration and air conditioning engineering. He has published over 50 research papers in both domestic and international journals. Besides teaching and research, he has held various administrative roles, including dean of the Faculty of Mechanical Engineering, head of the department, and director of Consultancy Research and Testing Service (CRTS). He has also served as a technical expert and consultant for numerous national and international projects. On 21 October 2024, he was appointed as the 7th vice-chancellor of DUET.

== Research interests and publications ==
Mohammad Zoynal Abedin is a prominent researcher in renewable energy, sustainable engineering, and energy efficiency, focusing on practical solutions to global energy challenges and reducing industrial carbon footprints. His research aims to advance sustainable practices that benefit both the environment and industrial productivity. Dr. Abedin has shared his findings through numerous research papers and presentations at national and international conferences, highlighting the global impact of his work.

== Awards and recognition ==
Throughout his career, Abedin has received recognition for his contributions to engineering and renewable energy. He has been honored by various academic and professional organizations for his work in advancing the field of mechanical engineering in Bangladesh.
