= S. M. Nazrul Islam =

Bangladeshi academic

11th Vice-Chancellor of Bangladesh University of Engineering and Technology
- In office 30 August 2010 – 13 September 2014
- Preceded by: A. M. M. Safiullah
- Succeeded by: Khaleda Ekram

Personal details
- Education: Ph.D. (mechanical engineering), East Pakistan University of Engineering and Technology; University of Windsor
- Occupation: university academic, professor

S. M. Nazrul Islam is a Bangladeshi academic. He served as the 11th Vice-chancellor of Bangladesh University of Engineering and Technology (BUET).

== Education ==
Islam earned his bachelor's from East Pakistan University of Engineering and Technology in 1969. He then joined in the Department of Mechanical Engineering as a Lecturer and later he completed his master's from BUET. He obtained his Ph.D. from University of Windsor.

== Career ==
Islam was the Dean of Engineering of University of Maiduguri in Nigeria and a Professor of Al Fateh University in Libya. He was the Head and Dean of Faculty of Mechanical Engineering at BUET. Besides, he served as the Director of Directorate of Students Welfare (DSW) and Centre for Energy Studies.

Islam was the President of Institute of Engineers Bangladesh (IEB). He served as the Vice-chancellor of Khulna University in late 1990s and Bangladesh University of Engineering and Technology from 2010 until 2014.

=== Controversy ===
Islam stirred controversy the day he took office on August 30, 2010 as the vice-chancellor of BUET. He assigned, Kamal Ahammad, a non-statutory deputy registrar, in charge of the registrar as an additional duty. In April 2012, BUET Teachers Association launched agitation bringing 16 allegations against Islam and Pro-vice-chancellor M Habibur Rahman. The association alleged that the appointment of Rahman to the post of Pro-VC was based solely on his political affiliations. On September 3, 2012, the students of BUET burnt effigies of Islam and Rahman on the campus demanding their resignation. On September 10, the post of Pro-VC held by Rahman was removed by the Chancellor and President of Bangladesh Zillur Rahman.
